= 1935 SMU vs. TCU football game =

American college football game

1935 SMU vs. TCU
- Conference game "Game of the Century"
| SMU Mustangs | TCU Horned Frogs |
| (10–0) | (10–0) |
| 20 | 14 |
| Head coach: Matty Bell | Head coach: Dutch Meyer |
| | 1 | 2 | 3 | 4 | Total |
|---|---|---|---|---|---|
| SMU | 7 | 7 | 0 | 6 | 20 |
| TCU | 0 | 7 | 0 | 7 | 14 |
- Date: November 30, 1935
- Season: 1935
- Stadium: Amon G. Carter Stadium
- Location: Fort Worth, Texas
- Halftime show: TCU Horned Frog Marching Band
- Attendance: Between 36,000 and 42,000

The 1935 SMU vs. TCU football game was a regular season college football game between the SMU Mustangs and the TCU Horned Frogs on November 30, 1935, at Amon G. Carter Stadium in Fort Worth, Texas. The two teams were undefeated and untied heading into the game. Both Southern Methodist University and Texas Christian University were members of the Southwest Conference, and a win in this game was necessary for either team to secure the conference championship. The game also held national championship implications, as the winner was expected to receive an invitation to compete in the Rose Bowl. As a result, the game is commonly considered the "Game of the Century", a moniker which noted sportswriter Grantland Rice, among others, used to describe the game. The buildup attracted a great deal of national attention, and it was the first football game in Texas to be broadcast nationwide on radio.

Both teams employed a strong passing game that was uncommon in the conference at the time. The game started with a 14–7 lead for the Mustangs going into halftime, and after a scoreless third quarter, the Horned Frogs, led by quarterback Sammy Baugh, scored a game-tying touchdown early in the fourth quarter. During a following drive by the Mustangs, quarterback Bob Finley performed a fake punt and connected with receiver Bob Wilson for another touchdown, with the Mustangs winning with a score of 20–14. Following the game, both teams finished the rest of their regular season undefeated and untied and were invited to two major bowl games, with the Mustangs playing the Stanford Indians in the Rose Bowl and the Horned Frogs playing the LSU Tigers in the Sugar Bowl. The Mustangs lost to Stanford, while TCU beat LSU, resulting in both teams finishing the season with identical 12–1 win-loss records. Both teams claim a mythical national championship for the season.

== Pre-game buildup ==
The football programs representing Southern Methodist University (the SMU Mustangs) and Texas Christian University (the TCU Horned Frogs) first played against each other in 1915. Prior to the 1935 game, they had played each other annually since 1921 (with the exception of the 1925 season), and both teams were members of the Southwest Conference (SWC). In the 1930s, both universities were considered to have above average football programs, and given their close geographic proximity to each other (SMU in Dallas was located only about 40 miles (64 km) from TCU in nearby Fort Worth), they shared a strong rivalry with each other. The all-time series at this point was tied, with both teams winning six games each, with an additional three ties.

Going into the 1935 season, both TCU and SMU employed a pass-heavy spread offense that was rare in the SWC at the time, and both were considered favorites to win the conference championship that year. By the time the two teams were scheduled to play against each other in Fort Worth on November 30, both teams were undefeated and highly ranked, and the winner of the game would secure the conference championship. Additionally, the winner of the game was expected to receive an invitation to compete in the Rose Bowl, which had national championship implications. Given the stakes in the game and the perceived quality of both teams (with some sportswriters considering the teams the two best in the nation), the game was considered a "Game of the Century" by many, including noted sportswriter Grantland Rice. TCU was slightly favored over SMU heading into the match, with sportswriters for both the Associated Press (AP) and the United Press (UP) giving the edge to TCU. Additionally, the AP sportswriters predicted that both teams would score at least two touchdowns.

=== SMU ===
SMU was led by first year head coach Matty Bell, who had served as an assistant coach the previous season before being promoted. Several years prior, Bell had actually served as the head coach at TCU. He had a reputation as a good defense coach and is credited with popularizing a strong passing game in the SWC. Bell coached a team that consisted of ten starters who were seniors and one junior. Notable players included Maurice Orr and Truman Spain as tackles, Billy Stamps and J. C. Wetsel as guards, Maco Stewart as an end, Harry Shuford as fullback, and Bob Wilson as a halfback. The previous season, Wilson had led the SWC in scoring, and at the end of the season he was named an All-American. Additionally, Bob Finley and J. R. Smith served as substitutes.

The Mustangs began their season with shutout wins against three nonconference teams: the North Texas State Teachers Eagles (39–0), the Austin Kangaroos (60–0), and the Tulsa Golden Hurricane (14–0). Over the course of the season, SMU would record a total of eight shutouts, including wins over teams that would finish the season with winning percentages of over 70, such as the Rice Owls, the Baylor Bears, and the UCLA Bruins. Their game against the Bruins on November 11 attracted a crowd of about 50,000 people at the Los Angeles Memorial Coliseum to watch the Mustangs' spread offense lead them to a 21–0 victory over the local team. Leading up to their match against TCU, SMU was undefeated and untied, with a record of 10–0. Additionally, no team had managed to score more than six points against the Mustangs, while they outscored their opponents 244 to 18, allowing only three touchdowns. As a result, they were ranked near the top among all college football teams in national rankings. (Note: Sources vary on exactly what rank SMU was going into their game against TCU. A 2010 article in The Daily Campus, SMU's student newspaper, stated that the Mustangs were ranked No. 1, while a 2007 book by historian Christopher J. Walsh puts the Mustangs as the No. 2 team in the country. However, several sources, including a 2017 article in The Dallas Morning News, a 2017 book written by historian Bill O'Neal, and a 2021 article on TCU 360 state that SMU was ranked No. 4 in the country. None of these sources state which college football ranking system they were citing.) However, prior to the game, both Shuford and Wetsel suffered injuries that rendered them unable to play.

=== TCU ===
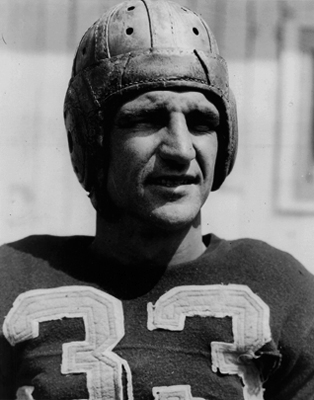
Sammy Baugh (pictured 1938) was the starting quarterback for the Horned Frogs.

TCU was led by head coach Dutch Meyer, who had taken on that position the previous season. Meyer is credited with introducing the spread offense to college football and brought with him to TCU an emphasis on a strong passing game, with his offense running plays that were arguably more complex than what many professional teams were running at the time. In particular, he pioneered the "Meyer spread", a double-wing formation style of offense consisting of four receivers. At quarterback, Meyer had Sammy Baugh, who also doubled as a safety on defense. Baugh, who was in his junior year at TCU, was the cornerstone of Meyer's offense, and his strategy was to utilize Baugh in a short passing game that allowed the Horned Frogs to maintain better control over the ball. Baugh at quarterback was well-regarded as a passer, with a sportswriter at the Fort Worth Star-Telegram commenting that Baugh "was the difference that lifted TCU out of the ordinary". Baugh was joined on offense by halfbacks Jimmy Lawrence and George Kline. Meanwhile, center Darrell Lester served as the team captain.

The Horned Frogs opened their season with a 41–0 shutout win against the Howard Payne Yellow Jackets, which was followed up the next week with a win over the North Texas State Teachers Eagles. After winning their first several games, the 6–0 Horned Frogs traveled to play the similarly 6–0 Baylor Bears, defeating that conference rival with 28–0 in what was their biggest game of the season at that point. The win was due primarily to Baugh's performance, as he completed ten of sixteen passes for three touchdowns. The next two games were also shutouts for TCU, as they traveled to beat the Loyola Wolf Pack and the Texas Longhorns with scores of 14–0 and 28–0, respectively. In their final game before taking on SMU, the Horned Frogs hosted the Rice Owls, beating them 27–6 before a crowd of 22,000. TCU at this point was undefeated and untied with a 10–0 record, having outscored their opponents 244 to 45 and allowing only five touchdowns. As a result, similar to SMU, they were ranked near the top among all college football teams in national rankings. (Note: Similar to SMU, there are some inconsistencies among sources regarding their rank immediately prior to their game against SMU. A 2007 book by historian Christopher J. Walsh, a 2017 book by historian Bill O'Neal, a 2017 article in The Dallas Morning News, and a 2021 article on TCU 360 all state that TCU was the No. 1 ranked team in the country at that time. However, a 2010 article in The Daily Campus states that they were the No. 2 team in the nation. None of these sources state which college football ranking system they were citing.)

== Game summary ==
Due to the high-profile nature of the game, it attracted many spectators, with estimates ranging between 36,000 and 42,000 in attendance, (Note: Sources vary considerably regarding the overall attendance for the game. On the low end, a 2021 article on TCU 360 stated that the game had 36,000 attendees, with Amon G. Carter Stadium only having a seating capacity of 30,000 at the time. In a 2017 book, historian Bill O'Neal gives a slightly different number for the seating capacity, stating that the stadium had a regular capacity of 24,000 and that temporary bleachers were brought in to add 3,500 extra seats. O'Neal also cites contemporary sportswriter Grantland Rice as estimating that about 37,000 people were in attendance. Contemporary reporting from the United Press gave the stadium an estimated capacity of about 32,000 and stated that an estimated 18,000 were expected to be turned away at the gates. A 2010 article on ESPN.com stated that the stadium had a seating capacity of about 25,000, but held 37,000 for the game, with many spectators sitting behind endzones or in nontraditional seating arrangements. The 1936 SMU yearbook stated that there were over 37,000 attendees. A 2010 book by historians Fred Eisenhammer and Eric B. Sondheimer stated that over 40,000 people were in attendance, while a 2004 article by The Daily Campus stated that 42,000 people attended, despite a seating capacity of about 30,000.) making it the second-largest attendance for a football game in Texas up to that time. The game also attracted sportswriters from around the country, including Bill Cunningham, Paul Gallico, Grantland Rice, and Arch Ward. Also in attendance was a young Dan Jenkins, who would later go on to be a sportswriter for Sports Illustrated. It was the first game in the region to receive national attention. It was filmed by NBC, who also gave a national radio broadcast of the game, making it the first game in both Texas and the SWC to be broadcast nationwide. The halftime show was performed by the TCU Horned Frog Marching Band. As part of their performance, the band played "Taps" as a tribute to Will Rogers, a famous actor who had died earlier that year. During the performance, $1,400 was collected in donations from the audience to help fund the creation of the Will Rogers Memorial Center in Fort Worth.

=== First quarter ===
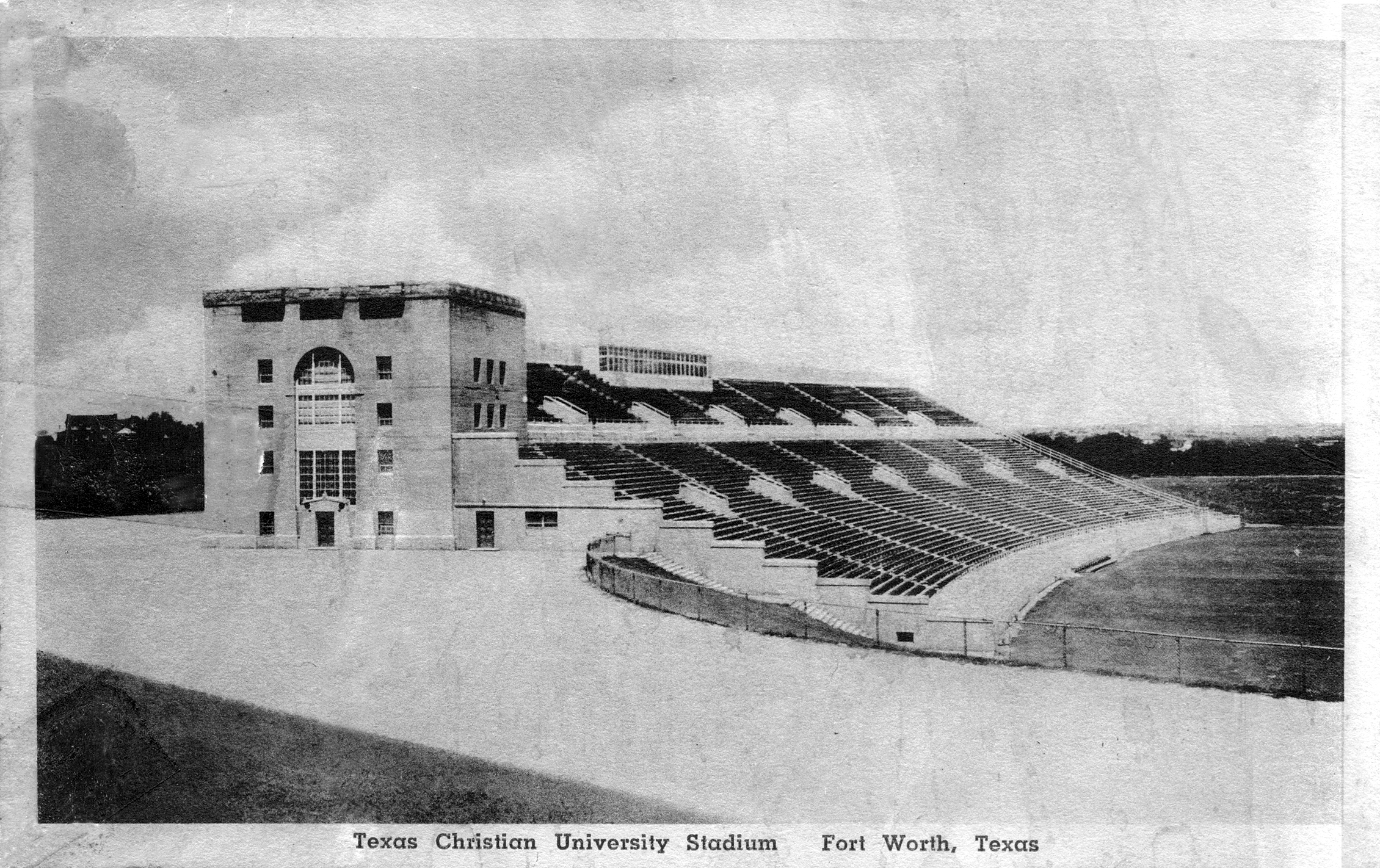
Amon G. Carter Stadium, c. early 20th century

The game began with a kickoff by SMU's Maurice Orr that was caught by Jimmy Lawrence at TCU's 4-yard line. After SMU gained possession of the ball, the first touchdown drive of the game began that saw the Mustangs move the ball 73 yards down the field. Finally, at TCU's 1-yard line, Bob Finley was able rush for a touchdown, which was followed by a successful extra point attempt by Maurice Orr, putting the Mustangs in the lead with a score of 7–0. This drive had taken SMU about 22 plays to make.

=== Second quarter ===
Early in the second quarter, SMU began an 80-yard drive down the field, during which Finley was able to complete a 33-yard pass to Maco Stewart. Eventually, the Mustangs found themselves at the TCU 9-yard line, allowing Bobby Wilson to run for a touchdown. Another extra point attempt by Orr was successful, giving SMU a 14–0 lead. However, TCU responded with a 74-yard drive, led by Sammy Baugh, that resulted in a touchdown and successful extra point attempt, bringing the score to 14–7 going into halftime.

=== Third quarter ===
In the third quarter, TCU had a drive with Baugh passing and Lawrence and George Kline rushing. However, nothing came of this drive, and the third quarter would see neither team score.

=== Fourth quarter ===
Early in the fourth quarter, Baugh completed an 8-yard pass to Lawrence that resulted in a touchdown and, with an extra point, tied the score at 14–14. However, Lawrence was injured on the play, leaving him benched for the remainder of the game. Smith received the ball after a TCU kickoff and returned it thirty yards up the field, with the Mustangs' next drive starting at the TCU 47-yard line. Eventually, the Mustangs were able to make it to between the TCU 35- and 40-yard line. (Note: Sources vary on where the Mustangs were on the field at this time. The 1936 SMU yearbook states that they were on TCU's 37-yard line, which is also given in a 2021 article on TCU 360. A 2010 book by historians Fred Eisenhammer and Eric B. Sondheimer places the Mustangs on the 36-yard line, while a 2010 article on ESPN.com states that the Mustangs were on the 39-yard line.) Around this time, Coach Bell ordered Smith to be the Mustangs' play caller, though Finley remained at quarterback. With about nine minutes left in the game, the Mustangs were on fourth down with several more yards to go. (Note: While a 2010 article on ESPN.com states that the Mustangs had 4 yards to go for another first down, a 2010 book by historians Fred Eisenhammer and Eric B. Sondheimer states that the Mustangs had 7 yards to go.) Smith called for a fake punt, with Finley to instead throw to Wilson. The trick play was successful, with Finley connecting with Wilson near the end zone before he stumbled in, giving the Mustangs another touchdown. (Note: While a 2010 article on ESPN.com states that the pass had been a 45-yard pass, a 2010 book by historians Fred Eisenhammer and Eric B. Sondheimer states that the pass had been for 35 yards.) With a missed extra point kick by Orr, the new score was 20–14.

Following the play, TCU made two drives that landed the Horned Frogs within SMU territory. The final drive of the game came after Wilson fumbled the ball near the TCU 26-yard line, allowing the Horned Frogs to take possession. On this final drive, Baugh completed three consecutive passes, including a 17-yard pass to L. D. Meyer, an end, that put TCU on SMU's 35-yard line with little time remaining. On the final play of the game, Baugh threw to a receiver who was near the goal line, but a Mustang knocked the ball down for an incomplete pass as the game clock expired, with SMU winning 20–14.

Immediately following the win, with an expected bid to the Rose Bowl coming, the Southern Methodist University Mustang Band played a rendition of "California, Here I Come".

== Statistical summary ==
Baugh finished the game with 16 completions out of 41 attempted passes for a total of 184 yards. This included nine completions in the fourth quarter alone that accounted for 116 yards. On the other side, Wilson finished with 14 carries for a total of 97 yards. In total, TCU finished with 362 total yards of offense and 25 first downs, while SMU finished with 315 total yards of offense and 17 first downs.

== Aftermath ==
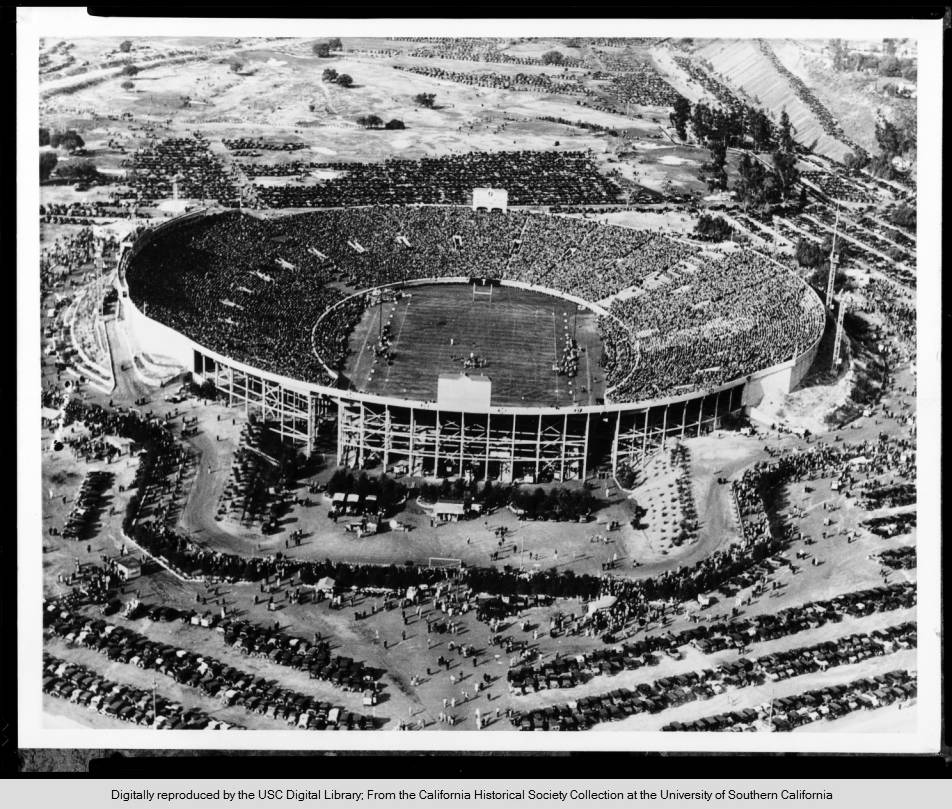
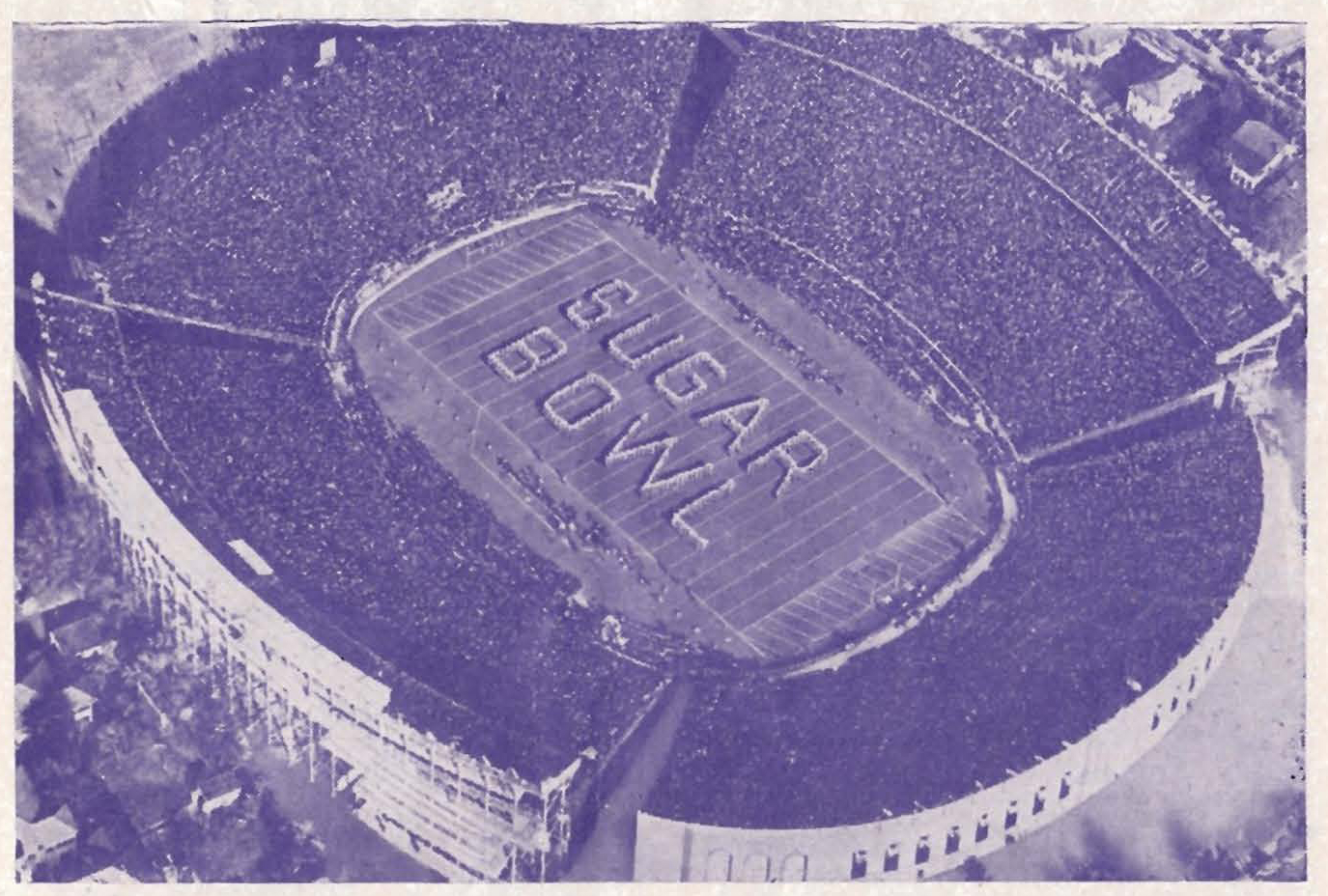
Following the regular season, SMU played in the Rose Bowl (left, pictured 1926), while TCU played in the Sugar Bowl (pictured 1948).

The game was considered an instant classic. Rice called the game "one of the greatest football games ever played", and several polls include it as among the top 10 greatest college football games of all time. In 2017, The Dallas Morning News ranked the game No.1 out of all games played between SMU and TCU (At the time of publication, the two teams had met on the gridiron a total of 96 times). The game and the attention it brought also helped to elevate the status of the SWC compared to other conferences, such as the Big Ten Conference and the Southeastern Conference.

=== SMU ===
With the win, SMU secured the conference championship. SMU received and accepted a bid to the Rose Bowl, making them the first SWC team and the first team from Texas to play in the bowl game. Additionally, they would be the first team from west of the Mississippi River to represent the eastern United States in the game. At the time, SMU still owed money over the recent construction of their football stadium, Ownby Stadium, and the university used the $85,000 payout from the game to pay off its debts. As a result, Finley's game-winning touchdown in the fourth quarter was sometimes referred to as the "$85,000 pass". The invitation came prior to SMU's final game of the season against the Texas A&M Aggies, who the Mustangs defeated for an undefeated and untied regular season record. They were only one of three major college football teams to go undefeated that season, alongside the Minnesota Golden Gophers and the Princeton Tigers.

Four charter trains ran from Dallas to Pasadena, California, transporting about 4,000 students and fans to the game, which was a sell-out. However, the Mustangs would go on to lose 7–0 to the Stanford Indians, giving them a final win-loss record of 12–1. Despite the bowl game loss, SMU still claimed a mythical national championship for the season. The Dickinson System, which named a national championship before bowl games had taken place, named SMU as the 1935 national champions, giving the team the Rockne Trophy. This marked the first time that a team from Texas had been named the national champions. Wilson finished first in the conference in scoring that season and was named an All-American, making him the first back from the SWC to have that honor. He would later go on to have a successful career in the National Football League (NFL).

=== TCU ===
Following the game, TCU had one remaining game on their regular schedule against the Santa Clara Broncos, who they beat 10–6. Finishing the regular season with only one loss, they were invited to the Sugar Bowl, where they would play the LSU Tigers. The Horned Frogs won that game 3–2, giving them a 12–1 win-loss record for the overall season, the same as the Mustangs. Following the bowl game, the Williamson System, a ranking system that was the only one that ranked a team after bowl games had been played, named the TCU Horned Frogs as national championships, an honor they shared with the LSU Tigers. As a result, both SMU and TCU claim a national championship for the 1935 season.

Due in part to his performance in the game, Baugh became a nationally recognized quarterback. In both 1935 and 1936, Baugh led the nation in passing, and he was named an All-American in both seasons. In the first round of the 1937 NFL draft, he was selected by the Boston Redskins (later Washington Redskins), with whom he would have a long career and would become the first football player to be part of both a collegiate and professional national championship team.

== Sources ==
- Campbell, Dave (2019). Dave Campbell's Favorite Texas College Football Stories (First ed.). College Station, Texas: Texas A&M University Press. ISBN 978-1-62349-725-5.
- Eisenhammer, Fred; Sondheimer, Eric B. (2010). "SMU's Wilson Bests TCU's Baugh". College Football's Most Memorable Games (Second ed.). Jefferson, North Carolina: McFarland & Company. pp. 28–32. ISBN 978-0-7864-6185-1.
- Herskowitz, Mickey (2006). The 1939 Texas Aggies: The Greatest Generation's Greatest Team (First ed.). Houston: Halcyon Press Ltd. ISBN 978-1-931823-39-5.
- Holley, Joe (2012). Slingin' Sam: The Life and Times of the Greatest Quarterback Ever to Play the Game. Foreword by Peyton Manning (First ed.). Austin, Texas: University of Texas Press. ISBN 978-0-292-74569-8.
- Marmorstein, Gary (2013). A Ship Without A Sail: The Life of Lorenz Hart (First Simon & Schuster paperback ed.). New York City: Simon & Schuster. ISBN 978-1-4165-9426-0.
- Martin, Charles H. (2010). Benching Jim Crow: The Rise and Fall of the Color Line in Southern College Sports, 1890–1980. Champaign, Illinois: University of Illinois Press. ISBN 978-0-252-07750-0.
- O'Neal, Bill (2017). ""The Game of the Century," November 30, 1935". In Scheer, Mary L. (ed.). Eavesdropping on Texas History. Denton, Texas: University of North Texas Press. pp. 174–192. ISBN 978-1-57441-675-6.
- Oriard, Michael (2001). King Football: Sport and Spectacle in the Golden Age of Radio and Newsreels, Movies and Magazines, the Weekly and the Daily Press. Chapel Hill, North Carolina: University of North Carolina Press. ISBN 978-0-8078-6403-6.
- Ryczek, William J. (2009). Crash of the Titans: The Early Years of the New York Jets and the AFL. Foreword by Don Maynard (Revised ed.). Jefferson, North Carolina: McFarland & Company. ISBN 978-0-7864-5410-5.
- Walsh, Christopher J. (2007). Who's #1?: 100-Plus Years of Controversial National Champions in College Football (First Taylor Trade Publishing ed.). Lanham, Maryland: Taylor Trade Publishing. ISBN 978-1-4617-3476-5.
