= SMU Mustangs =

Collegiate sports club in the United States

- University: Southern Methodist University
- Nickname: Mustangs
- NCAA: Division I (FBS)
- Conference: Atlantic Coast Conference
- Athletic director: Damon Evans
- Location: University Park, Texas
- Varsity teams: 17
- Football stadium: Gerald J. Ford Stadium
- Basketball arena: Moody Coliseum
- Soccer stadium: Westcott Field
- Colors: Red and blue
- Mascot: Peruna
- Fight song: Pony Battle Cry
- Website: smumustangs.com
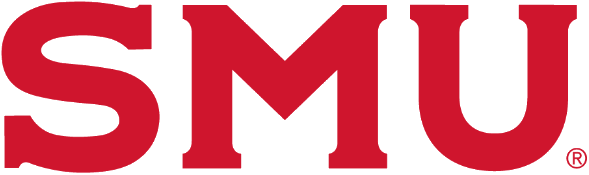

Atlantic Coast Conference logo in SMU's colors

The SMU Mustangs are the athletic teams that represent Southern Methodist University in University Park, Texas, United States. (Note: Virtually all of the SMU campus lies within University Park, which together with its neighbor Highland Park forms an enclave within the city limits of Dallas. The United States Postal Service considers all locations within University Park and Highland Park to have a Dallas address.) SMU was founded in 1911 and joined the Southwest Conference, competing against Baylor, Rice, Texas, Texas A&M, Arkansas and Oklahoma A&M (which later became Oklahoma State). They have been a member of the Atlantic Coast Conference (ACC) since 2024.

The football team has participated in various bowl games, from the Dixie Classic in 1924 to the Fenway Bowl in 2023. Football alumni include Heisman winner Doak Walker, All-American Eric Dickerson, and two-time Super Bowl winner Forrest Gregg.

== Conference affiliations ==
=== Timeline history ===
The Mustangs currently participate in the NCAA Division I (FBS for football) as a member of the ACC. From 1918 to 1996, the Mustangs were a member of the Southwest Conference, until it formally disbanded. The Mustangs subsequently joined the Western Athletic Conference and in 2005, SMU accepted an invitation to the Western Division of Conference USA. They accepted an invitation to join the Big East Conference, which split along football lines in 2013, with SMU and the other FBS schools reorganizing as the American Athletic Conference (now known as the American Conference). SMU was the only private school in the conference when it began operation as the American in 2013, but it was joined by Tulane and Tulsa a year later. The Mustangs left the conference on June 30, 2024, to join the Atlantic Coast Conference.

=== NCAA timeline ===
- Southwest Conference (1918–1996)
- Western Athletic Conference (1996–2005)
- Conference USA (2005–2013)
- American Athletic Conference (2013–2024)
- Atlantic Coast Conference (2024–present)

== Varsity sports ==
Men's sports	Women's sports
Basketball	Basketball
Football	Cross country
Golf	Equestrian
Lacrosse (2027–28)	Golf
Soccer	Rowing
Swimming & diving	Soccer
Tennis	Swimming & diving
	Tennis
	Track and field^{†}
	Volleyball
† – includes both indoor and outdoor.

=== Football ===
==== National titles ====
In 1935, SMU had a 12–1–0 record, scoring 288 points while giving up 39. The Mustangs shut out eight of their 12 regular season opponents, including conference rivals Texas, Rice, Baylor, and Texas A&M. The 1935 Mustangs were crowned national champions by Frank Dickinson, one of seven contemporaneous selectors, all math systems, that chose five different national champions that year. Dickinson was an economics professor at the University of Illinois. SMU claims the 1935 national title without qualification, even though they lost the Rose Bowl, as the Dickinson System was the first math system that was national in scope to select national champions.

SMU claims three national championships in football, including 1981, when SMU was one of five teams selected as co-champions by the National Championship Foundation, and 1982, when the team won the Cotton Bowl Classic and was selected as one of two co-champions by Bill Schroeder of the Helms Athletic Foundation as his last ever selection. All told, the Mustangs have played in 21 bowl games, including one appearance in the Rose Bowl, four appearances in the Cotton Bowl Classic, and four straight bowl appearances following the Mustangs' 2009 resurgence in football.

==== Southwest Conference Championships ====
- 1923
- 1926
- 1931
- 1935
- 1947
- 1948
- 1966
- 1981
- 1982
- 1984 (Note: Shared title.)

==== American Athletic Conference Championships ====
- 2023

==== Bowl appearances and results ====
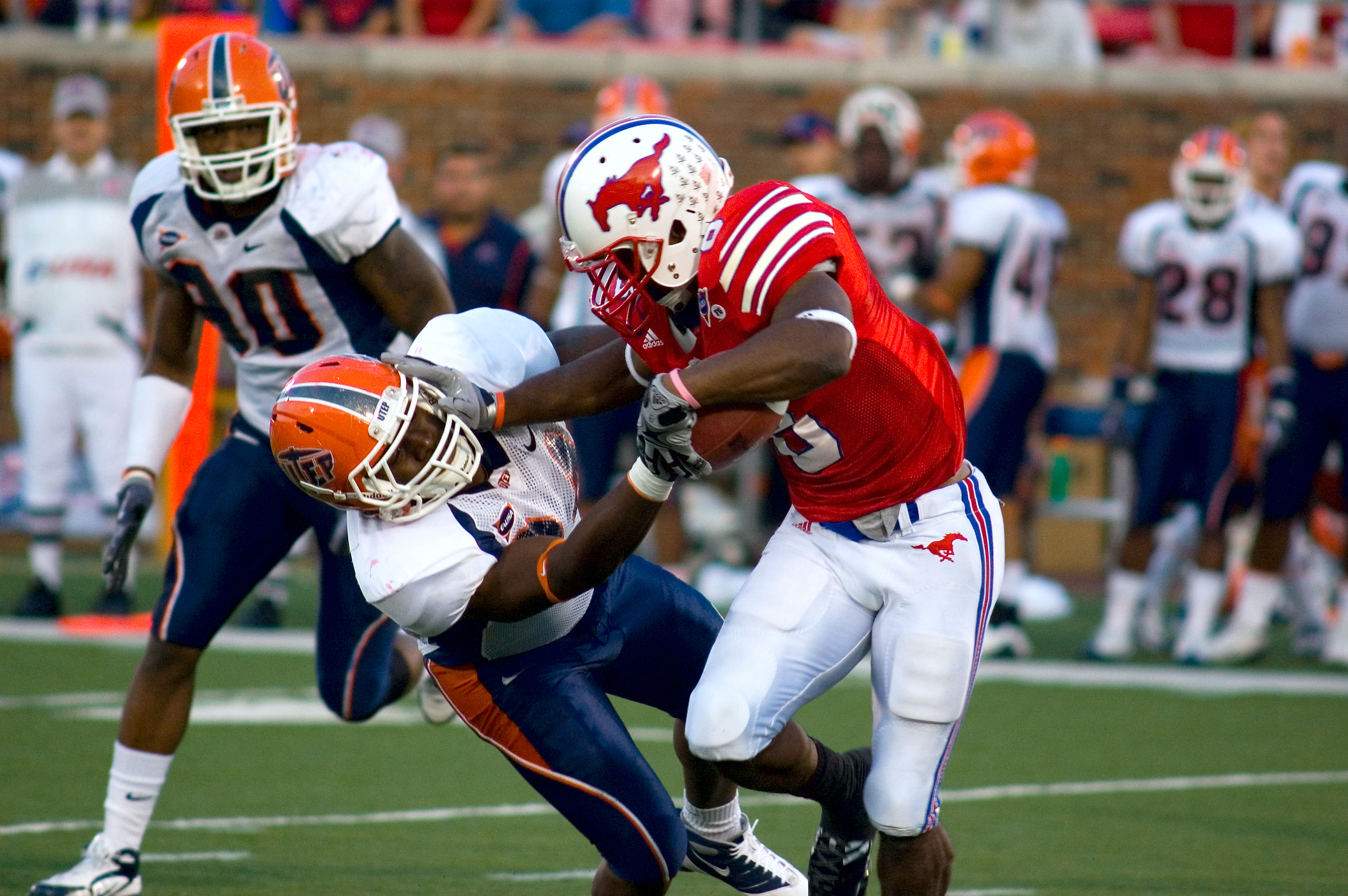
SMU in action versus UTEP in 2009

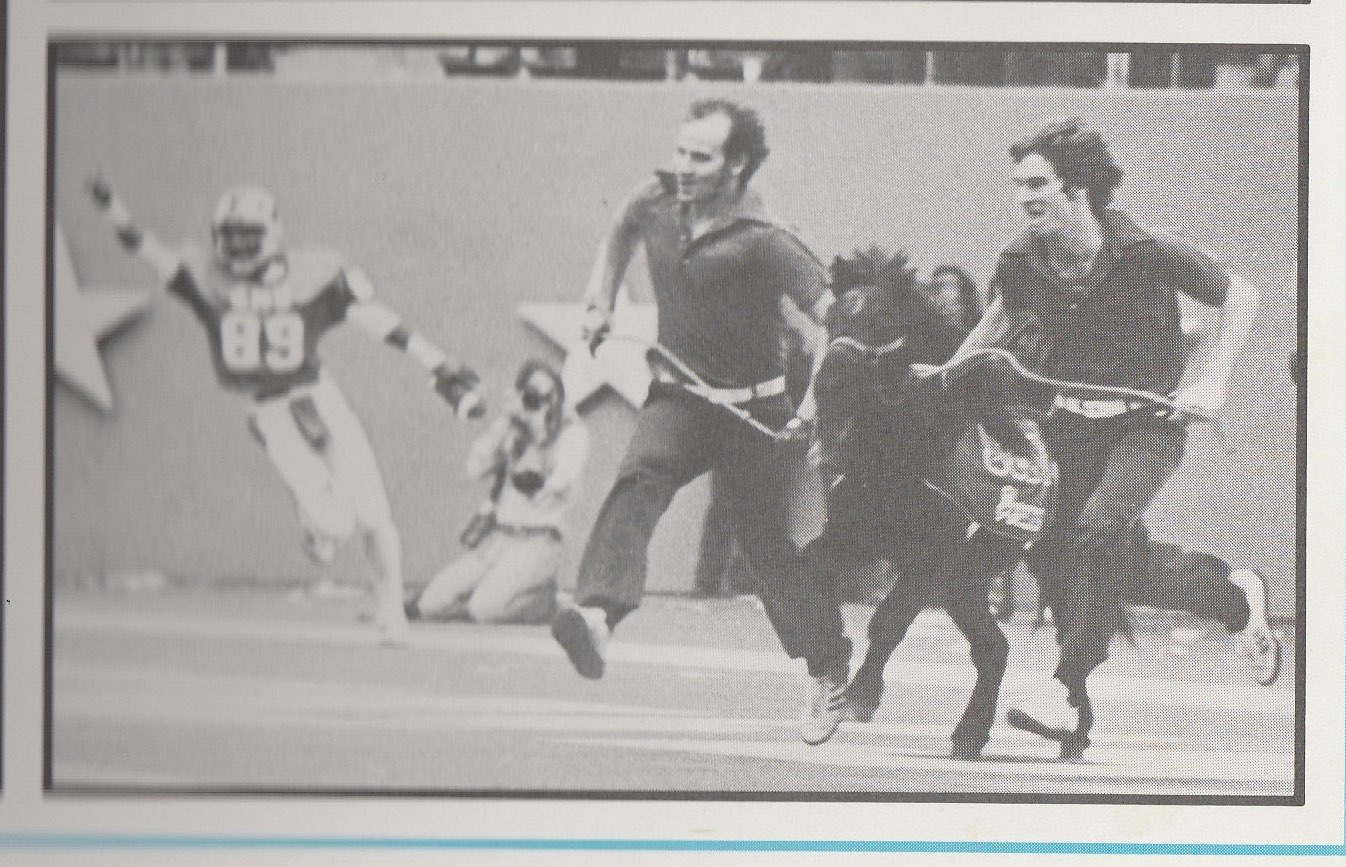
Peruna VI

Season	Bowl Game	Opponent	W/L	PF	PA
1924	Dixie Classic	West Virginia Wesleyan	L	7	9
1935	Rose Bowl	Stanford	L	0	7
1947	Cotton Bowl Classic	Penn State	T	13	13
1948	Cotton Bowl Classic	Oregon	W	21	13
1963	Sun Bowl	Oregon	L	14	21
1966	Cotton Bowl Classic	Georgia	L	9	24
1968	Bluebonnet Bowl	Oklahoma	W	28	27
1980	Holiday Bowl	BYU	L	45	46
1982	Cotton Bowl Classic	Pittsburgh	W	7	3
1983	Sun Bowl	Alabama	L	7	28
1984	Aloha Bowl	Notre Dame	W	27	20
2009	Hawaii Bowl	Nevada	W	45	10
2010	Armed Forces Bowl	Army	L	14	16
2011	BBVA Compass Bowl	Pittsburgh	W	28	6
2012	Hawaii Bowl	Fresno State	W	43	10
2017	Frisco Bowl	Louisiana Tech	L	10	51
2019	Boca Raton Bowl	Florida Atlantic	L	28	52
2022	New Mexico Bowl	BYU Cougars	L	23	24
2023	Fenway Bowl	Boston College Eagles	L	14	23
2024	CFP First Round (Note: Not an official bowl game, but part of the College Football Playoff.)	Penn State Nittany Lions	L	10	38
2025	Holiday Bowl	Arizona Wildcats	W	24	19

- SMU's closest rival in athletics is Texas Christian University (TCU) in Fort Worth, Texas. In football, SMU and TCU compete annually (with the exception of 2006) for the Iron Skillet. In 2005, an unranked SMU beat then 24th ranked TCU for SMU's first win against a ranked team in 19 years (since October 1986). TCU had won the previous seven football games played against SMU.
- SMU competed with the United States Naval Academy (Navy) for the Gansz Trophy. The Gansz Trophy is awarded to the winner of the United States Naval Academy and Southern Methodist University football game. It was created in 2009 through a collaboration between the two athletic departments. The trophy is named for Frank Gansz, who played linebacker at Navy from 1957 through 1959. Gansz later served as the head coach of the Kansas City Chiefs and on the coaching staffs at Navy and SMU. The most recent matchup between the two schools was on November 25, 2023, when SMU defeated Navy, 59–14.
- SMU once competed annually with Rice University in football for the Battle for the Mayor's Cup.
- The Doak Walker Award, an annual collegiate award given to the "most outstanding college running back", is named after SMU Heisman Trophy Winner Doak Walker.
- On November 11, 2006, redshirt freshman quarterback Justin Willis broke the single season touchdown pass record held by Chuck Hixson (21). Willis threw for three touchdowns in a 37–27 loss to Houston, setting the new single season record at 23. At the end of the season, Willis set the new record at 26. He also broke the SMU single season touchdown record accounting for 29 touchdowns. He was named to the Freshman All-American team at quarterback.
- SMU's current head coach is Rhett Lashlee, who was hired after the 2022 season after having been offensive coordinator and quarterbacks coach at the University of Miami. He had previously served as an assistant at several college programs, including a two-season stint as offensive coordinator and quarterbacks coach at SMU from 2018 to 2019.

==== The "death penalty" ====
On February 25, 1987, the Infractions Committee of the NCAA voted unanimously to cancel SMU's entire 1987 football season and all four of SMU's scheduled home games in 1988 in spite of SMU's cooperation and recommended sanctions. On April 11, 1987, SMU formally canceled the 1988 season, in effect, self-imposing a death penalty for a second football season.

The program was terminated for the 1987 season because the university was making approximately $61,000 in booster payments from 1985 to 1986. It later emerged that a "slush fund" had been used to pay players as early as the mid-1970s, and athletic officials had known about it as early as 1981.

SMU was eligible for this penalty because it had already been placed on probation less than five years prior to these violations – specifically, in 1985, for earlier recruiting violations. Since many players were poor, boosters would pay for rent or other bills for the parents of the athletes, and several key boosters and administration officials felt it would be unethical to cut off payments. When the sanctions were handed down, SMU had only three players – all seniors about to graduate – receiving payments.

Not long afterward, SMU announced that its football team would stay shuttered for the 1988 season as well after school officials received indications that they wouldn't have enough experienced players to field a viable team. As it turned out, new coach Forrest Gregg was left with an undersized and underweight lineup. It took the Mustang football program almost a decade to recover from the effects of the scandal, the team not returning to a bowl game until 2009 or winning a conference title until 2023. Since returning from the Death Penalty seasons, SMU has had six non-losing seasons, two of them .500 seasons.

=== Basketball ===
In men's basketball, the Mustangs have one Final Four Appearance accompanied by 14 Southwest Conference Championships. In July 2016, SMU hired Tim Jankovich to lead the Mustangs. Tim Jankovich retired in 2022.

The team has advanced to the postseason 12 times since 1993. SMU's women's basketball team hired Coach Travis Mays in 2016. In 2020-2021 the women's basketball team canceled the remainder of the season. After 5 seasons Travis Mays contract was not renewed and his overall record was 53–76.

=== Soccer ===
They have won a total of twenty nine conference championships:

- Southwest Conference (6): 1977, 1978, 1979, 1980, 1981, 1982
- Western Athletic Conference (5): 1997, 1998, 1999
- Missouri Valley Conference (4): 2000, 2001, 2002, 2003, 2004
- Conference USA (6): 2005, 2006, 2010, 2011, 2012
- American Athletic Conference (7): 2015, 2017, 2018, 2019, 2023
- Atlantic Coast Conference (1): 2025

Years in italics both regular season and tournament champion.

The men's soccer team has been a national contender, including a recent trip to the NCAA Tournament in 2025.

- During the 2006 season, the SMU men's soccer program was ranked No. 1 in the nation for four consecutive weeks. The team sat atop the four national polls with a record of 13–0–2 in the Adidas/NSCA poll, SoccerTimes.com poll, Soccer America Magazine poll, and the CollegeSoccerNews.com poll. Concurrently, the SMU women's soccer program cracked the top 25, at No. 22 in the Adidas/NSCA poll and No. 19 in the SoccerTimes.com poll.
- The SMU men's soccer team finished the 2006 regular season ranked No. 2 in the nation. Additionally, SMU won the CUSA title game, beating Kentucky 2–0 in Tulsa. This CUSA championship win is the sixth conference title for SMU since 1997.
- The SMU men's soccer team finished the 2010 season with an overall record of 16–2–2. The Mustangs finished the season with a trip to the quarterfinals where they lost to North Carolina in a penalty kick shootout.
- From 2013 to 2024, SMU won a total of 8 conference titles as a member of the American Athletic Conference, now known as the American Conference.
- In 2025, SMU secured its first Atlantic Coast Conference (ACC) Tournament title defeating Virginia 1–0.

=== Golf ===
The men's golf team won the 1954 NCAA Championship. In 2015, Bryson DeChambeau won the NCAA individual championship.

They have won ten conference championships:

- Southwest Conference (5): 1931, 1953, 1955, 1956, 1988
- Western Athletic Conference (2): 2004, 2005 (co-champions)
- Conference USA (1): 2006
- American Athletic Conference (1): 2014, 2022

In 2006, Golf Digest ranked the SMU men's golf program No. 16 in the nation. On May 1, 2007, SMU senior Colt Knost was named the Conference USA golfer of the year. He earned golfer of the week awards five times during his senior year, and can be recognized for shooting a record setting 64 for an amateur golfer. The 2015 team was given a postseason ban after multiple recruiting violations and unethical conduct under coach Josh Gregory. The decision also meant DeChambeau was unable to defend his title.

SMU's men's golf team was named the number 16 golf team in the nation by Golf Digest in 2006, and produced pro golfer Knost. Payne Stewart (class of 1979), was an elite player on the PGA Tour; he won three major titles and played on five Ryder Cup teams before his untimely death in 1999.

In 1979, Kyle O'Brien won the AIAW women's national intercollegiate individual golf championship.

=== Lacrosse ===
In October 2026, SMU announced it would launch a men's lacrosse team in the spring 2028 season. The Mustangs will become the sixth ACC program to sponsor men's lacrosse, giving the conference enough teams for an automatic berth in the NCAA tournament.

=== Swimming & diving ===
SMU men's swimming and diving was founded in 1932 in the former Southwest Conference. The men's and women's teams have acquired 57 conference titles combined, and have a total of 91 NCAA National Championship appearances. Six SMU swimmers/divers have been named NCAA swimmer/diver of the year. The Robson & Lindley Aquatic Center, the swimming and diving team's brand new Olympic sized pool, was built in 2017 to continue the legacy of successful swimming and diving at SMU.

After the American dropped men's swimming & diving at the end of the 2022–23 school year, SMU joined the Atlantic Sun Conference (ASUN) for that sport. With the ACC sponsoring swimming & diving for both sexes, the Mustangs only competed in the ASUN in the 2023–24 season.

=== Rowing ===
SMU women's rowing achieved a program-best fourth-place finish at the 2018 American Athletic Conference championship under first year head coach Kim Cupini. The first varsity four won the program's first gold medal and the first varsity eight won bronze. At the 2019 championship, the first varsity eight won gold, breaking University of Central Florida's long winning streak in the event. At the 2019 American Athletic Conference championship, SMU medaled in every racing category from the V8 to the 3V8. The team finished in second place with 176 points, 4 points fbelow first place.

=== Equestrian ===
The Women's Equestrian Team at SMU competed under the United Equestrian Conference (UEC) until 2019 and now compete under Eastern College Athletic Conference (ECAC). The Dallas Equestrian Center (DEC) is the official stables where the team practices and hosts meets. SMU won the 2023 and 2024 NCEA National Championships.

=== Cheer and Pom ===
The SMU Spirit Teams are competitive teams consisting of 30 to 40 young men and women. Many of the team's members compete at NCA and NDA College Nationals held in Daytona Beach, Florida, where the squads placed first in 2006, 2008, 2009, 2016, 2017, 2018, and 2021 in division 1A. SMU Cheer and Pom Squads cheer at all home football games, bowl games, men's and women's home basketball games, and tournament play. Members of the SMU Cheer and Pom Squads participate in community service events around campus and the Dallas area.

== Discontinued sports ==
SMU discontinued several sports in 1980; the university's financial position led to budget cuts across the university, and the university's athletic department had become too big to support.

=== Baseball ===
Southern Methodist University fielded a varsity baseball team from 1919 until it was discontinued after the 1980 season for financial reasons. The Mustangs won the 1953 SWC baseball title.

=== Men's Track & Field ===
The SMU Board of Trustees on Friday approved an athletics committee recommendation to drop the school's successful men's track and field program, a move based on gender equity in 2004.

SMU has competed in track and field since 1918, and has won three national championships. The Mustangs swept the NCAA indoor and outdoor titles in 1983, and won the 1986 outdoor title.

While it's been eight years since a national title, SMU finished in the top six at the NCAA indoor championships four of the past six seasons, and in the top 10 at the outdoor championships five of the past seven years.

The program produced 81 All-Americans and 28 Olympians, including Michael Carter, who won seven NCAA shotput titles before winning a silver medal in the 1984 Olympics.

The team finished the 2004 season and the school honored its 12 scholarships.

== Championships ==
=== NCAA team championships ===
SMU has won four NCAA team national championships.

- Men's (4)
  - Golf (1): 1954
  - Indoor Track & Field (1): 1983
  - Outdoor Track & Field (2): 1983, 1986
- see also:
  - American Conference NCAA team championships
  - List of NCAA schools with the most NCAA Division I championships

=== Other national team championships ===
SMU won the following national championships that are not bestowed by the NCAA. Football titles were chosen by NCAA-designated "major selectors" listed in its official Football Bowl Subdivision Records publication. While equestrian does not have an official NCAA championship, the sport is recognized by the NCAA as part of its Emerging Sports for Women program.

- Men's (3)
  - Football (1): 1935 (by four of 14 major selectors)
  - Football (1): 1981 (5-way tie, by one of 19 major selectors)
  - Football (1): 1982 (by one of 21 major selectors)
- Women's (10)
  - Golf (1): 1979 (AIAW)
  - Equestrian (2): 2023, 2024
  - Cheer and Pom (7): 2006, 2008, 2009, 2016, 2017, 2018, 2021

== Athletic venues ==
- Football: Gerald J. Ford Stadium (32,000)
- Basketball / Volleyball: Moody Coliseum (7,000)
- Soccer: Westcott Field (4,000)

== Mascot ==
Peruna is the official mascot and fight song of the Southern Methodist University (SMU) Mustangs, named after Peruna, a popular patent medicine (18 percent alcohol). The name "Peruna" is given to each successive live mascot. The mascot debuted in 1932, and since then a black Shetland pony, Peruna, has been present at every SMU home football game except for one. The mascot team consists of costumed Human Peruna, the live animal Peruna, and Peruna handlers. The team attends all home football games and many community events. The costumed mascot is also referred to as "Peruna." Peruna was selected the #10 Best College Mascot by America's Best and Top Ten in 2009.

== Athletic directors ==
- Matty Bell – 1947–1964
- Hayden Fry – 1964–1972
- Dave Smith – 1972–1974
- N.R. "Dick" Davis 1974–1978
- Russ Potts – 1978–1981
- Bob Hitch – 1981 – Dec. 1986
- Dudley Parker – Dec. 1986 – Oct. 1987
- Doug Single – Oct. 1987 – April 1990
- Forrest Gregg – April 1990 – June 1994
- Bill Lively – July 1994 – Dec. 1994
- Jim Copeland – Jan. 1995 – Feb. 2006
- Brian O'Boyle – Feb. – March 2006
- Steve Orsini – June 2006 – May 2012
- Rick Hart – July 2012 – March 2025
- Damon Evans - March 2025 – present

== Notable athletes ==
- Bryson DeChambeau - Two-time U.S. Open Winner; PGA Tour Pro
- Doak Walker — Heisman winner; Pro Football Hall of Fame Inductee
- Kyle Rote - Running back and receiver for eleven years in the National Football League (NFL) for the New York Giants, All-American running back at SMU, and was the first overall selection of the 1951 NFL Draft.
- Raymond Berry - Former professional American football player and coach in the National Football League (NFL), led the NFL in receptions and receiving yards three times and in receiving touchdowns twice, and was invited to six Pro Bowls. As head coach of the New England Patriots, Berry took them to Super Bowl in the 1985 season.
- Eric Dickerson — All-American; Pro Football Hall of Fame Inductee
- Haskell "Hack" Ross — trainer, Thoroughbred racing
- Forrest Gregg — two-time Super Bowl winner; Pro Football Hall of Fame Inductee; Vince Lombardi called him "the finest player I ever coached."
- Spike Davis — professional rugby player with the Ohio Aviators of PRO Rugby
- Jim Duggan — professional wrestler best known as "Hacksaw" Jim Duggan; WWE Hall of Fame Inductee 2011; inaugural WWE (WWF) Royal Rumble winner (1988)
- Emmanuel Sanders – Super Bowl Winner
- Rashee Rice – Super Bowl Winner
- Thomas Morstead – Super Bowl Winner
- Aldrick Robinson – Super Bowl Winner
- Courtland Sutton – Pro Bowl Wide Receiver
- Ja'Gared Davis - 106th Grey Cup Winner
- Payne Stewart - Professional Golfer; PGA Championship Winner; two-time U.S. Open Winner
- Ryan Berube - Olympic Gold medal anchoring the U.S. men's team in the 4×200-meter freestyle relay and All-American Swimmer
- Jerry Heidenreich - Olympic champion, former world record-holder, and All-American Swimmer
- Lars Frölander - Olympic Gold Medal (Sweden) and All-American Swimmer
- Steve Lundquist - Olympic gold medalist, former world record-holder, and All-American Swimmer
- Ricardo Prado - Olympic, All-American and former World Record holding medley Swimmer from Brazil
- Scott Donie - All-American Diver. He earned the silver medal in the 1992 Summer Olympics on the 10 m platform
- Martina Moravcová - Two-time Olympic silver medalist from Slovakia and All-American Swimmer
- Michael Carter - An American former collegiate and professional football player and track and field athlete. He was a three-time Pro Bowl and four-time All-Pro selection, and an Olympic athlete, winning a silver medal in the shot put in the 1984 Summer Olympics.

The SMU football program has also produced other professional football standouts, such as Don Meredith, Kyle Rote, Jerry Ball, Craig James and more recently Cole Beasley, Sterling Moore, Chris Banjo, Kenneth Acker and Taylor Thompson. They are considered the best football team back then when they were ranked number 1 in 1982.
