= Game of the Century (college football) =

Title for several college football games

The phrase "Game of the Century" is a superlative that has been applied to several college football games, usually regular-season matchups between two teams that are considered among the best that season. It is a subjective term applied by sportswriters to describe the most notable games of the period.

== Reuse of title ==
The phrase "Game of the Century" is sometimes placed in quotation marks to indicate the irony or emphasize the incorrectness of the term as it applies to college football games.

What makes the phrase subjective is that sportswriters and fans list the games that they remember or attended. Games that were played before radio and television broadcasts are only preserved in print. Working sportswriters have a history that goes back at most to the middle of the 20th century. Television and the Internet have made broadcasts of more recent games available to all. Unlike the "Game of the Century" in college basketball, or the 1958 NFL Championship Game, which is commonly called "The Greatest Game Ever Played", no specific college football game has changed the sport as dramatically. On a list of historically significant college football games, the games listed below have stood out.

== Criteria ==
The primary criterion for being a "Game of the Century" is for the game to be billed as such by the football press.

=== No. 1 vs No. 2 ===
Some of the games were a No. 1 vs No. 2 in the AP Poll, and then later to the BCS rankings and now College Football Playoff rankings, which happened only 31 times in the 20th century. Quite often a winning streak is on the line and the winner goes on to win the national championship. The prospect of two juggernaut teams on a roll, or "the irresistible force meets the immovable object", creates a high-interest spectacle.

Not all No. 1 vs. No. 2 matchups are a "Game of the Century", as seen in a numerous 20th-century games listed below.

While the Bowl Championship Series was created to produce a matchup of the top two teams in the nation at the end of the year, a BCS championship game does not automatically constitute a "Game of the Century". Otherwise, every year's championship game would be such.

=== Unexpected outcome ===
The "Game of the Century" is not always a decisive win. Occasionally, the title is applied to games where the outcome is in doubt until the game is played.

Some matchups are "Game of the Century" before being played because of what's on the line. Some become "Game of the Century" because people can't believe what they saw. –David Leon Moore

== 20th century ==
In each listing, the visiting team is listed first unless the game was played at a neutral site, in which case the teams are listed in alphabetical order. All rankings are from the AP Poll.

=== 1935 Notre Dame vs. Ohio State ===
	1	2	3	4	Total
Notre Dame	0	0	0	18	18
Ohio State	7	6	0	0	13

November 2, 1935: A then Ohio Stadium record crowd of 81,018 witnessed what was billed as The Game of the Century, the first ever meeting between Ohio State and Notre Dame. Ohio State led 13–0 heading into the fourth, but Notre Dame rallied with three fourth-quarter touchdowns and fed off several OSU miscues to pull out an 18–13 win. Notre Dame's Bill Shakespeare, a Cincinnati native, threw the game-winning 19-yard pass to Wayne Millner with 32 seconds left. Tickets for this game sold for $50 each ($1,177 in 2025) and there were widespread reports of counterfeit tickets. OSU officials said they could have sold 200,000 tickets for the game if they had room. The Ohio State-Notre Dame game was the most covered and most popular game of 1935.

=== 1935 SMU vs. TCU ===
	1	2	3	4	Total
SMU	7	7	0	6	20
TCU	0	7	0	7	14

November 30, 1935: Before a crowd of up to 42,000, the undefeated and untied TCU Horned Frogs (10–0) hosted the SMU Mustangs (10–0) in a late-season matchup that noted sportswriter Grantland Rice called a "Game of the Century". The conference championship for the Southwest Conference was on the line, as was a possible invitation to the Rose Bowl, which would be the first time a team from Texas participated. The game was the first in the state to be broadcast nationally on radio and noted sportswriters from across the country traveled to see it. While the Mustangs established a 14–7 lead in the first half, a touchdown pass by TCU's Sammy Baugh tied the score early in the fourth quarter. The Mustangs' Bob Finley responded with a fake punt play that resulted in a touchdown pass to Bob Wilson, with the Mustangs winning 20–14. While the Mustangs went on to lose in the Rose Bowl, the Horned Frogs won their Sugar Bowl game against the LSU Tigers, with both teams finishing with an identical record of 12–1 and both claiming a mythical national championship for the season.

=== 1945 Army vs. Navy ===
	1	2	3	4	Total
#1 Army	20	0	6	6	32
#2 Navy	0	7	0	6	13

December 1, 1945: Heading into the final game of the season both Army (8–0) and Navy (7–0–1) were undefeated and ranked No. 1 and No. 2 respectively, and with both teams buoyed by the recent victory in World War II, this game had all the earmarkings of a potential classic. President Harry S. Truman even decided to attend. However, the match-up did not live up to its pre-game "Game of the Century" billing as West Point would go on to win in a rout. A three touchdown, 20-point first quarter gave Army a lead they would not yield, going on to win 32–13.

=== 1946 Army vs. Notre Dame ===
	1	2	3	4	Total
#1 Army	0	0	0	0	0
#2 Notre Dame	0	0	0	0	0

November 9, 1946: The Army Cadets, then ranked Number 1 in the Associated Press college football poll, played the Notre Dame Fighting Irish, of South Bend, Indiana, ranked Number 2, at Yankee Stadium in New York City.

This matchup, with the national attention it got in the era before the service academies ceased to be major football powers, was usually played at a neutral site, often in New York City. The 1924 game between the schools, a Notre Dame victory at the Polo Grounds, was the game at which sportswriter Grantland Rice christened the Fighting Irish backfield—quarterback Harry Stuhldreher, halfbacks Jim Crowley and Don Miller, and fullback Elmer Layden – the "Four Horsemen." The 1928 edition, with Notre Dame trailing Army at halftime at Yankee Stadium, was the game where Notre Dame coach Knute Rockne delivered his "Win one for the Gipper" speech, resulting in a comeback win for the Fighting Irish.

Both teams were undefeated going into the 1946 game at Yankee Stadium. Both teams averaged over 30 points per game. Army had a 25-game winning streak over four years, last losing to Notre Dame in 1943 (26–0), but had won the last two contests between the schools by scores of 59–0 and 48–0. Army had the defending Heisman Trophy winner, Doc Blanchard, also known as "Mr. Inside", the man who would win it that year, Glenn Davis, also known as "Mr. Outside", and one of the nation's top quarterbacks in Arnold Tucker. Notre Dame had the quarterback who would win the Heisman the next year, Johnny Lujack. Both Tucker and Lujack were also outstanding defensive backs at a time when football players, college as well as professional, usually played both offense and defense. Just the previous year, in a game also labeled the "game of the century" before it was played, Army defeated a 7–0–1 Navy team 32–13. Navy's lone tie was against Notre Dame.

Despite the high-scoring and much-hyped offenses, the game ended in a scoreless tie, with each school's best chance at a scoring drive coming back-to-back: Tucker intercepting Lujack, and Lujack then making a touchdown-saving tackle on Blanchard a few plays later. Notre Dame's defense did something no other team had ever done — it held the famous "Touchdown Twins", Blanchard and Davis, to a total of 79 yards. As an indication of how the defense of both teams dominated, seven linemen in that game were nominated for Lineman of the Week honors in the weekly Associated Press poll. Joe Steffy, an Army guard who helped shut down the Notre Dame running game, won the honor, followed closely by Notre Dame right tackle George Sullivan and freshman lineman Jim Martin who helped stifle Army's running attack and dropped Davis on consecutive plays for losses totalling 17 yards. Both Notre Dame coach Frank Leahy and Army coach Earl Blaik called the game "a terrific battle of defenses."

Both team finished the season undefeated with this one tie, but it was Notre Dame that was awarded the national championship by the Associated Press, with Army coming in second. Neither school accepted bowl bids during that era, although a bowl loss would not have affected the national championship outcome since these were named before the postseason bowls in this era. Army declined an invitation to play in the 1947 Rose Bowl. The Army Black Knights / Cadets / the Corps Football media guide lists the 1946 team as national champions.

With Blanchard, Davis and Tucker having graduated, Army's winning streak would be broken the next year, by Columbia University. Notre Dame would not lose until early in the 1950 season. Sporting News named the 1944–45 Army Black Knights / Cadets / the Corps and 1946 Fighting Irish the second and fifth greatest teams of the 20th century respectively.

=== 1962 USC vs. Wisconsin ===
The 1963 Rose Bowl was the 49th edition of the college football bowl game, played at the Rose Bowl in Pasadena, California on Tuesday, January 1, at the end of the 1962 season. The top-ranked USC Trojans defeated the Wisconsin Badgers, 42–37. This was the first #1 versus #2 match-up in a bowl game. The quarterbacks, Ron Vander Kelen of Wisconsin and Pete Beathard of USC, were named co-Players of the Game.

Down 42–14 in the fourth quarter, Vander Kelen put together a number of drives to score 23 unanswered points and put the Badgers in position to win the game. Due to the historic #1 versus #2 bowl match-up, the number of Rose Bowl records set, and the furious fourth quarter rally by Wisconsin, this game frequently appears on lists of "greatest bowl games of all time."

=== 1966 Notre Dame vs. Michigan State ===
	1	2	3	4	Total
#1 Notre Dame	0	7	0	3	10
#2 Michigan State	0	10	0	0	10

November 19, 1966: Notre Dame Fighting Irish vs. Michigan State Spartans, at Spartan Stadium in East Lansing, Michigan. Notre Dame, which had not won a national championship since 1949, was ranked No. 1 in one poll and No. 2 in the other. Defending National Champion Michigan State entered the game ranked No. 2 in one poll and No. 1 in the other. This was the first time in 20 years that a college football game was given the "Game of the Century" tag by the national media.

The game was not shown live on national TV. The agreement between the NCAA and ABC in effect at the time limited each team to one national television appearance and two regional television appearances each season. Notre Dame had used their national TV slot in the season opening game against Purdue. ABC executives did not even want to show the game anywhere but the regional area, but pressure from the West Coast and the South (to the tune of 50,000 letters) made ABC air the game on tape delay.

Irish quarterback Terry Hanratty was knocked out after getting sacked in the first quarter by Spartan defensive lineman Bubba Smith. Starting Notre Dame running back Nick Eddy was out entirely after hurting his shoulder getting off the train in East Lansing. Michigan State held a 10–0 lead by early in the second quarter. But the Irish came back, scoring a touchdown right after Michigan State's field goal and tied the game on the first play of the fourth quarter. Notre Dame had the ball on its own 30-yard line with 1:10 to go, needing about 40 yards for a game-winning field goal. But Notre Dame coach Ara Parseghian chose to run the clock out, not wanting to risk a turnover, preserving the tie and Notre Dame's No. 1 ranking. The game ended in a 10–10 tie.

For the subsequent 50 years, Parseghian defended his end-of-the-game strategy, which left many fans feeling disappointed at the game not having some sort of resolution. College football expert Dan Jenkins led off his article for Sports Illustrated by saying Parseghian chose to "Tie one for the Gipper." Others chided Notre Dame by calling them the "Tying Irish" instead of the "Fighting Irish."

Notre Dame beat Rose Bowl bound USC 51–0 in Los Angeles the next week, completing an undefeated regular season and moving them to No. 1 in both polls. The Irish did not accept bowl bids until 1969, and Michigan State was the victim of a pair of Big Ten rules that would be rescinded a few years later: the same school could not represent the league in the Rose Bowl in back-to-back seasons, and only the league Champions could accept a bowl bid, unless they refused the Rose Bowl bid or, because it was on probation, were prohibited from accepting the bid, which, in either case, would then go to the second-place team. So despite being Big Ten Champions and undefeated in the regular season, in each case for two seasons in a row, the Spartans could not play in the Rose Bowl.

The Sporting News named the 1966 Fighting Irish and 1965–66 Spartans the eleventh and thirteenth greatest teams of the 20th Century respectively.

=== 1967 UCLA vs. USC ===
	1	2	3	4	Total
#1 UCLA	7	0	7	6	20
#4 USC	7	7	0	7	21

November 18, 1967: The UCLA Bruins, ranked Number 1 in both polls, played the USC Trojans, ranked Number 2 in the coaches poll and 4 in the AP poll. The Bruins had senior quarterback Gary Beban as the leading Heisman Trophy candidate and the Trojans had junior running back O. J. Simpson also as a strong Heisman candidate in a showcase game for player of the year. This is widely regarded as the signature game in the UCLA–USC rivalry. The game would be broadcast live and in color in ABC's second season of covering college football.

At the time, both teams played their home games at the Los Angeles Memorial Coliseum. Both teams wore their home uniforms, as was their custom for this rivalry when they shared a common home field. This game was for the "championship of Los Angeles", for the championship of the AAWU conference, and for Rose Bowl berth. This game was also for the wire service national championship, since the final AP poll would be published before the bowl games. The loser would not only miss out on the national championship, but would not even go to a bowl game, since the AAWU's agreement with the Rose Bowl allowed only one school to represent the league in the postseason.

With the game tied 14–14 early in the fourth quarter, an injured Beban gamely threw a touchdown pass, but the extra point attempt was blocked, resulting in a 20–14 UCLA lead. Trojan quarterback Toby Page called a pass play, then saw the Bruin linebackers drop back into pass coverage. He changed the signals before the snap, and handed off to Simpson, who ran 64 yards for a touchdown. USC kicked the extra point and held on to win 21–20.

As a result of this game, USC finished the season ranked Number 1 in both polls and would go on to defeat the Indiana Hoosiers in the 1968 Rose Bowl. UCLA would finish the season out of the AP top ten poll and Number 11 in the UPI poll. Despite the loss, Beban would win the Heisman; Simpson would win it the next season.

Keith Jackson, who covered the game for ABC, declared it many years later to be the greatest game he has ever seen. So did Giles Pellerin, a USC graduate who attended every game USC played from 1926 until his death at the 1998 USC-UCLA game at the Rose Bowl, 797 straight games over 72 years. Both USC broadcasters Tom Kelly and Pete Arbogast have stated that it was the greatest win in Trojan Football history.

The Sporting News named the 1967 Trojans one of the greatest teams of the 20th century.

=== 1969 Texas vs. Arkansas ===
	1	2	3	4	Total
#1 Texas	0	0	0	15	15
#2 Arkansas	7	0	7	0	14

December 6, 1969: University of Texas vs. University of Arkansas. In a game between unbeatens played at Arkansas' Razorback Stadium in Fayetteville, the Texas Longhorns were ranked No. 1 in the country, having won 18 straight games. The Arkansas Razorbacks were ranked No. 2, having won 15 straight.

This game would decide the Southwest Conference Championship, as well as its berth in the Cotton Bowl Classic, setting it up to win the national championship. Sensing that the matchup might be a possible 1-vs.-2 showdown, ABC offered to move the game from October 18 to December 6 to give it more of a national audience to showcase the 100th year of college football, and the schools, enjoying the publicity, accepted. Thanks to a fortuitous upset of top-ranked Ohio State by Michigan, which elevated Texas and Arkansas to the top two spots, the move worked, making their game the focus of the entire American sporting scene. The game pulled a television rating of a 50 share, meaning half the TV sets in the country were tuned to this game.

President Richard Nixon attended the game along with several members of his staff and U.S. Representatives George H. W. Bush of Texas and John Paul Hammerschmidt of Arkansas, having announced that he would give a plaque to the winner, proclaiming it to be the National Champion – to the chagrin of observers who thought it premature to do so before the New Year's Day bowl games, and of fans of Pennsylvania State University, which would also end the season undefeated. Arkansas took a 14–0 lead, and held it into the fourth quarter, but Texas came from behind to win, 15–14, and accepted Nixon's plaque.

The signature play of the game came in the 4th quarter with Texas trailing 14–8. The Longhorns, normally a conservative power running team, faced 4th and 3 and chose to gamble with a deep play action pass. Quarterback James Street was so surprised by the call that he asked head coach Darrell Royal "Are you sure?" before heading to the huddle. Despite double coverage, Street hit Randy Peschel with a 43-yard pass to keep the drive alive. Texas scored to take the lead 2 plays later.

Texas beat Notre Dame in the Cotton Bowl Classic, and removed any doubt as to whether it deserved consideration as National Champion, although Penn State fans still insist that their team, also undefeated and winner of the Orange Bowl, was better. However, it is worth noting that the Cotton Bowl Classic first invited Penn State to play the Southwest Conference champions. The Nittany Lions declined the invitation due to segregation issues, which would have resulted in them playing Texas and only one team ending the year undefeated, preferring to spend New Year's Day in warm Miami, where they defeated Big 8 champion Missouri. The 1969 Texas-Penn State conflict, never settled on the field, remains one of the lasting arguments in College Football history. Arkansas lost the Sugar Bowl to Ole Miss. The entire Texas-Penn State debate and Nixon's involvement led to a quote from Penn State coach Joe Paterno, a conservative Republican, during a commencement speech at Penn State in 1973 about Nixon, "How could Nixon know so much about college football in 1969 and so little about Watergate in 1973?"

This game has been nicknamed "Dixie's Last Stand", since it was the last major American sporting event played between two all-white teams, although almost the entire Southeastern Conference teams did not integrate their varsity football squads until the mid-1970s.

With the Vietnam War still raging and Nixon in attendance, protesters came to the game, and one of them got into a tree overlooking the stadium and held up an antiwar sign. The racial and political implications and the build-up to the game were the subject of a 2005 book, Horns, Hogs and Nixon Coming, which paid special attention to the demonstrations by anti-war and anti-racist groups. An urban legend grew up around this game, claiming that this protester was Arkansas native and future President Bill Clinton. Clinton, however, was not at the game, as he was then a Rhodes Scholar at the University of Oxford in England, and was listening to the game on a shortwave radio with some American friends.

The two coaches in this game, Darrell Royal of Texas and Frank Broyles of Arkansas, both retired after the 1976 season and became athletic directors at their respective schools. Broyles, who retired as the Razorbacks' men's athletic director on December 31, 2007, spearheaded Arkansas' move from the Southwest Conference to the SEC in 1990. Broyles was instrumental in the Razorbacks and Longhorns playing a two-year series in 2003 (at Austin) and 2004 (at Fayetteville). After the 1976 season, Broyles also became a top color analyst for College Football on ABC, often pairing up with Keith Jackson.

The Sporting News named the 1969 Longhorns the seventh greatest team of the 20th century.

=== 1971 Nebraska vs. Oklahoma ===
	1	2	3	4	Total
#1 Nebraska	7	7	14	7	35
#2 Oklahoma	3	14	7	7	31

November 25, 1971: In 1971, Nebraska and Oklahoma were each among the best teams of the era, combining for seventeen of twenty-two all-Big Eight selections and twelve staff members who became FBS or NFL head coaches. The headline matchup was Nebraska's defense (allowing 6.4 points per game and leading the country in total defense) against Oklahoma's new wishbone offense (scoring 44.6 points per game and leading the country in total offense). In its first full season using the wishbone, Oklahoma averaged an NCAA-record 472 rushing yards per game behind "wishbone wizard" Jack Mildren. Defending national champion Nebraska entered the game on a twenty-game win streak and had won each of its first ten games by at least twenty-seven points. The buildup to the Thanksgiving Day game was unprecedented – Oklahoma expanded the press box at Owen Field to accommodate credential requests from over one hundred reporters across twenty states. OU coach Chuck Fairbanks shut off phones in the football dormitory, while Nebraska brought its own provisions to Norman to avoid the risk of food poisoning.

Nebraska took a 7–0 lead on a seventy-two-yard punt return by wingback Johnny Rodgers. Though it was early in the first quarter, the return became the game's and one of college football's signature moments, largely due to play-by-play announcer Lyell Bremser's radio call: "holy moly! Man, woman, and child did that put 'em in the aisles! Johnny "The Jet" Rodgers just tore 'em loose from their shoes!" After stopping an eighty-five-yard Oklahoma drive short of the end zone, a second Nebraska touchdown stretched the lead to 14–3. NU's defensive game plan centered on containing Greg Pruitt on the wide tosses and sweeps that made the wishbone so explosive, providing Mildren a rare chance to showcase his passing abilities. Trailing 14–3, Mildren led a pair of long touchdown drives, capping the second with two deep passes to Jon Harrison that gave OU a 17–14 halftime lead. Nebraska suddenly faced its first deficit of the season against an offense that had already accumulated more yards than NU had allowed in an entire game.

Nebraska made sweeping changes to its game plan at halftime, committing to the run game on offense and providing support to its overwhelmed secondary. A long run by quarterback Jerry Tagge set up a touchdown to retake the lead, and minutes later, a third Jeff Kinney score made it 28–17 with 3:38 remaining in the third quarter. Oklahoma again faced an eleven-point deficit, responding with a lengthy drive highlighted by a fifty-one-yard reverse pass to Al Chandler. A Tagge fumble in OU territory was followed by a twelve-play drive and a second Harrison touchdown, giving the Sooners a 31–28 lead with 7:10 to play. Tagge methodically led the Cornhuskers down the field, converting a third down on a diving catch by Rodgers. Once in the red zone, Kinney carried four consecutive times, the last of which gave Nebraska a 35–31 lead with 1:38 remaining; his dive into the end zone with his tearaway jersey in tatters became one of the game's iconic images. Mildren overthrew a potential touchdown on the ensuing possession and a turnover on downs ended the game.

The game – which featured 829 offensive yards, four lead changes, and just two penalties – was met with universal praise: Dave Kindred wrote "they can quit playing now, they have played the perfect game," while the UPI's Charlie Smith said "P. T. Barnum and Ben-Hur met on a football field Tuesday." Sports Illustrated's Dan Jenkins suggested "it was the greatest collegiate football battle ever," a sentiment that has been maintained since, as it is often considered the best game in the sport's history. The game was viewed by fifty-five to sixty million people, the largest college football audience ever at the time.

Weeks later, Nebraska wrapped up a second consecutive national championship with a dominant victory in the 1972 Orange Bowl. The team is regarded as one of the best in college football history. The Nebraska–Oklahoma rivalry ended when NU joined the Big Ten Conference in 2011, but was renewed in 2021 and 2022 to commemorate the fiftieth anniversary of the Game of the Century.

=== 1986 Miami (FL) vs. Penn State ===
	1	2	3	4	Total
#1 Miami	0	7	0	3	10
#2 Penn State	0	7	0	7	14

January 2, 1987: In the next "Game of the Century", the largest television audience in college football history watched as the undefeated and No. 1 Miami Hurricanes battled the undefeated and No. 2 Penn State Nittany Lions in the Fiesta Bowl Game for the NCAA Division I-A Football National Championship. The game garnered a 25.1 television rating, with an average of 21,940,000 viewers watching the NBC telecast per minute.

Of the two teams, Miami had the star-power, as it was led by Heisman Trophy-winning quarterback Vinny Testaverde, running back Alonzo Highsmith, and defensive tackle Jerome Brown, all of whom would be selected within the first nine picks of that April's NFL draft. Miami was seldom challenged during the regular season and was considered a prohibitive favorite over the gritty Nittany Lions. Tensions between the teams were heightened when Miami players attended a Fiesta Bowl barbecue held days before the game dressed in fatigues.

The game played out in surprising fashion. Miami's offense had little trouble moving the ball, yet the vaunted Penn State defense was able to pressure Testaverde enough (four sacks) that the Hurricanes committed a whopping seven turnovers (five interceptions, two fumbles). Miami scored first to take a 7–0 lead, but Penn State would answer with a touchdown of its own to tie it up at 7 at halftime. Miami added a field goal early in the fourth quarter to take a 10–7 lead, but momentum swung when Penn State linebacker Shane Conlan intercepted a pass from Testaverde and returned it 38 yards to the Miami 5. D. J. Dozier would then score on a six-yard run to give Penn State its first lead of the night at 14–10.

The score was still 14–10 when Miami took over at its own 23 with just over 3 minutes left. Testaverde was masterful on the drive, converting a key 4th-and-six pass from Miami's own 27 to Brian Blades for a 31-yard gain and at one point completing six straight passes to take the Canes all the way down to the Penn State 6 with just 18 seconds left. But on the next play, Penn State fooled Testaverde when the Lions decided to drop eight men back in pass coverage and rushed just three. Testaverde failed to read the coverage and his pass was intercepted at the goal line by linebacker Pete Giftopoulos, sealing the upset win for Penn State.

Miami dominated the game statistically, racking up 445 total yards and 22 first downs to just 162 yards and 8 first downs for Penn State. But in the end, it was Penn State that walked away with the victory—and the national championship.

=== 1991 Miami (FL) vs. Florida State ===
	1	2	3	4	Total
#2 Miami	7	0	0	10	17
#1 Florida State	3	7	3	3	16

November 16, 1991: In a game that featured in-state rivals Florida State University and the University of Miami, ranked No. 1 and No. 2 in the nation respectively, Miami won by one point after Florida State's kicker Gerry Thomas missed a field goal wide right with 29 seconds left in the game. Because of this dramatic ending, the game became known as the "Wide Right" game. Miami would go on that season to split the national championship with Washington.

=== 1993 Florida State vs. Notre Dame ===
	1	2	3	4	Total
#1 Florida State	7	0	7	10	24
#2 Notre Dame	7	14	3	7	31

November 13, 1993: In a match-up of unbeatens, Florida State University was ranked No. 1, and Notre Dame was ranked No. 2. The winner of this game, at Notre Dame Stadium in South Bend, Indiana, was certain to play Number 3 Nebraska (which would then move up to Number 2) in the Orange Bowl for the national championship.

Florida State had quarterback Charlie Ward, who would win the Heisman Trophy. Notre Dame was the underdog, but had home-field advantage.

It was a game between the most-hyped program of the era and the most-hyped program in college football history, and NBC, which had exclusive rights to Fighting Irish home games (and was thus mocked by some as the "Notre Dame Broadcasting Company", much as CBS was ripped as the "Cowboys Broadcasting System" in the 1970s and 1980s), tried to market this matchup as the "Game of the Century." There was considerable media discussion as to whether the game would live up to the hype, and, if not, how bad NBC would look. ESPN would also hype the game, showing FSU players touring the Notre Dame campus that week wearing green hats with shamrocks and gold-embroidered FSU initials on the front, and having the first on-campus edition of College GameDay from South Bend. The Peacock Network did not have to worry, because they got the classic they hoped for.

The Irish appeared to be riding those mystiques the entire game, leading 31–17 as the Seminoles got the ball with 1:39 to play. But Ward drove the 'Noles down the field, and hit Kez McCorvey on 4th-and-20 for a touchdown that bounced off Irish safety Brian McGee. Notre Dame got the ball back, but went three-and-out, giving FSU one last shot. In just three plays, they got to the Irish 14 with three seconds to play. Ward rolled out and threw the ball in the end zone, but his pass was batted down by cornerback Shawn Wooden. Notre Dame won 31–24, and a sellout crowd stormed the field.

Unfortunately for the Irish, they subsequently lost to Boston College 41–39 on a last second field goal to scuttle their hoped-for Orange Bowl match-up. Florida State, meanwhile, ended up winning the consensus national championship, their first in school history, by defeating Nebraska 18–16 in that Orange Bowl.

== 21st century ==
=== 2005 Texas vs. USC ===
	1	2	3	4	Total
#2 Texas	0	16	7	18	41
#1 USC	7	3	14	14	38

Played on January 4, 2006, at the Rose Bowl in Pasadena, California, this college football bowl game served as the BCS National Championship Game for the 2005 College Football season and was seen as the Game of the Century. It featured the only two unbeaten teams of the 2005 NCAA Division I-A football season: the defending Rose Bowl champion and reigning Big 12 Conference champion Texas Longhorns played Pacific-10 Conference titleholders and two-time defending AP national champions, the USC Trojans.

The game was a back-and-forth contest; Texas's victory was not secured until the game's final 19 seconds. Vince Young, the Texas quarterback, and Michael Huff, a Texas safety, were named the offensive and defensive Rose Bowl Players of the Game. ESPN named Young's fourth-down, game-winning touchdown run the fifth-highest rated play in college-football history. The game is the highest-rated BCS game in TV history with 21.7% of households watching it, and is often considered the greatest college football national championship game of all time.

Texas's Rose Bowl win was the 800th victory in school history and the Longhorns ended the season ranked third in Division I history in both wins and winning percentage (.7143). It was only the third time that the two top-ranked teams had faced each other in Rose Bowl history, with the 1963 Rose Bowl and 1969 Rose Bowl games being the others.

This was the final game ever called by longtime broadcaster Keith Jackson (as well as the final Rose Bowl to telecast under ABC Sports branding); the 2007 Rose Bowl would be an ESPN on ABC presentation.

=== 2006 Michigan vs. Ohio State ===
	1	2	3	4	Total
#2 Michigan	7	7	10	15	39
#1 Ohio State	7	21	7	7	42

On November 18, 2006, Ohio State and Michigan met for their annual showdown, each carrying an 11–0 record, and billed as the Game of the Century. For the first time in the history of the rivalry, the two rivals faced off while holding the top two spots in the Bowl Championship Series rankings. Ohio State won 42–39 and became the outright Big Ten champion, earning the right to play for a national championship at the BCS National Championship Game in Glendale, Arizona. Michigan scored first with a touchdown run by junior running back Mike Hart, but the Buckeyes then scored 21 unanswered points, and at halftime, they were up 28–14. After an interception and a fumble recovery by junior defensive tackle Alan Branch, Michigan cut the Buckeyes' lead to 4 with 14 minutes to go in the fourth quarter. After appearing to have forced Ohio State into a fourth down situation with six minutes to go, Michigan junior outside linebacker Shawn Crable was called for roughing the QB, giving the Buckeyes a fresh set of downs. Ohio State quarterback Troy Smith then passed to Brian Robiskie for a touchdown, increasing the Buckeyes' lead to 42–31 with five minutes left in the game. After Ohio State was called for pass interference on a failed 4th down attempt, giving Michigan an automatic 1st down, junior quarterback Chad Henne found senior tight end Tyler Ecker for a 16-yard touchdown with two minutes to go to cut the OSU lead to 42–37. Senior wide receiver Steve Breaston caught the two-point conversion to bring the Wolverines within a field goal. Michigan needed to recover the ensuing onside kick, and they failed to do so. The Buckeyes ran out the clock for the victory which placed them into the BCS national championship game. Troy Smith completed 71% of his passes for 316 yards and four touchdowns, essentially clinching the Heisman trophy. Ohio State wide receiver Ted Ginn caught eight passes for 104 yards and a touchdown. Ohio State running back Antonio Pittman ran for 139 yards on 18 carries for a 7.7 yards-per-carry average. Michigan running back Mike Hart carried the ball 23 times for 142 yards and three touchdowns against a stout Buckeye defense. Chad Henne threw for 267 yards, two touchdowns, and no turnovers on a 60% completion percentage. The game was highly touted by ESPN/ABC (there was even a game countdown clock for a week before kickoff) and was viewed by the largest television audience for a regular season college football game since 1993, averaging 21.8 million viewers. The victory marked the first time in 43 years that the Buckeyes had won three consecutive games in the series. The game gained even more significance when, on the eve of the meeting, legendary Michigan head coach and former Ohio State assistant coach Bo Schembechler died. Schembechler was honored with a video tribute at Ohio Stadium as well as a moment of silence before kickoff. Half an hour after the game ended, the Ohio Lottery PICK 4 evening drawing was 4–2–3–9, matching the final score of the game and paying out up to $5,000 per winner, for a total payout of $2.2 million.

Following the game, there was a chance of a rematch in the BCS title game, but Florida was chosen over Michigan to be Ohio State's opponent. The game's long-term significance may have been diminished after disappointing post-season results for both teams—Ohio State would lose the 2007 BCS Championship Game to Florida 41–14, while Michigan suffered their sixth Rose Bowl loss to USC, 32–18.

=== 2009 Florida vs. Alabama ===
	1	2	3	4	Total
#1 Florida	3	10	0	0	13
#2 Alabama	9	10	7	6	32

The 2009 SEC Championship Game was played on December 5, 2009, in the Georgia Dome in Atlanta, Georgia, to determine the 2009 football champion of the Southeastern Conference (SEC). The game featured the Florida Gators and the Alabama Crimson Tide. The winner was all but assured to go on to play for a National Championship, in a likely matchup with the Texas Longhorns provided Texas won in the Big 12 Championship Game versus the north division champion Nebraska Cornhuskers. Entering the 2009 contest, the SEC East was 11–6 in SEC Championship games, with the Florida Gators accounting for seven of the eleven victories. Before the 2009 game, Alabama represented the SEC West six times in the conference championship game, compiling a 2–4 record, and had faced the Gators in all six of their previous SEC Championship game appearances. This was the first and so far the only time any conference championship game had featured two undefeated teams and was also the first time an AP Poll No. 1 played a No. 2 outside of the BCS Championship Game since the top-ranked Ohio State beat the second-ranked Michigan during the 2006 regular season.

Alabama defeated Florida 32–13 and as expected secured a berth to the 2010 BCS National Championship Game where they would go on to defeat Texas. This game is often considered the moment when the Alabama dynasty began in earnest after a disappointing 2007 season and a loss to the same Tebow-led Gators in the 2008 SEC Championship.

=== 2011 LSU vs. Alabama ===
	1	2	3	4	OT	Total
#1 LSU	0	3	0	3	3	9
#2 Alabama	0	3	3	0	0	6

On November 5, 2011, BCS-ranked No. 1 LSU traveled to Tuscaloosa to take on No. 2 Alabama. In the only "Game of the Century" to go into overtime, LSU won a close game where only field goals were scored. The final result, 9–6, was determined in the first overtime period, with a kick from Drew Alleman. Another highlight was from special teams: A Brad Wing punt that went 72 yards and sailed over hobbled Crimson Tide player Marquis Maze's head. A decisive interception at LSU's one-yard line by Eric Reid in the fourth quarter likely saved the Tigers in regulation. Alabama's kickers missed a total of four field goals in the game, including a 52-yard attempt in overtime after being sacked by Sam Montgomery previous on 3rd down. Alleman's winning field goal followed on what appeared to be a touchdown on a Michael Ford sweep, but he stepped out of bounds at the 7-yard line. This set up Alleman's game-winning field goal. As a "Game of the Century" it has been "roundly criticized as a dud because neither team scored a touchdown". It is the lowest scoring No. 1 vs No. 2 match-up since the 1946 Army-Notre Dame game, which ended 0–0. The two teams met again in the 2012 BCS National Championship Game. This time, the Crimson Tide shut out LSU 21–0, with the Tigers not even advancing the ball out of their own half until the 3rd quarter. The 2011 Alabama/LSU contests are also remembered for the abundance of future NFL players who participated, with 45 players going on to be drafted, including 16 of the 22 defensive starters.

=== 2019 LSU vs. Alabama ===
	1	2	3	4	Total
#2 LSU	10	23	0	13	46
#3 Alabama	7	6	7	21	41

On November 9, 2019, CFP-ranked No. 2 (AP-ranked #1) LSU travelled to take on CFP-ranked No. 3 (AP-ranked #2) Alabama in a game that was touted by some in the media as a "rematch" of the 2011 "Game of the Century". Before a crowd of 101,821 at Bryant–Denny Stadium (including President Donald Trump and First Lady Melania Trump), LSU defeated Alabama by the score of 46–41. LSU quarterback (and future Heisman Trophy winner) Joe Burrow completed 31 of 39 passes for 393 yards and three touchdowns in the first regular-season meeting between the top two teams in the Associated Press poll since the 2011 Game of the Century matchup between the same two teams. LSU lead 33–13 at halftime, the largest deficit a Nick Saban-coached Crimson Tide team had faced after 30 minutes. Alabama quarterback Tua Tagovailoa, still recovering from ankle surgery just 20 days prior, mounted an impressive comeback in the second half. With the score 46–34 and 1:37 to play, Tagovailoa (who finished 21-for-40 for 418 yards, four touchdowns, an interception and a fumble) hit DeVonta Smith for an 85-yard touchdown pass that provided the final margin. Justin Jefferson recovered the ensuing onside kick, and LSU was able to run out the clock to win the game.

Following the game, LSU moved from No. 2 to No. 1 in the College Football Playoff rankings and Coaches Poll (remaining No. 1 in the AP), while Alabama moved from No. 3 in the CFP to No. 5, and No. 2 to No. 4 in the AP and Coaches Polls. Alabama's subsequent loss in the Iron Bowl later that year would drop the Crimson Tide out of contention for the College Football Playoff for the first time in the history of the playoffs. LSU would go on to defeat the defending National Champion Clemson Tigers in the CFP National Championship game to cap off a perfect 15–0 season and be crowned National Champions for the first time in the CFP era. It was LSU's first time playing for the National Championship since the loss to Alabama in the 2012 BCS National Championship Game, and their first title since the 2007 season.

=== 2022 Tennessee vs. Georgia ===
	1	2	3	4	Total
#1 Tennessee	3	3	0	7	13
#3 Georgia	14	10	3	0	27

The 2022 Tennessee vs. Georgia football game was a major college football game between the AP-top-ranked Georgia Bulldogs vs the AP-second-ranked and CFP-top-ranked Tennessee Volunteers. The game is considered a "Game of the Century", as it pitted the two top-ranked teams in the NCAA Division I Football Bowl Subdivision, and it was the first such regular-season game since the 2019 LSU vs. Alabama game. It started on November 5, 2022, at 3:40 PM. No. 3 Georgia won in a one-sided shootout 27–13. Both teams entered the game undefeated and tied for first place in the Southeastern Conference's East Division.

=== 2025 Ohio State vs. Indiana ===
	1	2	3	4	Total
#2 Indiana	3	3	7	0	13
#1 Ohio State	7	3	0	0	10

The 2025 Big Ten Championship Game featured the No. 1 ranked Ohio State Buckeyes and the No. 2 ranked Indiana Hoosiers, to determine the champion of the Big Ten Conference for the 2025 season. This was the first Big Ten championship game to feature two undefeated teams and an AP and UPI No. 1 vs. No. 2 matchup. Adding to the intrigue of the game, both starting quarterbacks, Indiana's Fernando Mendoza and Ohio State's Julian Sayin, were considered favorites to win the Heisman Trophy. Indiana upset the Buckeyes to win their first Big Ten championship since 1967 and first outright conference title since 1945.

Following the game, Indiana moved from No. 2 to No. 1 in the rankings, while Ohio State moved from No. 1 to No. 2, still securing a first round bye alongside Indiana for the College Football Playoff. Ohio State ended up losing again to Miami in the Cotton Bowl as a ten-point favorite later that year. Meanwhile, Indiana would go on to defeat Alabama in the Rose Bowl, then Oregon in the Peach Bowl, and then defeated Miami in the CFP National Championship game to cap off a perfect 16–0 season and be crowned National Champions for the first time in school history.

== Books ==
- Celzic, Mike. The Biggest Game of Them All: Notre Dame, Michigan State and the Fall of 1966: ISBN 0-671-75817-9 (Michigan State – Notre Dame Game)
- Corcoran, Michael. The Game of the Century ISBN 0-7432-3621-1 (A detailed narrative of the 1971 Nebraska-Oklahoma game)
- Frei, Terry. Horns, Hogs and Nixon Coming: ISBN 0-7432-2447-7 (The details of the political climate in the leadup to this game in terms of racial tensions and anti-Vietnam War sentiments are documented in the book)
- White, Lonnie. (August 2004). UCLA vs. USC: 75 Years of the Greatest Rivalry in Sports: Los Angeles Times Books. (ISBN 1-883792-27-4) (UCLA – USC)
- Whittingham, Richard. (December 1985). Saturday Afternoon: College Football and the Men Who Made the Day: Workman Pub Co. ISBN 0-89480-933-4 (Synopsis of several of the listed games)
- Hoppel, Joe., Zesch, Steve., Nahrstedt, Mike. College Football's Twenty-Five Greatest Teams: The Sporting News. United States: Sporting News Publishing Company, 1988. ISBN 0-89204-281-8
