= 1935 TCU Horned Frogs football team =

American college football season

1935 TCU Horned Frogs football

National champion (Williamson) Sugar Bowl champion

Sugar Bowl, W 3–2 vs. LSU
- Conference: Southwest Conference
- Record: 12–1 (5–1 SWC)
- Head coach: Dutch Meyer (2nd season)
- Offensive scheme: Meyer spread
- Home stadium: Amon G. Carter Stadium

1935 Southwest Conference football standings
	Conf.					Overall
Team	W		L		T	W		L		T
No. 2 SMU $	6	–	0	–	0	12	–	1	–	0
No. 4 TCU	5	–	1	–	0	12	–	1	–	0
Baylor	3	–	3	–	0	8	–	3	–	0
Rice	3	–	3	–	0	8	–	3	–	0
Arkansas	2	–	4	–	0	5	–	5	–	0
Texas A&M	1	–	5	–	0	3	–	7	–	0
Texas	1	–	5	–	0	4	–	6	–	0
$ – Conference champion; Rankings from United Press

The 1935 TCU Horned Frogs football team represented Texas Christian University (TCU) in the 1935 college football season.

The Williamson System, recognized by the NCAA as a "major selector" of national championships, ranked TCU number one in its final post-bowl rankings.

TCU was led by second-year head coach Dutch Meyer. TCU and SMU again met to decide not only the SWC title but the first trip to the Rose Bowl for a team from the SWC. Grantland Rice of the New York Sun called it the "Game of the Century" and reported the following:

In a TCU Stadium that seated 30,000 spectators, over 36,000 wildly excited Texans and visitors from every corner of the map packed, jammed, and fought their way into every square foot of standing and seating space to see one of the greatest football games ever played...this tense, keyed up crowd even leaped the wire fences from the top of automobiles..."

SMU scored the first 14 points of the game. TCU, led by All-American quarterback Sammy Baugh, tied the game at the beginning of the fourth quarter. Then, with seven minutes left in the game SMU, on a 4th and 4 on the Frogs' 37 yard-line, lined up to punt. Quarterback Bob Finley threw a 50-yard pass to running back Bob Wilson who made what is described as a "jumping, twisting catch that swept him over the line for the touchdown". TCU would lose the game 20–14, but would be invited to play the LSU Tigers in the 1936 Sugar Bowl, where the Frogs would be victorious 3–2 at messy and muddy Tulane Stadium.

After the bowls, TCU ended the season ranked number one in the Williamson System final rankings. However, the system's creator wrote "there was no undisputable national champion in 1935" in his column accompanying the final rankings. SMU finished second and LSU third in the final Williamson rankings. The NCAA records book erroneously credits TCU and LSU as Williamson System co-national champions for the season. Southern Methodist University and the University of Minnesota were selected as national champions by other selectors.

== Schedule ==
Date	Opponent	Site	Result	Attendance	Source
September 21	Howard Payne*	Amon G. Carter Stadium; Fort Worth, TX	W 41–0	5,000	
September 28	North Texas State Teachers*	Amon G. Carter Stadium; Fort Worth, TX	W 28–11	5,000	
October 5	at Arkansas	The Hill; Fayetteville, AR	W 13–7	3,500	
October 12	at Tulsa*	Skelly Field; Tulsa, OK	W 13–0	9,000	
October 19	Texas A&M	Amon G. Carter Stadium; Fort Worth, TX	W 19–14	15,000	
October 26	at Centenary*	Fairgrounds Stadium; Shreveport, LA	W 27–7	8,000	
November 2	at Baylor	Carroll Field; Waco, TX (rivalry)	W 28–0	12,000	
November 8	at Loyola (LA)*	Loyola University Stadium; New Orleans, LA	W 14–0	6,000	
November 16	at Texas	War Memorial Stadium; Austin, TX (rivalry)	W 28–0		
November 23	Rice	Amon G. Carter Stadium; Fort Worth, TX	W 27–6		
November 30	SMU	Amon G. Carter Stadium; Fort Worth, TX (rivalry)	L 14–20	36,000	
December 7	at Santa Clara*	Kezar Stadium; San Francisco, CA	W 10–6	25,000	
January 1, 1936	vs. LSU*	Tulane Stadium; New Orleans, LA (Sugar Bowl)	W 3–2	35,000	
*Non-conference game

== Roster ==
- Sammy Baugh, QB
- Blackman, HB
- Clark, HB
- Cowan, T
- Melvin Diggs, E
- Dunlap, E
- Drew Ellis, T
- Godwin, T
- Wilson Groseclose, T
- Bob Harrell, HB
- Wilbert Harrison, G
- Clifford Kellow, G
- George Kline, HB
- Jimmy Lawrence, HB
- Darrell Lester, C
- Linne, T
- Tillie Manton, FB
- Mason Mayne, G
- Scott McCall, HB
- Lacy McClanahan, HB
- Bob McClure, HB
- L. D. Meyer, E
- Montgomery, HB
- Needham, E
- Nelson, T
- Peavy, G
- Walt Roach, E
- Roberts, HB
- Rogers, G
- Tittle, C
- Walker, T
- Bill Walls, E
