= 1936 Sugar Bowl =

American college football game

- 2nd Sugar Bowl
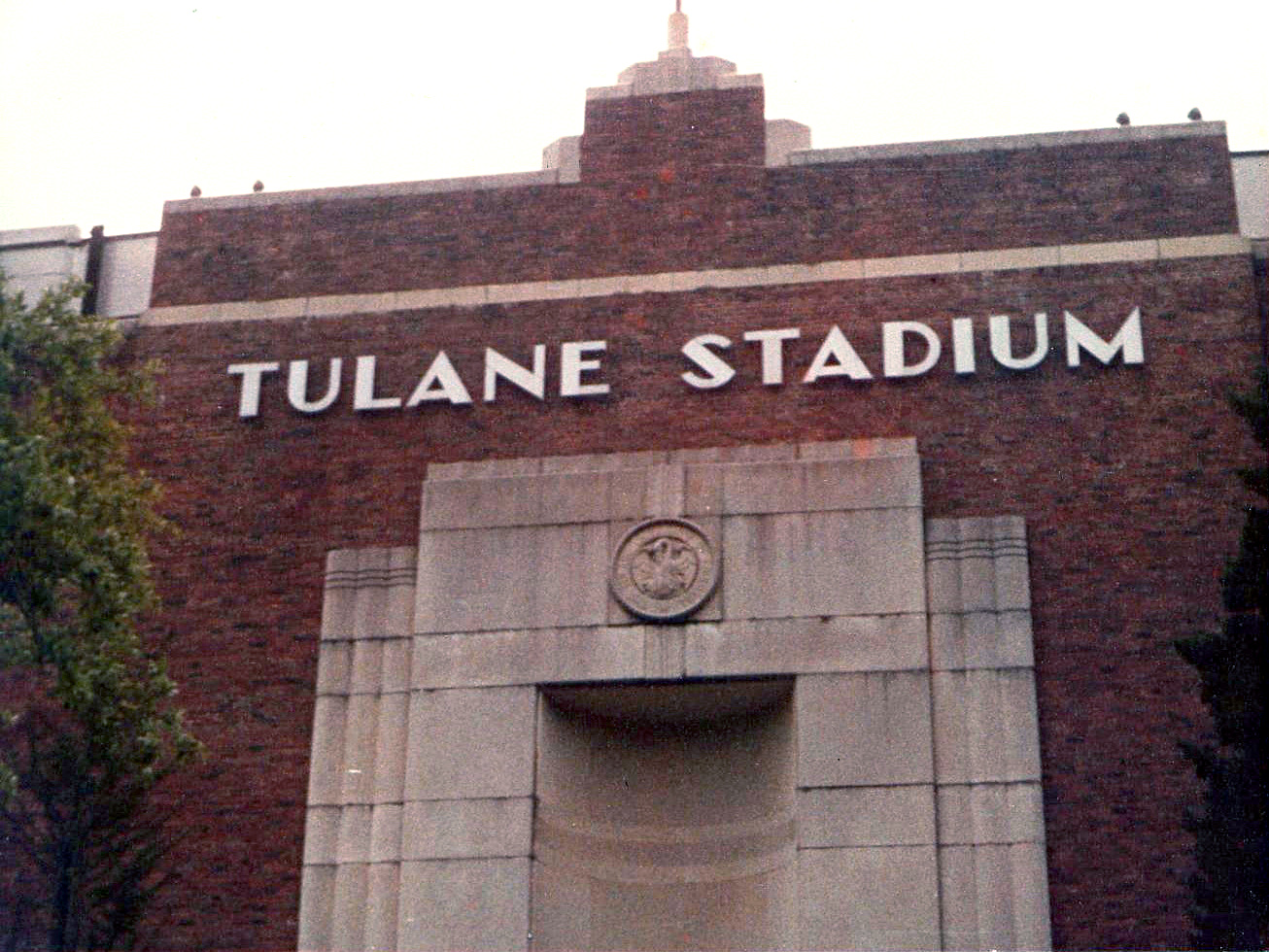
- Tulane Stadium in New Orleans, Louisiana, hosted the Sugar Bowl.
LSU Tigers	TCU Horned Frogs
(9–1)	(11–1)
SEC	SWC
2	3
Head coach: Bernie Moore	Head coach: Dutch Meyer
Coaches 7	Coaches 4
	1	2	3	4	Total
LSU	0	2	0	0	2
TCU	0	3	0	0	3
- Date: January 1, 1936
- Season: 1935
- Stadium: Tulane Stadium
- Location: New Orleans, Louisiana
- Referee: Benny Boynton
- Attendance: 35,000

The 1936 Sugar Bowl, part of the 1935–36 bowl game season, took place on January 1, 1936, at Tulane Stadium in New Orleans, Louisiana. The competing teams were the LSU Tigers, representing the Southeastern Conference (SEC), and the TCU Horned Frogs, representing the Southwest Conference (SWC). TCU won the game, 3–2.

== Teams ==
=== LSU ===
The 1935 LSU squad finished the regular season 9–1 and as SEC champions with loss coming against Rice in the season opener. The Sugar Bowl appearance marked the first ever postseason bowl game for LSU.

=== TCU ===
The 1935 TCU squad finished the regular season with a record of 11–1. The only loss of the season came in their final conference game against SMU by a score of 20–14. The appearance marked the first for TCU in the Sugar bowl and the second all-time bowl appearance.

== Game summary ==
In a game dominated by both defenses, all five points were scored in the second quarter. TCU's Taldon Manton scored first on a 36-yard field goal. LSU scored their only points when Sammy Baugh was called for a safety after being pressured by Gaynell Tinsley, and called for intentional grounding.

Scoring summary

Quarter	Time	Drive			Team	Scoring information	Score	
Quarter	Time	Plays	Yards	TOP	Team	Scoring information	LSU	TCU
2					TCU	36-yard field goal by Taldon Manton	0	3
2					LSU	Sammy Baugh tackled in end zone for a safety by Gaynell Tinsley	2	3
"TOP" = time of possession. For other American football terms, see Glossary of American football.							2	3
