= 1935 Arkansas Razorbacks football team =

American college football season

1935 Arkansas Razorbacks football
- Conference: Southwest Conference
- Record: 5–5 (2–4 SWC)
- Head coach: Fred Thomsen (7th season)
- Captain: Choice Rucker
- Home stadium: The Hill, Quigley Stadium

1935 Southwest Conference football standings
	Conf.					Overall
Team	W		L		T	W		L		T
No. 2 SMU $	6	–	0	–	0	12	–	1	–	0
No. 4 TCU	5	–	1	–	0	12	–	1	–	0
Baylor	3	–	3	–	0	8	–	3	–	0
Rice	3	–	3	–	0	8	–	3	–	0
Arkansas	2	–	4	–	0	5	–	5	–	0
Texas A&M	1	–	5	–	0	3	–	7	–	0
Texas	1	–	5	–	0	4	–	6	–	0
$ – Conference champion; Rankings from United Press

The 1935 Arkansas Razorbacks football team represented the University of Arkansas in the Southwest Conference (SWC) during the 1935 college football season. In their seventh year under head coach Fred Thomsen, the Razorbacks compiled a 5–5 record (2–4 against SWC opponents), finished in fifth place in the SWC, and outscored their opponents by a combined total of 152 to 109.

== Schedule ==
Date	Opponent	Site	Result	Attendance	Source
September 28	Pittsburg Teachers*	The Hill; Fayetteville, AR	W 12–0		
October 5	TCU	The Hill; Fayetteville, AR	L 7–13	3,500	
October 12	at Baylor	Carroll Field; Waco, TX	L 6–13		
October 19	vs. LSU*	State Fair Stadium; Shreveport, LA (rivalry)	L 7–13		
October 26	Ozarks*	The Hill; Fayetteville, AR	W 51–6		
November 2	Texas A&M	Quigley Stadium; Little Rock, AR (rivalry)	W 14–7		
November 9	at Rice	Rice Field; Houston, TX	L 7–20		
November 16	SMU^{†}	The Hill; Fayetteville, AR	L 6–17		
November 22	at Texas	War Memorial Stadium; Austin, TX (rivalry)	W 28–13		
November 28	at Tulsa*	Skelly Field; Tulsa, OK	W 14–7	11,000	
*Non-conference game; ^{†}Homecoming

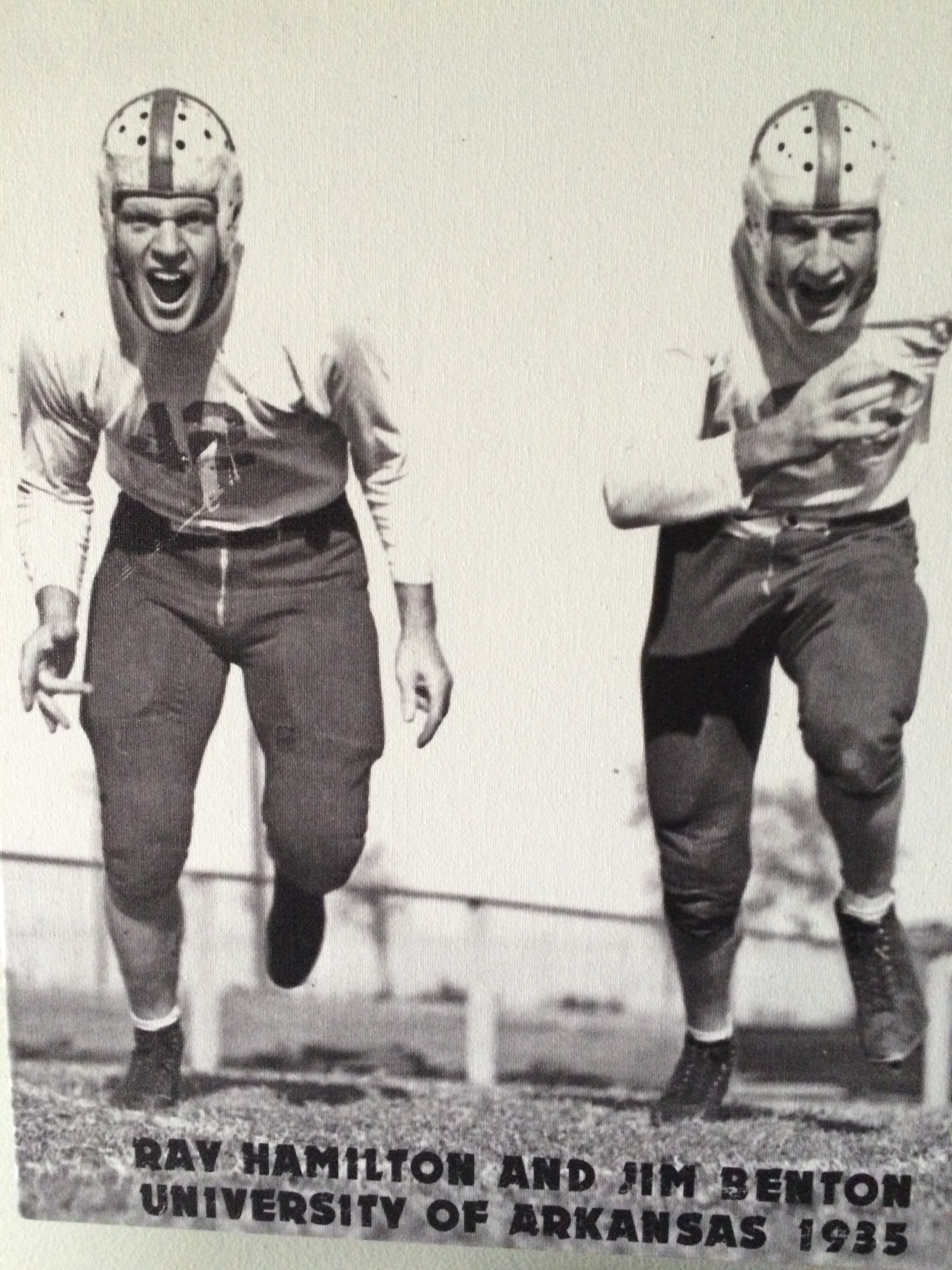
Ray Hamilton and Jim Benton, Arkansas Razorbacks 1935
