= 1935 SMU Mustangs football team =

American college football season

1935 SMU Mustangs football

National champion (Dickinson, Houlgate) SWC champion

Rose Bowl, L 0–7 vs. Stanford
- Conference: Southwest Conference
- Record: 12–1 (6–0 SWC)
- Head coach: Matty Bell (1st season)
- Captains: Harry Shuford; Marco Stewart; J. C. Wetsel
- Home stadium: Ownby Stadium

1935 Southwest Conference football standings
	Conf.					Overall
Team	W		L		T	W		L		T
No. 2 SMU $	6	–	0	–	0	12	–	1	–	0
No. 4 TCU	5	–	1	–	0	12	–	1	–	0
Baylor	3	–	3	–	0	8	–	3	–	0
Rice	3	–	3	–	0	8	–	3	–	0
Arkansas	2	–	4	–	0	5	–	5	–	0
Texas A&M	1	–	5	–	0	3	–	7	–	0
Texas	1	–	5	–	0	4	–	6	–	0
$ – Conference champion; Rankings from United Press

The 1935 SMU Mustangs football team was an American football team that represented Southern Methodist University (SMU) in the Southwest Conference (SWC) during the 1935 college football season. In their first season under head coach Matty Bell, the Mustangs posted an overall record of 12–1 record with a mark of 6–0 in conference play, winning the SWC title. SMU was invited to the Rose Bowl, where they lost to Stanford. The Mustangs shut out eight of thirteen opponents and outscored all opponents by a total of 288 to 39 on the season.

SMU was named as the national champion in 1935 by the Dickinson System and Houlgate System and were awarded national championship trophies by both rankings. They were later retroactively named champions by Berryman and Sagarin as well, and are one of five teams chosen by selectors recognized as "major" by the NCAA.

Two SMU players, halfback Bob Wilson and guard J. C. Wetsel, were selected as a consensus first-team player on the 1935 All-America college football team. In addition, tackle Truman Spain was selected as a first-team All-American by Collier's Weekly and as a second-team All-American by the Associated Press.

== Schedule ==
Date	Opponent	Site	Result	Attendance	Source
September 21	North Texas State Teachers*	Ownby Stadium; University Park, TX (rivalry)	W 39–0	7,000	
September 28	Austin*	Ownby Stadium; University Park, TX	W 60–0		
October 5	at Tulsa*	Skelly Field; Tulsa, OK	W 14–0	10,000–12,000	
October 12	at Washington University*	Francis Field; St. Louis, MO	W 35–6	11,000	
October 19	Rice	Ownby Stadium; University Park, TX (rivalry)	W 10–0	26,000	
October 26	vs. Hardin–Simmons*	Wichita Falls, TX	W 18–6	4,000	
November 2	Texas	Ownby Stadium; University Park, TX	W 20–0	20,000	
November 9	at UCLA*	Memorial Coliseum; Los Angeles, CA	W 21–0	40,000	
November 16	at Arkansas	The Hill; Fayetteville, AR	W 17–6		
November 23	Baylor	Ownby Stadium; University Park, TX	W 10–0	8,000	
November 30	at TCU	Amon G. Carter Stadium; Fort Worth, TX (rivalry)	W 20–14	36,000	
December 7	at Texas A&M	Kyle Field; College Station, TX	W 24–0		
January 1	vs. Stanford*	Rose Bowl; Pasadena, CA (Rose Bowl)	L 0–7	87,000	
*Non-conference game

== Roster ==
- Ackers, E
- Baker, G
- Shelley Burt, HB
- Carroll, E
- Colville, E
- Delafield
- Bob Finley, FB
- Kenneth Goodson
- Gore, QB
- Gray, C
- Guynes, HB
- Johnson, C
- Meyer, HB
- Orr, T
- Phillips, T
- Raborn, C
- Keith Ranspot, E
- Russell, FB
- Sanders, T
- Paschal Scottino, G
- Harry Shuford, FB
- J. R. Smith, FB
- Truman Spain, T
- Johnnie Sprague, QB
- Billy Stamps, G
- Stapp, HB
- Maco Stewart, E
- Stufflebeme, G
- Tipton, E
- Turner, FB
- Weant, T
- J. C. Wetsel, G
- Bob Wilson, HB
