= SMU–TCU football rivalry =

American college football rivalry

TCU–SMU football rivalry

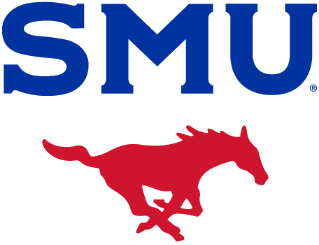
- SMU Mustangs TCU Horned Frogs
- First meeting: October 18, 1915; TCU 43, SMU 0
- Latest meeting: September 20, 2025; TCU 35, SMU 24
- Trophy: Iron Skillet (See below)

Statistics
- Total meetings: 104
- All-time series: TCU leads, 54–43–7
- Largest victory: TCU, 56–0 (2014)
- Longest win streak: SMU, 15 (1972–1986)
- Current win streak: TCU, 1 (2025–present)

Locations of TCU and SMU

The SMU–TCU football rivalry is an American college football rivalry between the TCU Horned Frogs football team of Texas Christian University (TCU) and the SMU Mustangs football team of Southern Methodist University (SMU). The winner of the game receives an iron skillet as a trophy.

== History ==
The teams have played all but seven years since their first meeting in 1915. They did not face each other in 1919, 1920, 1925, 1987, 1988, 2006 or 2020. After a conference change, SMU and TCU agreed to play each season until 2025 on an alternating home-and-away basis.

The 2020 game originally scheduled for September 11 was canceled due to TCU team members testing positive for COVID-19.

Scheduling concerns around the nonconference rivalry led to TCU not renewing the series in the 2020s, with the 2025 matchup becoming the final one for the foreseeable future.

== Iron Skillet ==
There are two different versions of the story. In recent years SMU's website has claimed the following:

TCU and SMU fans began the tradition back in 1946. During pre-game festivities, an SMU fan was frying frog legs as a joke before the game. A TCU fan, seeing this desecration of the "frog", went over and told him that eating the frog legs was going well beyond the rivalry and that they should let the game decide who would get the skillet and the frog legs. SMU won the game, and the skillet and frog legs went to SMU. The tradition eventually spilled over into the actual game and the Iron Skillet is now passed to the winner.

An article from TCU magazine tells the following story:

"The first "Battle for the Iron Skillet" occurred on November 30, 1946, as college football boomed after World War II. Weeks prior to the game, SMU’s Student Council proposed the idea of presenting a trophy to the winning team. TCU accepted the idea, and the two schools' governing bodies met in Dallas to set up the rules of the traveling trophy, which became the Iron Skillet." The TCU magazine article has this to say about the other story "One mystery remains: Why a skillet? History books provide scant details. Some claim that an SMU fan in the 1950s was caught frying frogs legs in a skillet at a tailgate before the game, and a TCU fan wagered that the winner should take the pan home, but that conflicts with a published report of the skillet originating with the councils."

== Notable games ==
=== 1935: For the Rose Bowl ===
TCU and SMU again met to decide not only the SWC title but the first trip to the Rose Bowl for a team from the SWC. Grantland Rice of the New York Sun called it the "Game of the Century" and reported the following:

In a TCU Stadium that seated 30,000 spectators, over 36,000 wildly excited Texans and visitors from every corner of the map packed, jammed, and fought their way into every square foot of standing and seating space to see one of the greatest football games ever played…this tense, keyed up crowd even leaped the wire fences from the top of automobiles…"

SMU scored the first 14 points. TCU, led by All-American quarterback Sammy Baugh, tied the game at the beginning of the fourth quarter. Then, with seven minutes left in the game SMU, on 4th and 4 on the Frogs' 37 yard-line, lined up to punt. Quarterback Bob Finley threw a 50-yard pass to running back Bobby Wilson who made what is described as a "jumping, twisting catch that swept him over the line for the touchdown."

== Game results ==
SMU victories	TCU victories	Tie games

No.	Date	Location	Winning team		Losing team	
1	October 9, 1915	TCU campus	TCU	43	SMU	0
2	October 18, 1916	State Fair grounds (Dallas)	TCU	48	SMU	3
3	October 20, 1917	TCU gridiron	TCU	21	SMU	0
4	October 12, 1918†	Armstrong Field	SMU	1	TCU	0
5	November 11, 1921	Fair Park Stadium	TCU	13	SMU	6
6	December 9, 1922	Panther Park	Tie	0	Tie	0
7	November 3, 1923	Fair Park Stadium	SMU	40	TCU	0
8	November 1, 1924	Clark Field	SMU	6	TCU	0
9	November 25, 1926	Ownby Stadium	SMU	14	TCU	13
10	November 24, 1927	Clark Field	SMU	28	TCU	6
11	November 29, 1928	Ownby Stadium	TCU	15	SMU	6
12	November 30, 1929	Clark Field	Tie	7	Tie	7
13	November 29, 1930	Ownby Stadium	TCU	13	SMU	0
14	November 28, 1931	Amon G. Carter Stadium	Tie	0	Tie	0
15	November 26, 1932	Ownby Stadium	TCU	8	SMU	0
16	December 2, 1933	Amon G. Carter Stadium	TCU	26	SMU	6
17	December 1, 1934	Ownby Stadium	SMU	19	TCU	0
18	November 30, 1935	Amon G. Carter Stadium	SMU	20	TCU	14
19	November 28, 1936	Ownby Stadium	Tie	0	Tie	0
20	November 27, 1937	Amon G. Carter Stadium	#14 TCU	3	SMU	0
21	November 26, 1938	Ownby Stadium	#2 TCU	20	SMU	7
22	December 2, 1939	Amon G. Carter Stadium	SMU	14	TCU	7
23	November 30, 1940	Ownby Stadium	#16 SMU	16	TCU	0
24	November 29, 1941	Amon G. Carter Stadium	TCU	15	SMU	13
25	November 28, 1942	Ownby Stadium	TCU	14	SMU	6
26	November 27, 1943	Amon G. Carter Stadium	SMU	20	TCU	0
27	December 2, 1944	Ownby Stadium	SMU	9	TCU	6
28	December 1, 1945	Amon G. Carter Stadium	SMU	34	TCU	0
29	November 30, 1946	Ownby Stadium	#3 SMU	30	TCU	13
30	November 29, 1947	Amon G. Carter Stadium	Tie	19	Tie	19
31	November 27, 1948	Cotton Bowl	Tie	7	Tie	7
32	November 26, 1949	Amon G. Carter Stadium	TCU	26	SMU	13
33	December 2, 1950	Cotton Bowl	TCU	27	SMU	13
34	December 1, 1951	Amon G. Carter Stadium	#11 TCU	13	SMU	2
35	November 29, 1952	Cotton Bowl	TCU	14	SMU	7
36	November 28, 1953	Amon G. Carter Stadium	TCU	13	SMU	0
37	November 27, 1954	Cotton Bowl	SMU	21	TCU	6
38	November 26, 1955	Amon G. Carter Stadium	#7 TCU	20	SMU	13
39	December 1, 1956	Cotton Bowl	#14 TCU	21	SMU	6
40	November 30, 1957	Amon G. Carter Stadium	TCU	21	SMU	0
41	November 29, 1958	Cotton Bowl	SMU	20	#7 TCU	13
42	November 28, 1959	Amon G. Carter Stadium	#8 TCU	19	SMU	0
43	November 26, 1960	Cotton Bowl	TCU	13	SMU	0
44	December 2, 1961	Amon G. Carter Stadium	Tie	28	Tie	28
45	December 1, 1962	Cotton Bowl	TCU	14	SMU	9
46	November 23, 1963	Amon G. Carter Stadium	TCU	22	SMU	15
47	November 28, 1964	Cotton Bowl	TCU	17	SMU	6
48	November 27, 1965	Cotton Bowl	TCU	10	SMU	7
49	November 26, 1966	Cotton Bowl	SMU	21	TCU	0
50	December 2, 1967	Cotton Bowl	SMU	28	TCU	14
51	October 12, 1968	Amon G. Carter Stadium	SMU	21	TCU	14
52	October 10, 1969	Cotton Bowl	SMU	19	TCU	17
53	November 28, 1970	Amon G. Carter Stadium	TCU	26	SMU	17

No.	Date	Location	Winning team		Losing team	
54	November 27, 1971	Cotton Bowl	TCU	18	SMU	16
55	December 2, 1972	Amon G. Carter Stadium	SMU	35	TCU	22
56	December 1, 1973	Cotton Bowl	SMU	21	TCU	19
57	October 12, 1974	Amon G. Carter Stadium	SMU	33	TCU	13
58	October 10, 1975	Cotton Bowl	SMU	28	TCU	13
59	September 11, 1976	Cotton Bowl	SMU	34	TCU	14
60	September 10, 1977	Amon G. Carter Stadium	SMU	45	TCU	21
61	September 9, 1978	Cotton Bowl	SMU	45	TCU	14
62	September 15, 1979	Amon G. Carter Stadium	#20 SMU	27	TCU	7
63	September 20, 1980	Texas Stadium	SMU	17	TCU	14
64	September 26, 1981	Amon G. Carter Stadium	#20 SMU	20	TCU	9
65	September 25, 1982	Texas Stadium	#6 SMU	16	TCU	13
66	September 24, 1983	Amon G. Carter Stadium	#18 SMU	21	TCU	17
67	September 29, 1984	Texas Stadium	#11 SMU	26	TCU	17
68	September 28, 1985	Amon G. Carter Stadium	#6 SMU	56	TCU	21
69	September 27, 1986	Cotton Bowl	SMU	31	TCU	21
70	September 30, 1989	Amon G. Carter Stadium	TCU	28	SMU	10
71	September 29, 1990	Ownby Stadium	TCU	42	SMU	21
72	November 2, 1991	Amon G. Carter Stadium	TCU	18	SMU	10
73	October 17, 1992	Ownby Stadium	SMU	27	TCU	17
74	September 25, 1993	Amon G. Carter Stadium	SMU	21	TCU	15
75	November 12, 1994	Ownby Stadium	TCU	35	SMU	14
76	November 4, 1995	Amon G. Carter Stadium	TCU	19	SMU	16
77	November 21, 1996	Cotton Bowl	SMU	27	TCU	24
78	November 20, 1997	Amon G. Carter Stadium	TCU	21	SMU	18
79	October 17, 1998	Cotton Bowl	SMU	10	TCU	6
80	November 26, 1999	Amon G. Carter Stadium	TCU	21	SMU	0
81	November 24, 2000	Gerald J. Ford Stadium	#13 TCU	62	SMU	7
82	September 8, 2001	Gerald J. Ford Stadium	TCU	38	SMU	10
83	September 14, 2002	Amon G. Carter Stadium	TCU	17	SMU	6
84	November 29, 2003	Gerald J. Ford Stadium	#19 TCU	20	SMU	13
85	September 11, 2004	Amon G. Carter Stadium	TCU	44	SMU	0
86	September 10, 2005	Gerald J. Ford Stadium	SMU	21	#22 TCU	10
87	September 22, 2007	Amon G. Carter Stadium	TCU	21	SMU	7
88	September 20, 2008	Gerald J. Ford Stadium	TCU	48	SMU	7
89	October 3, 2009	Amon G. Carter Stadium	#11 TCU	39	SMU	14
90	September 24, 2010	Gerald J. Ford Stadium	#4 TCU	41	SMU	24
91	October 1, 2011	Amon G. Carter Stadium	SMU	40	#20 TCU	33^{OT}
92	September 30, 2012	Gerald J. Ford Stadium	#15 TCU	24	SMU	16
93	September 28, 2013	Amon G. Carter Stadium	TCU	48	SMU	17
94	September 27, 2014	Gerald J. Ford Stadium	TCU	56	SMU	0
95	September 19, 2015	Amon G. Carter Stadium	#3 TCU	56	SMU	37
96	September 23, 2016	Gerald J. Ford Stadium	TCU	33	SMU	3
97	September 16, 2017	Amon G. Carter Stadium	#20 TCU	56	SMU	36
98	September 7, 2018	Gerald J. Ford Stadium	#16 TCU	42	SMU	12
99	September 21, 2019	Amon G. Carter Stadium	SMU	41	#25 TCU	38
100	September 25, 2021	Amon G. Carter Stadium	SMU	42	TCU	34
101	September 24, 2022	Gerald J. Ford Stadium	TCU	42	SMU	34
102	September 23, 2023	Amon G. Carter Stadium	TCU	34	SMU	17
103	September 21, 2024	Gerald J. Ford Stadium	SMU	66	TCU	42
104	September 20, 2025	Amon G. Carter Stadium	TCU	35	SMU	24
Series: TCU leads 54–43–7
† TCU forfeited the 1918 game

=== Results by location ===
As of September 20, 2025

City	Stadium	Games	TCU victories	SMU victories	Ties
Ft. Worth	Amon G. Carter Stadium	44	25	16	3
Ft. Worth	Panther Park	1	0	0	1
Ft. Worth	TCU gridiron	1	1	0	0
Ft. Worth	TCU campus	1	1	0	0
Ft. Worth	Total	47	27	16	4
Dallas	Cotton Bowl	21	8	12	1
Dallas	Gerald J. Ford Stadium	12	10	2	0
Dallas	Ownby Stadium	14	7	6	1
Dallas	Clark Field	3	0	2	1
Dallas	Fair Park Stadium	2	1	1	0
Dallas	Armstrong Field	1	0	1	0
Dallas	State Fair Grounds (Dallas)	1	1	0	0
Dallas	Total	54	27	24	3
Irving	Texas Stadium	3	0	3	0
Irving	Total	3	0	3	0
Series total		104	54	43	7

== See also ==
- List of NCAA college football rivalry games
- List of most-played college football series in NCAA Division I
