= Matty Bell =

American football player (1899-1983)

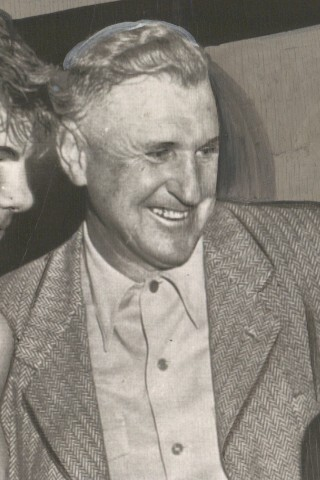
- Bell in 1949

Biographical details
- Born: February 22, 1899; Fort Worth, Texas, U.S.
- Died: June 30, 1983 (aged 84); Dallas, Texas, U.S.

Playing career

Football
- 1916–1919: Centre
- Position: End

Coaching career (HC unless noted)

Football
- 1920–1921: Haskell
- 1922: Carroll (WI)
- 1923–1928: TCU
- 1929–1933: Texas A&M
- 1935–1941: SMU
- 1945–1949: SMU

Basketball
- 1923–1929: TCU

Administrative career (AD unless noted)
- 1947–1964: SMU

Head coaching record
- Overall: 153–88–17 (football); 71–41 (basketball)

Accomplishments and honors

Championships
- Football; 1 National (1935); 4 SWC (1935, 1940, 1947–1948)
- College Football Hall of Fame; Inducted in 1955 (profile)

William Madison "Matty" Bell (February 22, 1899 – June 30, 1983) was an American football player, coach of football and basketball, and college athletics administrator. He played for Centre, captain of its 1918 team. He served as the head football coach at the Haskell Institute (1920–1921), Carroll College in Waukesha, Wisconsin (1922), Texas Christian University (1923–1928), Texas A&M University (1929–1933), and Southern Methodist University (1935–1941, 1945–1949), compiling a career college football record of 147–88–17. His 1935 SMU Mustangs, which have been recognized as a national champion, went 12–0 in the regular season before losing to Stanford in the Rose Bowl. Bell was also the head basketball coach at Texas Christian for six seasons from 1923 to 1929, tallying a mark of 71–41. He was inducted into the College Football Hall of Fame as a coach in 1955. After retiring from coaching following the 1949 season, Bell served as the athletic director at Southern Methodist until 1964. He died in 1983 in Dallas.

== Navy service ==
During World War II, Bell took a leave of absence from coaching to serve in the aviation branch of the United States Naval Reserve from 1942 to 1945. On June 12, 1942, he was sworn in as a lieutenant commander, and reported to Annapolis. Subsequently, he became the athletic director at the Navy Pre-Flight School on the campus of the University of Georgia and rose to the rank of commander. After the war, he returned to SMU as head coach.

== Head coaching record ==
=== Football ===
Year	Team	Overall	Conference	Standing	Bowl/playoffs	AP^{#}
Haskell Indians (Independent) (1920–1921)
1920	Haskell	7–2–1				
1921	Haskell	5–4				
Haskell:		14–6–1				
Carroll Pioneers (Independent) (1922)
1922	Carroll	3–4				
Carroll:		3–4				
TCU Horned Frogs (Southwest Conference) (1923–1928)
1923	TCU	4–5	2–1	3rd		
1924	TCU	4–5	1–5	8th		
1925	TCU	7–1–1	2–0–1	2nd		
1926	TCU	6–1–2	1–1–2	T–3rd		
1927	TCU	4–3–2	1–2–2	5th		
1928	TCU	8–2	3–2	T–3rd		
TCU:		33–17–5	10–11–5			
Texas A&M Aggies (Southwest Conference) (1929–1933)
1929	Texas A&M	5–4	2–3	5th		
1930	Texas A&M	2–7	0–5	7th		
1931	Texas A&M	7–3	3–2	3rd		
1932	Texas A&M	4–4–2	1–2–2	4th		
1933	Texas A&M	6–3–1	2–2–1	4th		
Texas A&M:		24–21–3	8–14–3			
SMU Mustangs (Southwest Conference) (1935–1941)
1935	SMU	12–1	6–0	1st	L Rose	
1936	SMU	5–4–1	2–3–1	5th		
1937	SMU	5–6	2–4	6th		
1938	SMU	6–4	4–2	2nd		
1939	SMU	6–3–1	4–2	T–2nd		
1940	SMU	8–1–1	5–1	T–1st		16
1941	SMU	5–5	2–4	5th		
SMU Mustangs (Southwest Conference) (1945–1949)
1945	SMU	5–6	4–2	2nd		
1946	SMU	4–5–1	2–4	T–5th		
1947	SMU	9–0–2	5–0–1	1st	T Cotton	3
1948	SMU	9–1–1	5–0–1	1st	W Cotton	10
1949	SMU	5–4–1	2–3–1	5th		
SMU:		79–40–8	43–25–4			
Total:		153–88–17				
National championship Conference title Conference division title or championship game berth
^{#}Rankings from final AP Poll.
