= Truman Spain =

American football player (1913–1968)

Profile
- Position: Tackle

Personal information
- Born: January 10, 1913
- Died: February 12, 1968 (aged 55); McLean, Texas, U.S.

Career information
- High school: Breckenridge High School
- College: Southern Methodist University
- NFL draft: 1936: 4th round, 30th overall pick

Awards and highlights
- Consensus All-American (1935); First-team All-SWC (1935)

Truman Foy "Big Dog" Spain (January 10, 1913 – February 12, 1968) was an American football tackle.

He played college football at Southern Methodist University and was a member of the undefeated 1935 SMU team that was recognized as the national champion. At the end of the 1935 season, Spain was selected by Grantland Rice for Collier's Weekly and by a board of coaches for Pathé News as a first-team player on the 1935 All-America college football team. He was also selected as a second-team All-American by the Associated Press.

When the 1935 SMU team was invited to play in the 1936 Rose Bowl, Spain received coverage for his good looks. One syndicated feature article compared Spain to Clark Gable under the headline: "If Movie Colony Grabs Off One Of Mustangs, It Likely Will Be Clark Gable Spain." The article noted that Spain was "all man" and reported on the reaction of women to his "rumba king" good looks: "This Spain fellow, young ladies, is definitely of the Latin type except that instead of being sleek he is as hard as ship's steel and as torrid as a foundry furnace. . . . No mere man could use the correct expression, but a co-ed said: 'His large, black eyes burn into you and make you feel that something is going to happen.'" In late January 1936, the publicity drew an offer for Spain to enter the boxing game, which he turned down. Spain said he was due a movie tryout, and "a bunged-up face wouldn't be any help in Hollywood, unless Truman wanted a gangster role." He was drafted in the fourth round of the 1936 NFL Draft with the 30th overall pick.

After retiring from football, Spain worked as an oil drilling contractor in Ardmore, Oklahoma. He died in 1968 of an apparent heart attack at age 55.
