= 1935 Texas A&M Aggies football team =

American college football season

1935 Texas A&M Aggies football
- Conference: Southwest Conference
- Record: 3–7 (1–5 SWC)
- Head coach: Homer Norton (2nd season)
- Home stadium: Kyle Field

1935 Southwest Conference football standings
	Conf.					Overall
Team	W		L		T	W		L		T
No. 2 SMU $	6	–	0	–	0	12	–	1	–	0
No. 4 TCU	5	–	1	–	0	12	–	1	–	0
Baylor	3	–	3	–	0	8	–	3	–	0
Rice	3	–	3	–	0	8	–	3	–	0
Arkansas	2	–	4	–	0	5	–	5	–	0
Texas A&M	1	–	5	–	0	3	–	7	–	0
Texas	1	–	5	–	0	4	–	6	–	0
$ – Conference champion; Rankings from United Press

The 1935 Texas A&M Aggies football team represented the Agricultural and Mechanical College of Texas—now known as Texas A&M University—in the Southwest Conference (SWC) during the 1935 college football season. In its second season under head coach Homer Norton, the team compiled an overall record of 3–7, with a mark of 1–5 in conference play, and finished sixth in the SWC.

== Schedule ==
Date	Opponent	Site	Result	Attendance	Source
September 21	Stephen F. Austin*	Kyle Field; College Station, TX	W 37–6	4,000	
September 27	at Sam Houston State*	Pritchett Field; Huntsville, TX	W 25–0	4,000	
October 5	vs. Temple*	Lion Stadium; Tyler, TX	L 0–14	14,000	
October 12	at Centenary*	Centenary Field; Shreveport, LA	L 6–7		
October 19	at TCU	Amon G. Carter Stadium; Fort Worth, TX (rivalry)	L 14–19	15,000	
October 26	Baylor	Kyle Field; College Station, TX (rivalry)	L 6–14		
November 2	at Arkansas	Quigley Stadium; Little Rock, AR (rivalry)	L 7–14		
November 16	at Rice	Rice Field; Houston, TX	L 10–17		
November 28	Texas	Kyle Field; College Station, TX (rivalry)	W 20–6		
December 7	SMU	Kyle Field; College Station, TX	L 0–24		
*Non-conference game
