= TCU Horned Frog Marching Band =

Marching band at Texas Christian University

The TCU Horned Frog Marching Band
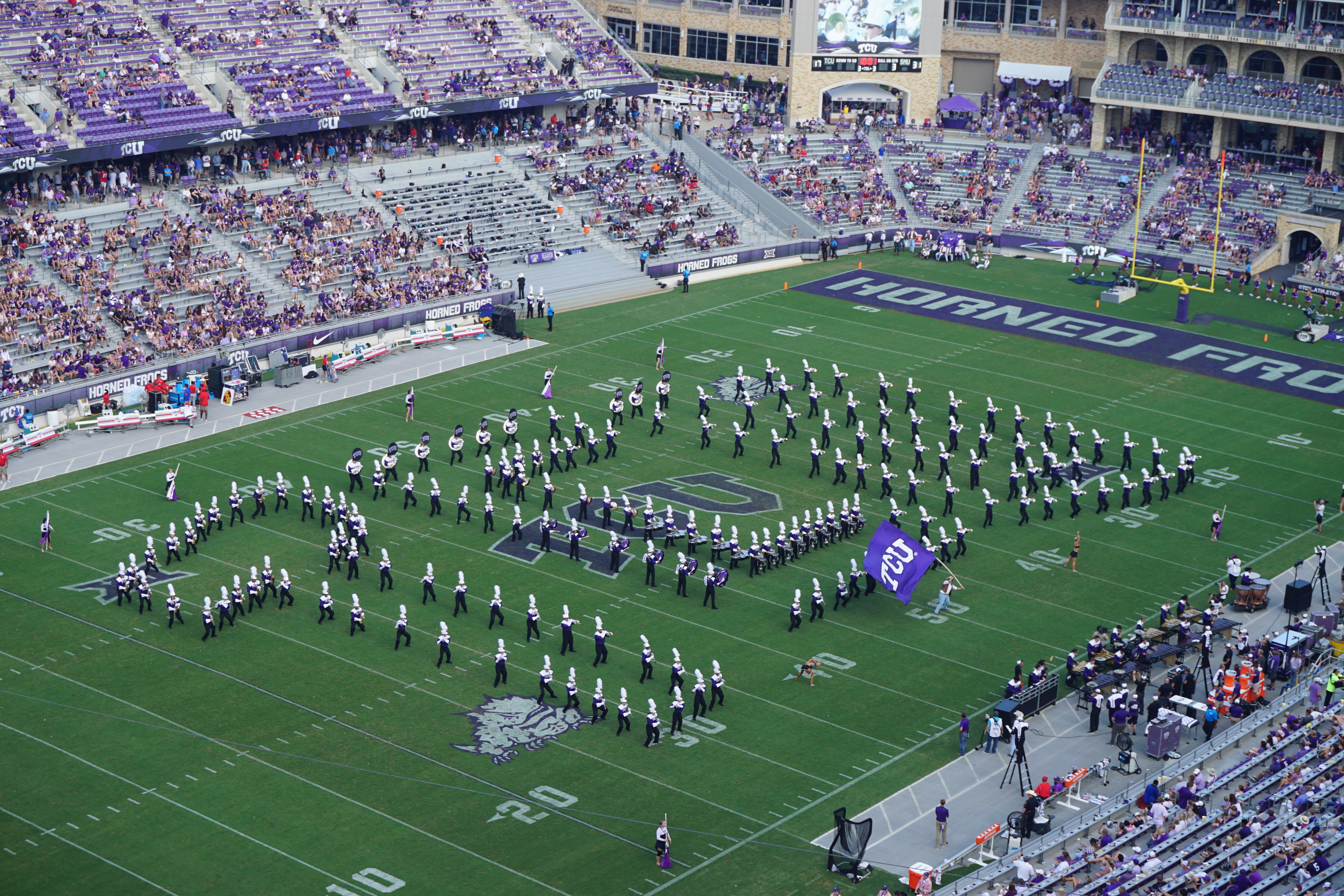
- School: Texas Christian University
- Location: Fort Worth, TX
- Conference: Big 12
- Founded: 1904
- Director: Dr. Drew Dickey
- Members: 245 in the 2017 season
- Fight song: "TCU March"
- Website: www.band.tcu.edu

The TCU Horned Frog Marching Band is the official marching band of Texas Christian University.

Until their move to the Big 12 in 2012, TCU's band stood out amongst other college marching bands in that it performed in an explicitly corps style, usually reserved for Drum and Bugle Corps and high school marching bands. Although the band has roots in military marching, the band made a change in direction in the 1980s, capitalizing on the popularity of the increasingly popular Drum Corps International (DCI) competitions.

Not conforming to fans' expectations has caused the band to be openly criticized by some. On the other hand, TCU's marching band was named one of the top five college marching bands in the United States by the College Band Directors National Association.

== History ==
The earliest incarnation of the TCU Horned Frog Marching band was the Texas Christian University Military Band, established in 1904 by Charles V. Kirkpatrick. The campus fire of 1910, which led to the university's relocation to Fort Worth, TX, slowed the growth of the band until J. E. King revived it in 1921 by introducing regular rehearsals and performances.

The band came into its own in the 1930s and 1940s under the direction of Claude Sammis, thanks to the innovative arrangements of popular music by assistant director Don Gillis. These arrangements were so popular that at a game at Madison Square Garden, the band allegedly held the attention of the football crowd for over an hour after the game.

A pivotal figure in the history of the band is James A. Jacobsen, director from 1955 to 1981. Most notably, Jacobsen introduced the "moving diamond" (or step-two) drill move, which was featured on television in 1958 and became a staple of marching band repertoire. After Jacobsen left in 1981, he was succeeded by Curtis Wilson, who began the band's transition to corps style marching.
