= 1935 Texas Longhorns football team =

American college football season

1935 Texas Longhorns football
- Conference: Southwest Conference
- Record: 4–6 (1–5 SWC)
- Head coach: Jack Chevigny (2nd season)
- Captain: Joe Smartt
- Home stadium: War Memorial Stadium

1935 Southwest Conference football standings
	Conf.					Overall
Team	W		L		T	W		L		T
No. 2 SMU $	6	–	0	–	0	12	–	1	–	0
No. 4 TCU	5	–	1	–	0	12	–	1	–	0
Baylor	3	–	3	–	0	8	–	3	–	0
Rice	3	–	3	–	0	8	–	3	–	0
Arkansas	2	–	4	–	0	5	–	5	–	0
Texas A&M	1	–	5	–	0	3	–	7	–	0
Texas	1	–	5	–	0	4	–	6	–	0
$ – Conference champion; Rankings from United Press

The 1935 Texas Longhorns football team was an American football team that represented the University of Texas (now known as the University of Texas at Austin) as a member of the Southwest Conference (SWC) during the 1935 college football season. In their second year under head coach Jack Chevigny, the Longhorns compiled an overall record of 4–6, with a mark of 1–5 in conference play, and finished tied for sixth in the SWC.

== Schedule ==
Date	Opponent	Site	Result	Attendance	Source
September 28	Texas A&I*	War Memorial Stadium; Austin, TX	W 38–6	6,000	
October 5	at LSU*	Tiger Stadium; Baton Rouge, LA	L 6–18		
October 12	vs. Oklahoma*	Fair Park Stadium; Dallas, TX (rivalry)	W 12–7	16,000	
October 19	Centenary*	War Memorial Stadium; Austin, TX	W 19–13		
October 26	Rice	War Memorial Stadium; Austin, TX (rivalry)	L 19–28	30,000	
November 2	at SMU	Ownby Stadium; University Park, TX	L 0–20	20,000	
November 9	at Baylor	Carroll Field; Waco, TX (rivalry)	W 25–6	5,000	
November 16	TCU	War Memorial Stadium; Austin, TX (rivalry)	L 0–28		
November 22	Arkansas	War Memorial Stadium; Austin, TX (rivalry)	L 13–28		
November 28	at Texas A&M	Kyle Field; College Station, TX (rivalry)	L 6–20		
*Non-conference game
