= 1935 Baylor Bears football team =

American college football season

1935 Baylor Bears football
- Conference: Southwest Conference
- Record: 8–3 (3–3 SWC)
- Head coach: Morley Jennings (10th season)
- Captain: Wendell W. Simpson
- Home stadium: Carroll Field

1935 Southwest Conference football standings
	Conf.					Overall
Team	W		L		T	W		L		T
No. 2 SMU $	6	–	0	–	0	12	–	1	–	0
No. 4 TCU	5	–	1	–	0	12	–	1	–	0
Baylor	3	–	3	–	0	8	–	3	–	0
Rice	3	–	3	–	0	8	–	3	–	0
Arkansas	2	–	4	–	0	5	–	5	–	0
Texas A&M	1	–	5	–	0	3	–	7	–	0
Texas	1	–	5	–	0	4	–	6	–	0
$ – Conference champion; Rankings from United Press

The 1935 Baylor Bears football team represented Baylor University in the Southwest Conference (SWC) during the 1935 college football season. In their 10th season under head coach Morley Jennings, the Bears compiled an 8–3 record (3–3 against conference opponents), tied for third place in the conference, and outscored opponents by a combined total of 122 to 75. They played their home games at Carroll Field in Waco, Texas. Wendell W. Simpson was the team captain.

== Schedule ==
Date	Opponent	Site	Result	Attendance	Source
September 21	Southwestern (TX)*	Carroll Field; Waco, TX	W 39–0		
September 28	Hardin–Simmons*	Carroll Field; Waco, TX	W 14–0		
October 5	Texas A&I*	Carroll Field; Waco, TX	W 6–0		
October 12	Arkansas	Carroll Field; Waco, TX	W 13–6		
October 18	at Oklahoma City*	Goldbug Field; Oklahoma City, OK	W 2–0	7,500	
October 26	at Texas A&M	Kyle Field; College Station, TX (rivalry)	W 14–6		
November 2	TCU^{†}	Carroll Field; Waco, TX (rivalry)	L 0–28	12,000	
November 9	Texas	Carroll Field; Waco, TX (rivalry)	L 6–25	5,000	
November 16	at Centenary*	Centenary Field; Shreveport, LA	W 20–0	5,500	
November 23	at SMU	Ownby Stadium; University Park, TX	L 0–10	8,000	
November 30	at Rice	Rice Field; Houston, TX	W 8–0		
*Non-conference game; ^{†}Homecoming
