= 1935 Rice Owls football team =

American college football season

1935 Rice Owls football
- Conference: Southwest Conference
- Record: 8–3 (3–3 SWC)
- Head coach: Jimmy Kitts (2nd season)
- Home stadium: Rice Field

1935 Southwest Conference football standings
	Conf.					Overall
Team	W		L		T	W		L		T
No. 2 SMU $	6	–	0	–	0	12	–	1	–	0
No. 4 TCU	5	–	1	–	0	12	–	1	–	0
Baylor	3	–	3	–	0	8	–	3	–	0
Rice	3	–	3	–	0	8	–	3	–	0
Arkansas	2	–	4	–	0	5	–	5	–	0
Texas A&M	1	–	5	–	0	3	–	7	–	0
Texas	1	–	5	–	0	4	–	6	–	0
$ – Conference champion; Rankings from United Press

The 1935 Rice Owls football team was an American football team that represented Rice Institute as a member of the Southwest Conference (SWC) during the 1935 college football season. In its second season under head coach Jimmy Kitts, the team compiled an 8–3 record (3–3 against SWC opponents) and outscored opponents by a total of 201 to 101.

== Schedule ==
Date	Opponent	Site	Result	Attendance	Source
September 21	at St. Mary's (TX)*	Eagle Field; San Antonio, TX	W 38–0		
September 28	at LSU*	Tiger Stadium; Baton Rouge, LA	W 10–7	22,000	
October 5	Duquesne*	Rice Field; Houston, TX	W 27–7	11,000	
October 12	Creighton*	Rice Field; Houston, TX	W 14–0	10,000	
October 19	at SMU	Ownby Stadium; University Park, TX (rivalry)	L 0–10	26,000	
October 26	at Texas	War Memorial Stadium; Austin, TX (rivalry)	W 28–19	30,000	
November 2	at George Washington*	Griffith Stadium; Washington, D.C.	W 41–6	15,000	
November 9	Arkansas	Rice Field; Houston, TX	W 20–7		
November 16	Texas A&M	Rice Field; Houston, TX	W 17–10		
November 23	at TCU	Amon G. Carter Stadium; Fort Worth, TX	L 6–27		
November 30	Baylor	Rice Field; Houston, TX	L 0–8		
*Non-conference game
