= Bob Wilson (American football) =

American football player (1913–1999)

No. 11, 10
- Position: Halfback

Personal information
- Born: August 16, 1913; Nacogdoches, Texas, U.S.
- Died: May 15, 1999 (aged 85); Brenham, Texas, U.S.
- Listed height: 5 ft 9 in (1.75 m)
- Listed weight: 147 lb (67 kg)

Career information
- High school: Corsicana (TX)
- College: SMU
- NFL draft: 1936: 5th round, 40th overall pick

Career history
- Brooklyn Dodgers (1936)

Awards and highlights
- National champion (1935); Consensus All-American (1935); First-team All-SWC (1935)

Career NFL statistics
- Rushing yards: 505
- Average: 4.9
- Touchdowns: 3
- Stats at Pro Football Reference
- College Football Hall of Fame

Robert Edward Wilson Jr. (August 16, 1913 – May 15, 1999) was an American professional football player. He attended Southern Methodist University (SMU), where he played halfback for the SMU Mustangs football team from 1933 to 1935. He was recognized as a consensus first-team All-American following his 1935 senior season. Wilson was chosen by the National Football League (NFL)'s Brooklyn Dodgers in fifth round (40th pick overall) in the 1936 NFL draft, and played a single season for the Dodgers in 1936. Wilson was inducted into the College Football Hall of Fame in 1973, and died in 1999.
