= 1935 All-Pacific Coast football team =

American all-star college football team

1935 Pacific Coast Conference football standings
	Conf.					Overall
Team	W		L		T	W		L		T
No. 6 Stanford ^ +	4	–	1	–	0	8	–	1	–	0
No. 9 California +	4	–	1	–	0	9	–	1	–	0
No. 18 UCLA +	4	–	1	–	0	8	–	2	–	0
Washington State	3	–	2	–	0	5	–	3	–	1
Oregon	3	–	2	–	0	6	–	3	–	0
No. 23 Washington	4	–	3	–	0	5	–	3	–	0
Oregon State	2	–	3	–	1	6	–	4	–	1
USC	2	–	4	–	0	5	–	7	–	0
Idaho	1	–	5	–	0	2	–	7	–	0
Montana	0	–	5	–	1	1	–	5	–	2
+ – Conference co-champions; ^ – Selected as Rose Bowl representative; Rankings from United Press

The 1935 All-Pacific Coast football team consists of American football players chosen by various organizations for All-Pacific Coast teams for the 1935 college football season. The organizations and individuals selecting teams in 1935 included the Associated Press (AP), USC head coach Howard Jones (HJ), the Newspaper Enterprise Association (NEA), The Oregon Statesman (OS), the United Press (UP), and UCLA coach William H. Spaulding (WS).

Stanford and California tied for the Pacific Coast Conference (PCC) championship. Each placed five players on the first teams chosen by one or more of the selectors. Stanford's honorees included fullback Bobby Grayson, end Monk Moscrip, and tackle Bob Reynolds. California's honorees included tackle Larry Lutz, end Jack Brittingham, and center Bob Herwig.

Four players from teams outside the PCC received first-team honors from at least one selector: guard Nick Bassi of Santa Clara Broncos (HJ, UP), halfback John Oravec of the Willamette Bearcats (OS), guard Marty Kordick of St. Mary's (WS), and center Wagner Jorgensen of St. Mary's (HJ).

== All-Pacific Coast selections ==
=== Quarterback ===
- Ed Goddard, Washington State (AP-1; HJ-1; NEA-1; OS-1; UP-1; WS-1)
- Elmer Logg, Washington (UP-2)

=== Halfbacks ===
- Charles "Chuck" Cheshire, UCLA (AP-1; HJ-1; NEA-1; OS-1; UP-1; WS-1)
- Byron Haines, Washington (AP-1; HJ-1; NEA-1; UP-1; WS-1)
- John Oravec, Willamette (OS-1)
- Floyd Blower, California (UP-2)
- David Davis, USC (UP-2; AP-2)
- Joe Gray, Oregon State (AP-2)
- Bob "Bones" Hamilton, Stanford (AP-2)

=== Fullback ===
- Bobby Grayson, Stanford (AP-1; HJ-1; NEA_1; OS-1; UP-1; WS-1)
- Ed Nowogroski, Washington (AP-2)
- Frank Michek, Oregon (UP-2)

=== Ends ===
- Jack Brittingham, California (AP-1; HJ-1; NEA-1; UP-1; WS-1)
- Monk Moscrip, Stanford (AP-1; HJ-1; NEA-1; OS-1; UP-1; WS-1) (College Football Hall of Fame)
- Stanley Riordan, Oregon (OS-1)
- Eddie Erdelatz, St. Mary's (AP-2)
- Robert Brittingham, California (UP-2)
- Keith Topping, Stanford (AP-2; UP-2)

=== Tackles ===
- Larry Lutz, California (AP-1; HJ-1; NEA-1; OS-1; UP-1; WS-1)
- Bob Reynolds, Stanford (AP-1; HJ-1; NEA-1; OS-1; UP-1; WS-1) (College Football Hall of Fame)
- Herman Meister, St. Mary's (AP-2)
- Del Bjork, Oregon (AP-2; UP-2)
- Al Duvall, Loyola (UP-2)

=== Guards ===
- Lawrence Rouble, Stanford (AP-1; HJ-1; NEA-1; WS-1; UP-2)
- Nick Bassi, Santa Clara (HJ-1; UP-1)
- Max Starcevich, Washington (AP-1; UP-1) (College Football Hall of Fame)
- Conrad Tenney, California (NEA-1)
- Anderson, California (OS-1)
- Ross Carter, Oregon (OS-1; AP-2)
- Marty Kordick, St. Mary's (WS-1)
- Earl Sargent, UCLA (UP-2; AP-2)

=== Centers ===
- Sherm Chavoor, UCLA (UP-1; WS-1)
- Westley Muller, Stanford (AP-1; OS-1)
- Wagner Jorgensen, St. Mary's (HJ-1; UP-2)
- Bob Herwig, California (NEA-1; AP-2) (College Football Hall of Fame)

== Key ==
AP = Associated Press

HJ = Howard Jones, USC head coach

NEA = Newspaper Enterprise Association, "selected by sports writers of NEA Service newspapers throughout the Far West

OS = The Oregon Statesman

UP = United Press, "picked after polling sports editors, football writers, United Press correspondents, coaches and players"

WS = UCLA coach William H. Spaulding

Bold = Consensus first-team selection of the majority of the selectors listed above

== See also ==
- 1935 College Football All-America Team
