= List of Stanford Cardinal bowl games =

The Stanford Cardinal football team competes as part of the NCAA Division I Football Bowl Subdivision (FBS), representing Stanford University in the Atlantic Coast Conference. Prior to 1930, the team had no official nickname. From 1930 to 1972, the team was known as the Indians; from 1972 to 1981, the team was known as the Cardinals; since 1982, the team has competed as the Cardinal.

Since the establishment of the team in 1892, Stanford has appeared in 30 bowl games. Included in these games are 15 appearances in the Rose Bowl Game and six Bowl Championship Series (BCS)/New Year's Six game appearances with an overall record of 15 wins, 14 losses, and one tie.

== Bowl games ==
List of bowl games showing bowl played in, date, winning team, score, losing team, stadium, location, attendance, head coach, and MVP
#	Bowl	Date	Winning team	Score	Losing team	Stadium	Location	Attendance	Head coach	MVP
1	Rose Bowl	January 1, 1902	Michigan	L 0–49	Stanford	Rose Bowl	Pasadena, California	8,500	Charles Fickert	Neil Snow (Michigan)
2	Rose Bowl	January 1, 1925	Notre Dame	L 10–27	Stanford	Rose Bowl	Pasadena, California	53,000	Glenn "Pop" Warner	Ernie Nevers (Stanford); Elmer Layden (Notre Dame)
3	Rose Bowl	January 1, 1927	Stanford	T 7–7	Alabama	Rose Bowl	Pasadena, California	57,417	Glenn "Pop" Warner	Fred Pickhard (Alabama)
4	Rose Bowl	January 2, 1928	Stanford	W 7–6	Pittsburgh	Rose Bowl	Pasadena, California	70,000	Glenn "Pop" Warner	Biff Hoffman (Stanford)
5	Rose Bowl	January 1, 1934	Columbia	L 0–7	Stanford	Rose Bowl	Pasadena, California	35,000	Claude E. Thornhill	Cliff Montgomery (Columbia)
6	Rose Bowl	January 1, 1935	Alabama	L 13–29	Stanford	Rose Bowl	Pasadena, California	84,474	Claude E. Thornhill	Dixie Howell (Alabama)
7	Rose Bowl	January 1, 1936	Stanford	W 7–0	SMU	Rose Bowl	Pasadena, California	84,784	Claude E. Thornhill	Jim Moscrip (Stanford); Keith Topping (Stanford)
8	Rose Bowl	January 1, 1941	Stanford	W 21–13	Nebraska	Rose Bowl	Pasadena, California	92,000	Clark Shaughnessy	Pete Kmetovic (Stanford)
9	Rose Bowl	January 1, 1952	Illinois	L 7–40	Stanford	Rose Bowl	Pasadena, California	96,825	Chuck Taylor	Bill Tate (Illinois)
10	Rose Bowl	January 1, 1971	Stanford	W 27–17	Ohio State	Rose Bowl	Pasadena, California	103,839	John Ralston	Jim Plunkett (Stanford)
11	Rose Bowl	January 1, 1972	Stanford	W 13–12	Michigan	Rose Bowl	Pasadena, California	103,154	John Ralston	Don Bunce (Stanford)
12	Sun Bowl	December 31, 1977	Stanford	W 24–14	LSU	Sun Bowl Stadium	El Paso, Texas	31,318	Bill Walsh	Gordy Ceresino (Stanford); Charles Alexander (LSU)
13	Bluebonnet Bowl	December 31, 1978	Stanford	W 25–22	Georgia	Astrodome	Houston	34,084	Bill Walsh	Steve Dils (Stanford); Gordy Ceresino (Stanford)
14	Gator Bowl	December 27, 1986	Clemson	L 21–27	Stanford	Gator Bowl Stadium	Jacksonville, Florida	80,104	Jack Elway	Brad Muster (Stanford); Rodney Williams (Clemson)
15	Aloha Bowl	December 25, 1991	Georgia Tech	L 17–18	Stanford	Aloha Stadium	Honolulu, HI	34,433	Dennis Green	Tommy Vardell (Stanford); Shawn Jones (Georgia Tech)
16	Blockbuster Bowl	January 1, 1993	Stanford	W 24–3	Penn State	Joe Robbie Stadium	Miami Gardens, Florida	45,554	Bill Walsh	Darrien Gordon (Stanford)
17	Liberty Bowl	December 30, 1995	East Carolina	L 13–19	Stanford	Liberty Bowl Memorial Stadium	Memphis, Tennessee	47,398	Tyrone Willingham	Kwame Ellis (Stanford)
18	Sun Bowl	December 31, 1996	Stanford	W 38–0	Michigan State	Sun Bowl Stadium	El Paso, Texas	42,721	Tyrone Willingham	Chad Hutchinson (Stanford)
19	Rose Bowl	January 1, 2000	Wisconsin	L 9–17	Stanford	Rose Bowl	Pasadena, California	93,731	Tyrone Willingham	Ron Dayne (Wisconsin)
20	Seattle Bowl	December 27, 2001	Georgia Tech	L 14–24	Stanford	Safeco Field	Seattle, Washington	30,144	Tyrone Willingham	George Godsey (Georgia Tech)
21	Sun Bowl	December 31, 2009	Oklahoma	L 27–31	Stanford	Sun Bowl Stadium	El Paso, Texas	53,713	Jim Harbaugh	Ryan Broyles (Oklahoma)
22	Orange Bowl	January 3, 2011	Stanford	W 40–12	Virginia Tech	Sun Life Stadium	Miami Gardens, Florida	65,453	Jim Harbaugh	Andrew Luck (Stanford)
23	Fiesta Bowl	January 2, 2012	Oklahoma State	L 38–41 (OT)	Stanford	University of Phoenix Stadium	Glendale, Arizona	69,927	David Shaw	Justin Blackmon (Oklahoma State); Justin Gilbert (Oklahoma State)
24	Rose Bowl	January 1, 2013	Stanford	W 20–14	Wisconsin	Rose Bowl	Pasadena, California	93,359	David Shaw	Stepfan Taylor (Stanford); Usua Amanam (Stanford)
25	Rose Bowl	January 1, 2014	Michigan State	L 20–24	Stanford	Rose Bowl	Pasadena, California	95,173	David Shaw	Connor Cook (Michigan State); Kyler Elsworth (Michigan State)
26	Foster Farms Bowl	December 30, 2014	Stanford	W 45–21	Maryland	Levi's Stadium	Santa Clara, California	34,780	David Shaw	Kevin Hogan (Stanford); James Vaughters (Stanford)
27	Rose Bowl	January 1, 2016	Stanford	W 45–16	Iowa	Rose Bowl	Pasadena, California	94,268	David Shaw	Christian McCaffrey (Stanford); Aziz Shittu (Stanford)
28	Sun Bowl	December 30, 2016	Stanford	W 25–23	North Carolina	Sun Bowl Stadium	El Paso, Texas	42,166	David Shaw	Solomon Thomas (Stanford)
29	Alamo Bowl	December 28, 2017	TCU	L 37–39	Stanford	Alamodome	San Antonio, Texas	57,563	David Shaw	Kenny Hill (TCU); Travin Howard (TCU)
30	Sun Bowl	December 31, 2018	Stanford	W 14–13	Pitt	Sun Bowl	El Paso, Texas	40,680	David Shaw	Cameron Scarlett (Stanford)
