= 1935 Cal Poly Mustangs football team =

American college football season

1935 Cal Poly Mustangs football
- Conference: Independent
- Record: 5–2–1
- Head coach: Howie O'Daniels (3rd season)
- Home stadium: Mustang Stadium

1935 Western college football independents records
| | Conf. | | | Overall |
| Team | W | L | T | W | | L | | T |
|---|---|---|---|---|---|---|---|---|
| Idaho Southern Branch | | – | | 7 | – | 0 | – | 1 |
| Humboldt State | | – | | 6 | – | 1 | – | 1 |
| Cal Poly | | – | | 5 | – | 2 | – | 1 |
| Pomona | | – | | 5 | – | 2 | – | 1 |
| No. 23 Saint Mary's | | – | | 5 | – | 2 | – | 2 |
| Hawaii | | – | | 5 | – | 3 | – | 0 |
| San Francisco | | – | | 5 | – | 3 | – | 0 |
| Gonzaga | | – | | 5 | – | 4 | – | 1 |
| Loyola (CA) | | – | | 6 | – | 5 | – | 0 |
| San Jose State | | – | | 5 | – | 5 | – | 1 |
| Portland | | – | | 3 | – | 4 | – | 0 |
| Santa Clara | | – | | 3 | – | 6 | – | 1 |
| San Francisco State | | – | | 2 | – | 5 | – | 1 |
Rankings from United Press

The 1935 Cal Poly Mustangs football team represented California Polytechnic School—now known as California Polytechnic State University, San Luis Obispo—as an independent during the 1935 college football season. Led by third-year head coach Howie O'Daniels, Cal Poly compiled a record of 5–2–1. The team outscored its opponents 92 to 35 for the season and had four shutout wins. The Mustangs played home games at Mustang Stadium in San Luis Obispo, California.

Cal Poly was a two-year school until 1941 and competed as an independent from 1929 to 1945.

== Schedule ==
| Date | Opponent | Site | Result | Source |
|---|---|---|---|---|
| September 28 | at Moran Junior College (Note: Moran Junior College was founded in 1914 in Bainbridge Island, Washington. A satellite campus was opened in 1928 in Atascadero, California. Records show that the California site fielded football teams from 1929 to 1935. The Washington campus closed in 1935 and the California campus closed shortly thereafter.) | Atascadero, CA | W 6–0 | |
| October 4 | at Santa Maria | Santa Maria, CA | W 12–0 | |
| October 12 | Santa Barbara State freshmen | San Luis Obispo, CA | W 31–0 | |
| October 19 | at Menlo | Atherton, CA | W 24–0 | |
| November 2 | Bakersfield | San Luis Obispo, CA | L 6–20 | |
| November 11 | San Francisco freshmen | San Luis Obispo, CA | T 0–0 | |
| November 23 | at Salinas | Salinas, CA | W 1–0 (forfeit win) | |
| November 28 | Arizona State–Flagstaff | San Luis Obispo, CA | L 12–15 | |
