= Del Bjork =

American football player (1914–1988)

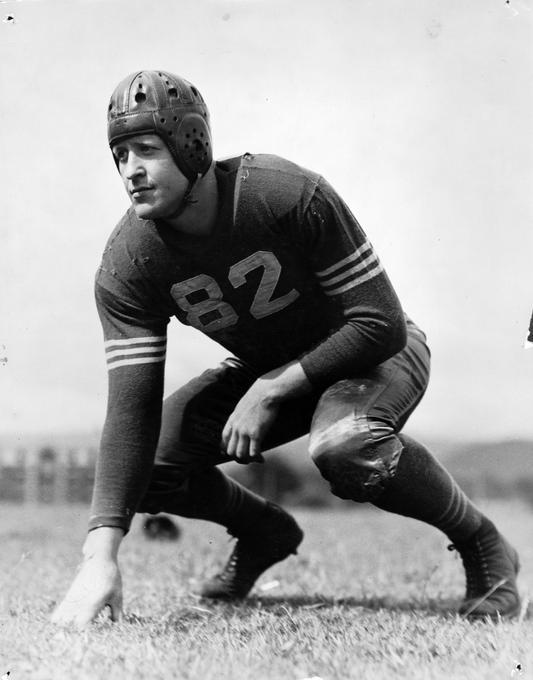
- Bjork, 1935, University of Oregon

No. 82
- Position: Offensive tackle

Personal information
- Born: June 27, 1914; Deep River, Washington, U.S.
- Died: August 26, 1988 (aged 74); Astoria, Oregon, U.S.
- Listed height: 6 ft 1 in (1.85 m)
- Listed weight: 218 lb (99 kg)

Career information
- High school: Astoria
- College: Oregon (1933-1936)
- NFL draft: 1937: 6th round, 58th overall pick

Career history
- Chicago Bears (1937–1938)

Awards and highlights
- NFL All-Star (1938); First-team All-PCC (1936); Second-team All-PCC (1935); Oregon Sports Hall of Fame (1982)

Career NFL statistics
- Games played: 20
- Games started: 9
- Stats at Pro Football Reference

Delbert Leonard Bjork (June 27, 1914 – August 26, 1988) was an American professional football tackle who played collegiately for the University of Oregon from 1934 to 1936 and for the Chicago Bears of the National Football League (NFL) in 1937 and 1938.

Despite his short playing career, Bjork was selected for the NFL All-Star game in 1938. He was inducted into the Oregon Sports Hall of Fame in 1982.

== Biography ==
=== Early life ===
Del Bjork was born in Deep River, Washington and grew up in Astoria, Oregon. He played football for Astoria High School.

=== College career ===
In the fall of 1933, Bjork enrolled at the University of Oregon, located in Eugene, Oregon. He was part of the largest turnout in school history to try out for the freshman football squad, with 74 men still on the roster after the first week of practice. Bjork not only made coach Bill Reinhart's team, but won himself a place on the starting roster at tackle.

In 1934 Bjork was promoted to the Oregon varsity football squad and he made his presence known immediately as the outstanding sophomore on the squad, apparently winning a starting position at guard in summer practice filling the hole vacated by graduating senior Bree Cuppoletti.

Bjork played for the University of Oregon varsity from 1934 to 1936. During summers he returned home to Astoria, where he worked in a creamery.

After receiving his BS in physical education from the University of Oregon in 1937 he was drafted by the Chicago Bears in the sixth round.

On September 1, 1937, Bjork played with the College All-Stars against the Green Bay Packers at Soldier Field in Chicago, emerging victorious over the NFL champions by a score of 6–0.

=== Professional career ===
Bjork played for the Chicago Bears of the National Football League (NFL) from 1937 to 1938. For his performance during the 1938 season, he was named to the NFL's first-ever All-Star game; the 1939 NFL All-Star Game.

=== Life after football ===
In 1940 Bjork earned an MS in education from the University of Oregon. He then went on to have a successful career in the military.

Bjork was awarded the Purple Heart with oak leaf clusters in 1944. As a captain he was recognized with the Distinguished Service Cross for his World War II service. After the war he continued his career in the military earning the rank of colonel and was published in Military Review in 1951.

=== Death and legacy ===
Del Bjork died August 26, 1988, at Astoria.

Bjork was inducted into the Oregon Sports Hall of Fame in 1982.
