= 1935 Saint Mary's Gaels football team =

American college football season

1935 Saint Mary's Gaels football
- Conference: Independent
- Record: 5–2–2
- Head coach: Slip Madigan (15th season)
- Home stadium: Kezar Stadium

1935 Western college football independents records
| | Conf. | | | Overall |
| Team | W | L | T | W | | L | | T |
|---|---|---|---|---|---|---|---|---|
| Idaho Southern Branch | | – | | 7 | – | 0 | – | 1 |
| Humboldt State | | – | | 6 | – | 1 | – | 1 |
| Cal Poly | | – | | 5 | – | 2 | – | 1 |
| Pomona | | – | | 5 | – | 2 | – | 1 |
| No. 23 Saint Mary's | | – | | 5 | – | 2 | – | 2 |
| Hawaii | | – | | 5 | – | 3 | – | 0 |
| San Francisco | | – | | 5 | – | 3 | – | 0 |
| Gonzaga | | – | | 5 | – | 4 | – | 1 |
| Loyola (CA) | | – | | 6 | – | 5 | – | 0 |
| San Jose State | | – | | 5 | – | 5 | – | 1 |
| Portland | | – | | 3 | – | 4 | – | 0 |
| Santa Clara | | – | | 3 | – | 6 | – | 1 |
| San Francisco State | | – | | 2 | – | 5 | – | 1 |
Rankings from United Press

The 1935 Saint Mary's Gaels football team was an American football team that represented Saint Mary's College of California during the 1935 college football season. In their 15th season under head coach Slip Madigan, the Gaels compiled a 5–2–2 record and outscored their opponents by a combined total of 115 to 37.

Two Gaels received honors on the 1935 All-Pacific Coast football team: guard Marty Kordick (William H. Spaulding, 1st team); and center Wagner Jorgensen (Howard Jones, 1st team).

== Schedule ==
| Date | Opponent | Site | Result | Attendance | Source |
|---|---|---|---|---|---|
| September 29 | Nevada | Kezar Stadium; San Francisco, CA | W 20–0 | 25,000 | |
| October 5 | at California | California Memorial Stadium; Berkeley, CA | L 0–10 | 50,000 | |
| October 12 | Pacific (CA) | Kezar Stadium; San Francisco, CA | W 33–0 | 10,000 | |
| October 26 | vs. San Francisco | Kezar Stadium; San Francisco, CA | W 13–0 | 30,000 | |
| November 9 | at Fordham | Polo Grounds; New York, NY | T 7–7 | 55,000 | |
| November 17 | vs. Santa Clara | Kezar Stadium; San Francisco, CA | W 10–0 | 60,000 | |
| November 30 | Washington State | Kezar Stadium; San Francisco, CA | T 7–7 | 10,000 | |
| December 8 | Oregon | Kezar Stadium; San Francisco, CA (Governors' Trophy Game) | W 18–0 | 15,000 | |
| December 14 | UCLA | Kezar Stadium; San Francisco, CA | L 7–13 | 20,000 | |
