= 1935 Idaho Vandals football team =

American college football season

1935 Idaho Vandals football
- Conference: Pacific Coast Conference
- Record: 2–7 (1–5 PCC)
- Head coach: Ted Bank (1st season)
- Captain: Bob McCue
- Home stadium: MacLean Field

1935 Pacific Coast Conference football standings
	Conf.					Overall
Team	W		L		T	W		L		T
No. 6 Stanford ^ +	4	–	1	–	0	8	–	1	–	0
No. 9 California +	4	–	1	–	0	9	–	1	–	0
No. 18 UCLA +	4	–	1	–	0	8	–	2	–	0
Washington State	3	–	2	–	0	5	–	3	–	1
Oregon	3	–	2	–	0	6	–	3	–	0
No. 23 Washington	4	–	3	–	0	5	–	3	–	0
Oregon State	2	–	3	–	1	6	–	4	–	1
USC	2	–	4	–	0	5	–	7	–	0
Idaho	1	–	5	–	0	2	–	7	–	0
Montana	0	–	5	–	1	1	–	5	–	2
+ – Conference co-champions; ^ – Selected as Rose Bowl representative; Rankings from United Press

The 1935 Idaho Vandals football team represented the University of Idaho in the 1935 college football season. The Vandals were led by first-year head coach Ted Bank, and were members of the Pacific Coast Conference. Home games were played on campus in Moscow at MacLean Field, with one in Boise at Public School Field.

Idaho compiled a 2–7 overall record and lost all but one of its six games in the PCC, defeating cellar rival Montana.

In the Battle of the Palouse with neighbor Washington State, the Vandals suffered an eighth straight loss, falling 0–6 at homecoming in Moscow on November 9. Idaho's most recent win in the series was ten years earlier in 1925 and the next was nineteen years away in 1954.

== Schedule ==
Date	Opponent	Site	Result	Attendance	Source
September 28	at Washington	Husky Stadium; Seattle, WA	L 0–14	15,438	
October 5	at Gonzaga*	Gonzaga Stadium; Spokane, WA (rivalry)	L 6–7	7,000	
October 12	Whitman*	MacLean Field; Moscow, ID	L 0–7		
October 19	at Oregon	Hayward Field; Eugene, OR	L 0–14	7,500	
October 26	Montana	MacLean Field; Moscow, ID (rivalry)	W 14–7		
November 9	Washington State^{†}	MacLean Field; Moscow, ID (Battle of the Palouse)	L 0–6	7,000	
November 16	at Oregon State	Bell Field; Corvallis, OR	L 0–13	3,500	
November 23	vs. Nevada*	Public School Field; Boise, ID	W 26–6		
November 30	at UCLA	Los Angeles Memorial Coliseum; Los Angeles, CA	L 6–13	7,000	
*Non-conference game; ^{†}Homecoming; Source:

== All-conference ==
No Vandals were named to the All-Coast team; tackle Bob McCue was a third team selection, and halfback Theron Ward was honorable mention.

== NFL draft ==
One Vandal senior was selected in the inaugural 1936 NFL draft, which lasted nine rounds (81 selections).

Player	Position	Round	Overall	Franchise
Theron Ward	Back	4th	34	Green Bay Packers
