= 1935 Fresno State Bulldogs football team =

American college football season

1935 Fresno State Bulldogs football

FWC champion
- Conference: Far Western Conference
- Record: 6–3 (4–0 FWC)
- Head coach: Leo Harris (3rd season)
- Home stadium: Fresno State College Stadium

1935 Far Western Conference football standings
	Conf.					Overall
Team	W		L		T	W		L		T
Fresno State $	4	–	0	–	0	6	–	3	–	0
Pacific (CA)	3	–	1	–	0	5	–	4	–	1
Nevada	2	–	2	–	0	2	–	6	–	0
Cal Aggies	1	–	3	–	0	2	–	6	–	1
Chico State	0	–	4	–	0	2	–	5	–	1
$ – Conference champion

The 1935 Fresno State Bulldogs football team represented Fresno State Normal School—now known as California State University, Fresno—during the 1935 college football season.

Fresno State competed in the Far Western Conference (FWC). (Note: The Northern California Athletic Conference (NCAC) was known as the Far Western Conference (FWC) from its founding in 1925 to 1982.) The 1935 team was led by third-year head coach Leo Harris and played home games at Fresno State College Stadium (Note: Ratcliffe Stadium was known as Fresno State College Stadium from 1926 to 1940.) on the campus of Fresno City College in Fresno, California. They finished the season as champion of the FWC, with a record of six wins and three losses (6–3, 4–0 FWC). The Bulldogs outscored their opponents 199–84 for the season, including holding their opponents under 10 points in six of the nine games.

== Schedule ==
Date	Opponent	Site	Result	Attendance	Source
September 28	La Verne*	Fresno State College Stadium; Fresno, CA	W 46–0	3,601	
October 5	California JV*	Fresno State College Stadium; Fresno, CA	L 7–13	4,935	
October 12	Santa Clara*	Fresno State College Stadium; Fresno, CA	L 0–24	8,500	
October 19	at Chico State	College Field; Chico, CA	W 13–0		
October 26	Caltech	Fresno State College Stadium; Fresno, CA	W 51–7	2,240	
November 2	Pacific (CA)	Fresno State College Stadium; Fresno, CA	W 20–7	3,833	
November 11	at Nevada	Mackay Stadium (Note: This stadium is the predecessor to the current Mackay Stadium, which was opened for the 1966 season.); Reno, NV	W 27–6	3,500	
November 16	at Cal Aggies	A Street field; Davis, CA	W 31–6		
November 28	San Francisco*	Fresno State College Stadium; Fresno, CA	L 3–21	7,647	
*Non-conference game
