= 1935 Portland Pilots football team =

American college football season

1935 Portland Pilots football
- Conference: Independent
- Record: 3–4
- Head coach: Gene Murphy (9th season)
- Home stadium: Multnomah Stadium

1935 Western college football independents records
	Conf.			Overall
Team	W	L	T	W		L		T
Idaho Southern Branch		–		7	–	0	–	1
Humboldt State		–		6	–	1	–	1
Cal Poly		–		5	–	2	–	1
Pomona		–		5	–	2	–	1
No. 23 Saint Mary's		–		5	–	2	–	2
Hawaii		–		5	–	3	–	0
San Francisco		–		5	–	3	–	0
Gonzaga		–		5	–	4	–	1
Loyola (CA)		–		6	–	5	–	0
San Jose State		–		5	–	5	–	1
Portland		–		3	–	4	–	0
Santa Clara		–		3	–	6	–	1
San Francisco State		–		2	–	5	–	1
Rankings from United Press

The 1935 Portland Pilots football team was an American football team that represented the University of Portland as an independent during the 1935 college football season. In its ninth year under head coach Gene Murphy, the team compiled a 3–4 record. The team played its home games at Multnomah Stadium in Portland, Oregon. The school had been known as Columbia University prior to the 1935 season; the 1935 team was the first to compete under the "Portland Pilots" name.

== Schedule ==
Date	Opponent	Site	Result	Attendance	Source
October 4	Pacific (OR)	Multnomah Stadium; Portland, OR	W 13–7		
October 13	Fort Lewis	Multnomah Stadium; Portland, OR	W 13–8		
October 19	Linfield	Multnomah Stadium; Portland, OR	W 7–6		
October 26	at Santa Clara	Kezar Stadium; San Francisco, CA	L 7–20		
November 2	at Oregon State	Bell Field; Corvallis, OR	L 2–19		
November 16	Oregon	Multnomah Stadium; Portland, OR	L 0–6		
November 28	at Gonzaga	Gonzaga Stadium; Spokane, WA	L 0–20		
