= 1935 Hawaii Rainbows football team =

American college football season

1935 Hawaii Rainbows football

Poi Bowl, L 6–38 vs. USC
- Conference: Independent
- Record: 5–3
- Head coach: Otto Klum (15th season)
- Home stadium: Honolulu Stadium

1935 Western college football independents records
	Conf.			Overall
Team	W	L	T	W		L		T
Idaho Southern Branch		–		7	–	0	–	1
Humboldt State		–		6	–	1	–	1
Cal Poly		–		5	–	2	–	1
Pomona		–		5	–	2	–	1
No. 23 Saint Mary's		–		5	–	2	–	2
Hawaii		–		5	–	3	–	0
San Francisco		–		5	–	3	–	0
Gonzaga		–		5	–	4	–	1
Loyola (CA)		–		6	–	5	–	0
San Jose State		–		5	–	5	–	1
Portland		–		3	–	4	–	0
Santa Clara		–		3	–	6	–	1
San Francisco State		–		2	–	5	–	1
Rankings from United Press

The 1935 Hawaii Rainbows football team represented the University of Hawaiʻi (now known as the University of Hawaiʻi at Mānoa) as an independent during the 1935 college football season. Led by 15th-year head coach Otto Klum, the Rainbows compiled an overall record of 5–3.

== Schedule ==
Date	Opponent	Site	Result	Attendance	Source
September 27	Saint Louis School alumni	Honolulu Stadium; Honolulu, Territory of Hawaii	W 18–0	9,000	
October 4	McKinley High School alumni	Honolulu Stadium; Honolulu, Territory of Hawaii	W 40–0	8,000	
October 16	Kamehameha alumni	Honolulu Stadium; Honolulu, Territory of Hawaii	W 19–7	11,000	
October 25	Honolulu Town Team	Honolulu Stadium; Honolulu, Territory of Hawaii	W 10–7	18,000	
November 9	at Denver	DU Stadium; Denver, CO	L 7–14	15,000	
November 15	at UCLA	Los Angeles Memorial Coliseum; Los Angeles, CA	L 6–19	16,000	
December 14	Utah	Honolulu Stadium; Honolulu, Territory of Hawaii	W 21–20	17,000	
January 1, 1936	USC	Honolulu Stadium; Honolulu, Territory of Hawaii (Poi Bowl)	L 6–38	18,000	
