= 1935 San Jose State Spartans football team =

American college football season

1935 San Jose State Spartans football
- Conference: Independent
- Record: 5–5–1
- Head coach: Dudley DeGroot (4th season)
- Home stadium: Spartan Stadium

1935 Western college football independents records
	Conf.			Overall
Team	W	L	T	W		L		T
Idaho Southern Branch		–		7	–	0	–	1
Humboldt State		–		6	–	1	–	1
Cal Poly		–		5	–	2	–	1
Pomona		–		5	–	2	–	1
No. 23 Saint Mary's		–		5	–	2	–	2
Hawaii		–		5	–	3	–	0
San Francisco		–		5	–	3	–	0
Gonzaga		–		5	–	4	–	1
Loyola (CA)		–		6	–	5	–	0
San Jose State		–		5	–	5	–	1
Portland		–		3	–	4	–	0
Santa Clara		–		3	–	6	–	1
San Francisco State		–		2	–	5	–	1
Rankings from United Press

The 1935 San Jose State Spartans football team represented State Teachers College at San Jose. (Note: San Jose State University was known as San Jose State College from 1935 to 1971.) The Spartans were led by fourth-year head coach Dudley DeGroot and played home games at Spartan Stadium. The team played as an independent in 1935, after having been a member of the Far Western Conference (FWC) (Note: The Northern California Athletic Conference (NCAC) was known as the Far Western Conference (FWC) from its founding in 1925 to 1982.) for the previous six seasons. The Spartans finished with a record of five wins, five losses, and one tie (5–5–1).

== Schedule ==
Date	Opponent	Site	Result	Attendance	Source
September 21	at Willamette (OR)	Sweetland Field; Salem, OR	L 0–14		
September 28	at Stanford	Stanford Stadium; Stanford, CA (rivalry)	L 0–35		
October 12	McKinley High School	Spartan Stadium; San Jose, CA	W 19–0		
October 18	at Pacific (CA)	Baxter Stadium; Stockton, CA (rivalry)	T 0–0		
October 26	American Legion	Spartan Stadium; San Jose, CA	L 0–3		
November 1	Whittier	Spartan Stadium; San Jose, CA	L 6–14		
November 11	at Redlands	Redlands Stadium (Note: This stadium is the predecessor to the current Ted Runner Stadium on the University of Redlands campus, which was opened for the 1968 season); Redlands, CA	L 0–7		
November 16	Nevada	Spartan Stadium; San Jose, CA	W 20–6		
November 22	Humboldt State	Spartan Stadium; San Jose, CA	W 25–6	2,000	
November 28	San Diego State	Spartan Stadium; San Jose, CA	W 24–9	5,000	
December 7	at Kamehameha High School	Kunuiakea Stadium; Honolulu, HI	W 22–7		
