= 1935 Oregon State Beavers football team =

American college football season

1935 Oregon State Beavers football
- Conference: Pacific Coast Conference
- Record: 6–4–1 (2–3–1 PCC)
- Head coach: Lon Stiner
- Home stadium: Bell Field

1935 Pacific Coast Conference football standings
	Conf.					Overall
Team	W		L		T	W		L		T
No. 6 Stanford ^ +	4	–	1	–	0	8	–	1	–	0
No. 9 California +	4	–	1	–	0	9	–	1	–	0
No. 18 UCLA +	4	–	1	–	0	8	–	2	–	0
Washington State	3	–	2	–	0	5	–	3	–	1
Oregon	3	–	2	–	0	6	–	3	–	0
No. 23 Washington	4	–	3	–	0	5	–	3	–	0
Oregon State	2	–	3	–	1	6	–	4	–	1
USC	2	–	4	–	0	5	–	7	–	0
Idaho	1	–	5	–	0	2	–	7	–	0
Montana	0	–	5	–	1	1	–	5	–	2
+ – Conference co-champions; ^ – Selected as Rose Bowl representative; Rankings from United Press

The 1935 Oregon State Beavers football team represented Oregon State College in the Pacific Coast Conference (PCC) during the 1935 college football season.

In their third season under head coach Lon Stiner, the Beavers compiled a 6–4–1 record (2–3–1 against PCC opponents), finished in seventh place in the PCC, and outscored their opponents, 175 to 100.

The team played its home games at Bell Field in Corvallis, Oregon and Multnomah Stadium in Portland.

The 1935 OSC squad finished the season ranked #74 in the country.

== Schedule ==
Date	Opponent	Site	Result	Attendance	Source
September 21	Linfield*	Bell Field; Corvallis, OR	W 31–0		
September 28	Willamette*	Bell Field; Corvallis, OR	W 26–0		
October 5	UCLA	Multnomah Stadium; Portland, OR	L 7–20	10,000	
October 11	Gonzaga*	Bell Field; Corvallis, OR	W 33–6		
October 19	at USC	Los Angeles Memorial Coliseum; Los Angeles, CA	W 13–7	35,000	
October 26	Washington State	Multnomah Stadium; Portland, OR	L 13–26	20,000	
November 2	Portland*	Bell Field; Corvallis, OR	W 19–2		
November 9	at Oregon	Hayward Field; Eugene, OR (rivalry)	L 0–13	16,000	
November 16	Idaho	Bell Field; Corvallis, OR	W 13–0	3,500	
November 23	at Montana	Dornblaser Field; Missoula, MT	T 0–0	4,000	
November 28	at Nebraska*	Memorial Stadium; Lincoln, NE	L 20–26	25,000	
*Non-conference game

== Roster ==
- HB Joe Gray, So.
