= 1935 Washington State Cougars football team =

American college football season

1935 Washington State Cougars football
- Conference: Pacific Coast Conference
- Record: 5–3–1 (3–2 PCC)
- Head coach: Babe Hollingbery (10th season)
- Captain: John Bley
- Home stadium: Rogers Field

1935 Pacific Coast Conference football standings
	Conf.					Overall
Team	W		L		T	W		L		T
No. 6 Stanford ^ +	4	–	1	–	0	8	–	1	–	0
No. 9 California +	4	–	1	–	0	9	–	1	–	0
No. 18 UCLA +	4	–	1	–	0	8	–	2	–	0
Washington State	3	–	2	–	0	5	–	3	–	1
Oregon	3	–	2	–	0	6	–	3	–	0
No. 23 Washington	4	–	3	–	0	5	–	3	–	0
Oregon State	2	–	3	–	1	6	–	4	–	1
USC	2	–	4	–	0	5	–	7	–	0
Idaho	1	–	5	–	0	2	–	7	–	0
Montana	0	–	5	–	1	1	–	5	–	2
+ – Conference co-champions; ^ – Selected as Rose Bowl representative; Rankings from United Press

The 1935 Washington State Cougars Football Team was an American football team that represented Washington State College during the 1935 college football season. Tenth-year head coach Babe Hollingbery led the team to a 3–2 mark in the Pacific Coast Conference (PCC) and 5–3–1 overall.

The Cougars played their four home games on campus at Rogers Field in Pullman, Washington, with a road game in nearby Moscow against Palouse rival Idaho.

== Schedule ==
Date	Opponent	Site	Result	Attendance	Source
September 28	Puget Sound*	Rogers Field; Pullman, WA	W 46–6	4,000	
October 5	Willamette*	Rogers Field; Pullman, WA	W 33–0	6,000	
October 12	at Montana	Dornblaser Field; Missoula, NT	W 13–7	6,000	
October 19	Washington	Rogers Field; Pullman, WA (rivalry)	L 0–21	20,000	
October 26	at Oregon State	Multnomah Stadium; Portland, OR	W 26–13	20,000	
November 2	Gonzaga*	Rogers Field; Pullman, WA	L 0–7	5,000	
November 9	at Idaho	MacLean Field; Moscow, ID (rivalry)	W 6–0	6,000	
November 16	at USC	Los Angeles Memorial Coliseum; Los Angeles, CA	L 10–20	40,000	
November 30	at Saint Mary's*	Kezar Stadium; San Francisco, CA	T 7–7	15,000	
*Non-conference game; Source:
