= 1935 Nevada Wolf Pack football team =

American college football season

1935 Nevada Wolf Pack football
- Conference: Far Western Conference
- Record: 2–6 (2–2 FWC)
- Head coach: Brick Mitchell (4th season)
- Home stadium: Mackay Field

1935 Far Western Conference football standings
	Conf.					Overall
Team	W		L		T	W		L		T
Fresno State $	4	–	0	–	0	6	–	3	–	0
Pacific (CA)	3	–	1	–	0	5	–	4	–	1
Nevada	2	–	2	–	0	2	–	6	–	0
Cal Aggies	1	–	3	–	0	2	–	6	–	1
Chico State	0	–	4	–	0	2	–	5	–	1
$ – Conference champion

The 1935 Nevada Wolf Pack football team was an American football team that represented the University of Nevada in the Far Western Conference (FWC) during the 1935 college football season. In their fourth and final season under head coach Brick Mitchell, the team compiled a 2–6 record (2–2 FWC) and finished third in the conference.

== Schedule ==
Date	Opponent	Site	Result	Attendance	Source
September 28	at Saint Mary's*	Kezar Stadium; San Francisco, CA	L 0–20	25,000	
October 12	San Francisco*	Mackay Field; Reno, NV	L 7–27	3,500	
October 26	Pacific (CA)	Mackay Field; Reno, NV	L 6–7		
November 2	Cal Aggies	Mackay Field; Reno, NV	W 12–6		
November 11	Fresno State	Mackay Field; Reno, NV	L 6–27	3,500	
November 16	at San Jose State*	Spartan Stadium; San Jose, CA	L 6–20	5,000	
November 22	vs. Idaho*	Public School Field; Boise, ID	L 6–26		
November 28	at Chico State	College Field; Chico, CA	W 14–6	2,500	
*Non-conference game
