= 1935 Washington Huskies football team =

American college football season

1935 Washington Huskies football
- Conference: Pacific Coast Conference
- Record: 5–3 (4–3 PCC)
- Head coach: James Phelan (6th season)
- Captain: Dan Lazarevich
- Home stadium: University of Washington Stadium

1935 Pacific Coast Conference football standings
	Conf.					Overall
Team	W		L		T	W		L		T
No. 6 Stanford ^ +	4	–	1	–	0	8	–	1	–	0
No. 9 California +	4	–	1	–	0	9	–	1	–	0
No. 18 UCLA +	4	–	1	–	0	8	–	2	–	0
Washington State	3	–	2	–	0	5	–	3	–	1
Oregon	3	–	2	–	0	6	–	3	–	0
No. 23 Washington	4	–	3	–	0	5	–	3	–	0
Oregon State	2	–	3	–	1	6	–	4	–	1
USC	2	–	4	–	0	5	–	7	–	0
Idaho	1	–	5	–	0	2	–	7	–	0
Montana	0	–	5	–	1	1	–	5	–	2
+ – Conference co-champions; ^ – Selected as Rose Bowl representative; Rankings from United Press

The 1935 Washington Huskies football team was an American football team that represented the University of Washington during the 1935 college football season. In its sixth season under head coach Jimmy Phelan, the team compiled a 5–3 record, finished in sixth place in the Pacific Coast Conference, and outscored all opponents by a combined total of 93 to 42. Dan Lazarevich was the team captain.

== Schedule ==
Date	Opponent	Site	Result	Attendance	Source
September 28	Idaho	University of Washington Stadium; Seattle, WA	W 14–0	15,438	
October 5	Santa Clara*	University of Washington Stadium; Seattle, WA	W 13–6	19,543	
October 19	at Washington State	Rogers Field; Pullman, WA (rivalry)	W 21–0	20,000	
October 26	Stanford	University of Washington Stadium; Seattle, WA	L 0–6	35,098	
November 2	Montana	University of Washington Stadium; Seattle, WA	W 33–7	10,573	
November 9	at California	California Memorial Stadium; Berkeley, CA	L 0–14	48,734	
November 23	Oregon	University of Washington Stadium; Seattle, WA (rivalry)	L 6–7	20,992	
December 7	at USC	Los Angeles Memorial Coliseum; Los Angeles, CA	W 6–2	45,000	
*Non-conference game; Source:
