= The Score Takes Care of Itself =

2009 book by Bill Walsh

- Author: Bill Walsh
- Subject: Leadership, biography
- Publisher: Portfolio
- Publication date: 2009
- Pages: 288
- ISBN: 9781591843474

The Score Takes Care of Itself: My Philosophy of Leadership is a 2009 book on the American football coach Bill Walsh's philosophy, written posthumously by Steve Jamison and Craig Walsh based on interviews and notes. Walsh emphasizes organizational ethics, a high standard of performance, and the leader as teacher. The book includes writings from Walsh's colleagues and luminaries in football.
