= 1935 San Francisco Dons football team =

American college football season

1935 San Francisco Dons football
- Conference: Independent
- Record: 5–3
- Head coach: Spud Lewis (4th season)
- Home stadium: Kezar Stadium

1935 Western college football independents records
| | Conf. | | | Overall |
| Team | W | L | T | W | | L | | T |
|---|---|---|---|---|---|---|---|---|
| Idaho Southern Branch | | – | | 7 | – | 0 | – | 1 |
| Humboldt State | | – | | 6 | – | 1 | – | 1 |
| Cal Poly | | – | | 5 | – | 2 | – | 1 |
| Pomona | | – | | 5 | – | 2 | – | 1 |
| No. 23 Saint Mary's | | – | | 5 | – | 2 | – | 2 |
| Hawaii | | – | | 5 | – | 3 | – | 0 |
| San Francisco | | – | | 5 | – | 3 | – | 0 |
| Gonzaga | | – | | 5 | – | 4 | – | 1 |
| Loyola (CA) | | – | | 6 | – | 5 | – | 0 |
| San Jose State | | – | | 5 | – | 5 | – | 1 |
| Portland | | – | | 3 | – | 4 | – | 0 |
| Santa Clara | | – | | 3 | – | 6 | – | 1 |
| San Francisco State | | – | | 2 | – | 5 | – | 1 |
Rankings from United Press

The 1935 San Francisco Dons football team was an American football team that represented the University of San Francisco as an independent during the 1935 college football season. In their fourth season under head coach Spud Lewis, the Dons compiled a 5–3 record and outscored their opponents by a combined total of 104 to 55.

== Schedule ==
| Date | Opponent | Site | Result | Attendance | Source |
|---|---|---|---|---|---|
| September 28 | Santa Clara | Kezar Stadium; San Francisco, CA | L 7–20 | 30,000–40,000 | |
| October 5 | Stanford | Kezar Stadium; San Francisco, CA | L 0–10 | 25,000 | |
| October 12 | at Nevada | Reno, NV | W 27–7 | 3,500 | |
| October 20 | at Gonzaga | Gonzaga Stadium; Spokane, WA | W 20–0 | 6,000 | |
| October 26 | Saint Mary's | Kezar Stadium; San Francisco, CA | L 0–13 | 30,000 | |
| November 3 | Loyola (CA) | Kezar Stadium; San Francisco, CA | W 9–0 | 7,000 | |
| November 16 | Denver | Kezar Stadium; San Francisco, CA | W 20–2 | < 2,000 | |
| November 29 | at Fresno State | Fresno State College Stadium; Fresno, CA | W 21–3 | | |
