= 1935 Pacific Tigers football team =

American college football season

1935 Pacific Tigers football
- Conference: Far Western Conference
- Record: 5–4–1 (3–1 FWC)
- Head coach: Amos Alonzo Stagg (3rd season)
- Home stadium: Baxter Stadium

1935 Far Western Conference football standings
	Conf.					Overall
Team	W		L		T	W		L		T
Fresno State $	4	–	0	–	0	6	–	3	–	0
Pacific (CA)	3	–	1	–	0	5	–	4	–	1
Nevada	2	–	2	–	0	2	–	6	–	0
Cal Aggies	1	–	3	–	0	2	–	6	–	1
Chico State	0	–	4	–	0	2	–	5	–	1
$ – Conference champion

The 1935 Pacific Tigers football team represented the College of the Pacific—now known as the University of the Pacific—in Stockton, California as a member of the Far Western Conference (FWC) during the 1935 college football season. Led by third-year head coach Amos Alonzo Stagg, Pacific compiled an overall record of 5–4–1 with a mark of 3–1 in conference play, placing second in the FWC. The team was outscored by its opponents 124 to 106 for the season. The Tigers played home games at Baxter Stadium in Stockton.

== Schedule ==
Date	Opponent	Site	Result	Attendance	Source
October 5	at USC*	Los Angeles Memorial Coliseum; Los Angeles, CA	L 7–19	35,000	
October 12	at Saint Mary's*	Kezar Stadium; San Francisco, CA	L 0–33	10,000	
October 18	San Jose State*	Baxter Stadium; Stockton, CA (rivalry)	T 0–0		
October 26	at Nevada	Mackay Stadium (Note: This stadium is the predecessor to the current Mackay Stadium, which was opened for the 1966 season.); Reno, NV	W 7–6		
November 2	at Fresno State	Fresno State College Stadium; Fresno, CA	L 7–20	3,833	
November 9	Chico State^{†}	Baxter Stadium; Stockton, CA	W 20–0		
November 16	at California*	California Memorial Stadium; Berkeley, CA	L 0–39		
November 22	at Cal Aggies	[Davis, CA	W 26–0		
November 28	San Diego Marines (Note: The Marine Corps Recruit Depot (MCRD) in San Diego fielded a team that played against colleges and other military teams from 1922 to 1964.)*	Baxter Stadium; Stockton, CA	W 20–0		
December 7	at San Diego State*	Balboa Stadium; San Diego, CA	W 19–7	4,200	
*Non-conference game; ^{†}Homecoming
