= 1935 Chico State Wildcats football team =

American college football season

1935 Chico State Wildcats football
- Conference: Far Western Conference
- Record: 2–5–1 (0–4 FWC)
- Head coach: Art Acker (13th season)
- Home stadium: College Field

1935 Far Western Conference football standings
	Conf.					Overall
Team	W		L		T	W		L		T
Fresno State $	4	–	0	–	0	6	–	3	–	0
Pacific (CA)	3	–	1	–	0	5	–	4	–	1
Nevada	2	–	2	–	0	2	–	6	–	0
Cal Aggies	1	–	3	–	0	2	–	6	–	1
Chico State	0	–	4	–	0	2	–	5	–	1
$ – Conference champion

The 1935 Chico State Wildcats football team represented Chico State College—now known as California State University, Chico—as a member of the Far Western Conference (FWC) during the 1935 college football season. Led by 13th-year head coach Art Acker, Chico State compiled an overall record of 2–5–1 with a mark of 0–4 in conference play, placing last out of five teams in the FWC. The team was outscored by its opponents 94 to 54 for the season. The Wildcats played home games at College Field in Chico, California.

== Schedule ==
Date	Opponent	Site	Result	Attendance	Source
September 28	Sacramento*	College Field; Chico, CA	T 0–0		
October 5	at San Francisco State*	Ewing Field; San Francisco, CA	W 24–0		
October 19	Fresno State	College Field; Chico, CA	L 0–13		
October 26	at Cal Aggies	A Street field; Davis, CA	L 3–21		
November 2	at Humboldt State*	Albee Stadium; Eureka, CA	L 0–19		
November 9	at Pacific (CA)	Baxter Stadium; Stockton, CA	L 0–20		
November 16	Southern Oregon Normal*	College Field; Chico, CA	W 21–7		
November 28	Nevada	College Field; Chico, CA	L 6–14	2,500	
*Non-conference game
