= 1935 Cal Aggies football team =

American college football season

1935 Cal Aggies football
- Conference: Far Western Conference
- Record: 2–6–1 (1–3 FWC)
- Head coach: Crip Toomey (8th season)
- Captain: Chris Graves
- Home stadium: A Street field

1935 Far Western Conference football standings
	Conf.					Overall
Team	W		L		T	W		L		T
Fresno State $	4	–	0	–	0	6	–	3	–	0
Pacific (CA)	3	–	1	–	0	5	–	4	–	1
Nevada	2	–	2	–	0	2	–	6	–	0
Cal Aggies	1	–	3	–	0	2	–	6	–	1
Chico State	0	–	4	–	0	2	–	5	–	1
$ – Conference champion

The 1935 Cal Aggies football team represented the Northern Branch of the College of Agriculture—now known as the University of California, Davis—as a member of the Far Western Conference (FWC) during the 1935 college football season. Led by eighth-year head coach Crip Toomey, the Aggies compiled an overall record of 2–6–1 with a mark of 1–3 in conference play, placing fourth in the FWC. The team was outscored by its opponents 199 to 47 for the season. The Aggies were shut out four times and in only one game did they score more than a touchdown. The Cal Aggies played home games at A Street field on campus in Davis, California.

== Schedule ==
Date	Time	Opponent	Site	Result	Source
September 28		at California*	California Memorial Stadium; Berkeley, CA	L 0–47	
October 4		at Humboldt State*	Albee Stadium; Eureka, CA	L 0–19	
October 12		at California JV (Note: The University of California JV team was commonly known as the "Cal Ramblers".)*	California Memorial Stadium; Berkeley, CA	L 0–47	
October 19	2:00 p.m.	at Sacramento*	Sacramento Stadium; Sacramento, CA	T 7–7	
October 26		Chico State	A Street field; Davis, CA	W 21–3	
November 2		at Nevada	Mackay Stadium (Note: This stadium is the predecessor to the current Mackay Stadium, which was opened for the 1966 season.); Reno, NV	L 6–12	
November 9		San Francisco Junior College*	A Street field; Davis, CA	W 7–6	
November 16		Fresno State	A Street field; Davis, CA	L 6–32	
November 22		Pacific (CA)	A Street field; Davis, CA	L 0–26	
*Non-conference game; All times are in Pacific time
