= 1935 Loyola Lions football team =

American college football season

1935 Loyola Lions football
- Conference: Independent
- Record: 6–5
- Head coach: Tom Lieb (6th season)
- Home stadium: Gilmore Stadium

1935 Western college football independents records
	Conf.			Overall
Team	W	L	T	W		L		T
Idaho Southern Branch		–		7	–	0	–	1
Humboldt State		–		6	–	1	–	1
Cal Poly		–		5	–	2	–	1
Pomona		–		5	–	2	–	1
No. 23 Saint Mary's		–		5	–	2	–	2
Hawaii		–		5	–	3	–	0
San Francisco		–		5	–	3	–	0
Gonzaga		–		5	–	4	–	1
Loyola (CA)		–		6	–	5	–	0
San Jose State		–		5	–	5	–	1
Portland		–		3	–	4	–	0
Santa Clara		–		3	–	6	–	1
San Francisco State		–		2	–	5	–	1
Rankings from United Press

The 1935 Loyola Lions football team was an American football team that represented Loyola University of Los Angeles (now known as Loyola Marymount University) as an independent during the 1935 college football season. In their sixth season under head coach Tom Lieb, the Lions compiled a 6–5 record.

== Schedule ==
Date	Opponent	Site	Result	Attendance	Source
September 21	Caltech	Gilmore Stadium; Los Angeles, CA	W 52–6	7,000	
September 28	Redlands	Gilmore Stadium; Los Angeles, CA	L 18–19		
October 4	Whittier	Gilmore Stadium; Los Angeles, CA	W 33–0	18,000	
October 12	at Arizona State	Phoenix High School Stadium; Phoenix, AZ	W 7–3	5,000	
October 18	Arizona	Gilmore Stadium; Los Angeles, CA	W 13–6	17,000	
October 25	Texas Tech	Gilmore Stadium; Los Angeles, CA	W 16–0	18,000	
November 3	at San Francisco	Kezar Stadium; San Francisco, CA	L 0–9	7,000	
November 9	at San Diego State	Balboa Stadium; San Diego, CA	L 0–6		
November 16	Michigan State	Gilmore Stadium; Los Angeles, CA	L 0–27	9,000	
November 23	at UCLA	Los Angeles Memorial Coliseum; Los Angeles, CA	L 6–14	20,000	
December 1	Santa Clara	Gilmore Stadium; Los Angeles, CA	W 7–0	14,000	
