= Larry Lutz =

American football player and coach (1913–1998)

No. 25 – California Golden Bears
- Position: Tackle
- Class: Graduate

Personal information
- Born: 1913
- Died: 1998 (aged 84–85)

Career information
- College: California (1933–1935)

Awards and highlights
- Consensus All-American (1935); 2× First-team All-PCC (1933, 1935)

Lawrence H. Lutz (1913–1998) was an American football player and coach. He played for the California Golden Bears football team from 1933 and 1935. He was selected as a consensus All-American at the tackle position in 1935.

== Biography ==
A native of Santa Ana, California, Lutz played football for Santa Ana High School and was selected as the California high school player of the year in 1931. Lutz next enrolled at the University of California, Berkeley. He played tackle for the California Golden Bears as a sophomore in 1933 and as a senior in 1935. He was unable to play in 1934 due to an injury. As a senior in 1935, he was selected as a first-team All-American by the Associated Press, the All-America Board (a board made up of Glenn "Pop" Warner, Christy Walsh, Elmer Layden, Howard Jones and Frank Thomas), the Central Press Association (selected based on the votes of 53 college football captains), and the Walter Camp Football Foundation. He was named a second-team All-American by the United Press and is considered a consensus All-American. In selecting Lutz as an All-American, Associated Press sports editor Alan Gould wrote: "Lutz stood out among linemen on the coast, tackling fiercely and fast enough to draw out for interference when advantageous." At the end of the 1935 season, Lutz's teammates voted Lutz as the honorary captain of the 1935 team. Selected in the 1936 NFL draft, Lutz turned down an offer to play professional football with the Boston Redskins, opting to remain at the University of California as an assistant football coach working with head coach Stub Allison. Lutz also played for the Salinas Iceberg Packers from 1936 to 1937 and for the St. Mary's Pre-Flight Air Devils in 1942. Some accounts indicate he may have also played for the Calgary Bronks in the Canadian Rugby League.
