= 1935 USC Trojans football team =

American college football season

1935 USC Trojans football

Poi Bowl, W 38–6 vs. Hawaii
- Conference: Pacific Coast Conference
- Record: 5–7 (2–4 PCC)
- Head coach: Howard Jones (11th season)
- Captains: Art Dittberner; Cliff Propst
- Home stadium: Los Angeles Memorial Coliseum

1935 Pacific Coast Conference football standings
	Conf.					Overall
Team	W		L		T	W		L		T
No. 6 Stanford ^ +	4	–	1	–	0	8	–	1	–	0
No. 9 California +	4	–	1	–	0	9	–	1	–	0
No. 18 UCLA +	4	–	1	–	0	8	–	2	–	0
Washington State	3	–	2	–	0	5	–	3	–	1
Oregon	3	–	2	–	0	6	–	3	–	0
No. 23 Washington	4	–	3	–	0	5	–	3	–	0
Oregon State	2	–	3	–	1	6	–	4	–	1
USC	2	–	4	–	0	5	–	7	–	0
Idaho	1	–	5	–	0	2	–	7	–	0
Montana	0	–	5	–	1	1	–	5	–	2
+ – Conference co-champions; ^ – Selected as Rose Bowl representative; Rankings from United Press

The 1935 USC Trojans football team represented the University of Southern California (USC) in the 1935 college football season. In their 11th year under head coach Howard Jones, the Trojans compiled a 5–7 record (2–4 against conference opponents), finished in eighth place in the Pacific Coast Conference, and outscored their opponents by a combined total of 155 to 124.

== Schedule ==
Date	Opponent	Site	Result	Attendance	Source
September 28	Montana	Los Angeles Memorial Coliseum; Los Angeles, CA	W 9–0	30,000	
October 5	Pacific (CA)*	Los Angeles Memorial Coliseum; Los Angeles, CA	W 19–7	35,000	
October 12	Illinois*	Los Angeles Memorial Coliseum; Los Angeles, CA	L 0–19	60,000	
October 19	Oregon State	Los Angeles Memorial Coliseum; Los Angeles, CA	L 7–13	35,000	
October 26	at California	California Memorial Stadium; Berkeley, CA	L 7–21	48,000	
November 9	Stanford	Los Angeles Memorial Coliseum; Los Angeles, CA (rivalry)	L 0–3	50,000	
November 16	Washington State	Los Angeles Memorial Coliseum; Los Angeles, CA	W 20–10	40,000	
November 23	at Notre Dame*	Notre Dame Stadium; Notre Dame, IN (rivalry)	L 13–20	38,305–50,000	
December 7	Washington^{†}	Los Angeles Memorial Coliseum; Los Angeles, CA	L 2–6	45,000	
December 14	Pittsburgh*	Los Angeles Memorial Coliseum; Los Angeles, CA	L 7–12	35,000	
December 25	at Kamehameha High Alumni*	Honolulu Stadium; Honolulu, Territory of Hawaii	W 33–7	11,000	
January 1, 1936	at Hawaii*	Honolulu Stadium; Honolulu, Territory of Hawaii (Poi Bowl)	W 38–6	18,000	
*Non-conference game; ^{†}Homecoming; Source:
