= 1935 Gonzaga Bulldogs football team =

American college football season

1935 Gonzaga Bulldogs football
- Conference: Independent
- Record: 5–4–1
- Head coach: Mike Pecarovich (5th season)
- Home stadium: Gonzaga Stadium

1935 Western college football independents records
	Conf.			Overall
Team	W	L	T	W		L		T
Idaho Southern Branch		–		7	–	0	–	1
Humboldt State		–		6	–	1	–	1
Cal Poly		–		5	–	2	–	1
Pomona		–		5	–	2	–	1
No. 23 Saint Mary's		–		5	–	2	–	2
Hawaii		–		5	–	3	–	0
San Francisco		–		5	–	3	–	0
Gonzaga		–		5	–	4	–	1
Loyola (CA)		–		6	–	5	–	0
San Jose State		–		5	–	5	–	1
Portland		–		3	–	4	–	0
Santa Clara		–		3	–	6	–	1
San Francisco State		–		2	–	5	–	1
Rankings from United Press

The 1935 Gonzaga Bulldogs football team was an American football team that represented Gonzaga University during the 1935 college football season. In their fifth year under head coach Mike Pecarovich, the Bulldogs compiled a 5–4–1 record and outscored all opponents by a total of 125 to 109.

Fullback George Karamatic and halfback Ed Justice played for Gonzaga in 1935. Both later played years in the National Football League for the Washington Redskins and were inducted into the Gonzaga Athletic Hall of Fame.

== Schedule ==
Date	Opponent	Site	Result	Attendance	Source
September 21	Cheney Normal	Gonzaga Stadium; Spokane, WA	L 7–13		
September 28	at Oregon	Multnomah Stadium; Portland, OR	L 0–18		
October 5	Idaho	Gonzaga Stadium; Spokane, WA (rivalry)	W 7–6	7,000	
October 11	at Oregon State	Bell Field; Corvallis, OR	L 6–33		
October 19	San Francisco	Gonzaga Stadium; Spokane, WA	L 0–20	6,000	
October 26	Washburn	Gonzaga Stadium; Spokane, WA	W 21–0		
November 2	at Washington State	Rogers Field; Pullman, WA	W 7–0	5,000	
November 9	vs. Montana	Great Falls, MT	T 7–7	3,500	
November 16	Puget Sound	Gonzaga Stadium; Spokane, WA	W 50–12		
November 28	Portland	Gonzaga Stadium; Spokane, WA	W 20–0		
