= 1935 UCLA Bruins football team =

American college football season

1935 UCLA Bruins football

PCC co-champion
- Conference: Pacific Coast Conference
- Record: 8–2 (4–1 PCC)
- Head coach: William H. Spaulding (11th season)
- Home stadium: Los Angeles Memorial Coliseum

1935 Pacific Coast Conference football standings
	Conf.					Overall
Team	W		L		T	W		L		T
No. 6 Stanford ^ +	4	–	1	–	0	8	–	1	–	0
No. 9 California +	4	–	1	–	0	9	–	1	–	0
No. 18 UCLA +	4	–	1	–	0	8	–	2	–	0
Washington State	3	–	2	–	0	5	–	3	–	1
Oregon	3	–	2	–	0	6	–	3	–	0
No. 23 Washington	4	–	3	–	0	5	–	3	–	0
Oregon State	2	–	3	–	1	6	–	4	–	1
USC	2	–	4	–	0	5	–	7	–	0
Idaho	1	–	5	–	0	2	–	7	–	0
Montana	0	–	5	–	1	1	–	5	–	2
+ – Conference co-champions; ^ – Selected as Rose Bowl representative; Rankings from United Press

The 1935 UCLA Bruins football team was an American football team that represented the University of California, Los Angeles during the 1935 college football season. In their 11th year under head coach William H. Spaulding, the Bruins compiled an 8–2 record (4–1 conference) and finished in a three-way tie (with the California Golden Bears and Stanford Indians) for first place in the Pacific Coast Conference.

== Schedule ==
Date	Opponent	Site	Result	Attendance	Source
September 28	Utah State*	Los Angeles Memorial Coliseum; Los Angeles, CA	W 39–0	12,000	
October 5	vs. Oregon State	Multnomah Stadium; Portland, OR	W 20–7	10,000	
October 19	at Stanford	Stanford Stadium; Stanford, CA	W 7–6	25,000	
October 26	Oregon	Los Angeles Memorial Coliseum; Los Angeles, CA	W 33–6	25,000	
November 2	California	Los Angeles Memorial Coliseum; Los Angeles, CA (rivalry)	L 2–14	78,000	
November 9	SMU*	Los Angeles Memorial Coliseum; Los Angeles, CA	L 0–21	40,000–50,000	
November 15	Hawaii*	Los Angeles Memorial Coliseum; Los Angeles, CA	W 19–6	16,000	
November 23	Loyola (CA)*	Los Angeles Memorial Coliseum; Los Angeles, CA	W 14–6	20,000	
November 30	Idaho	Los Angeles Memorial Coliseum; Los Angeles, CA	W 13–6	5,000	
December 14	at Saint Mary's*	Kezar Stadium; San Francisco, CA	W 13–7	8,500	
*Non-conference game; Source:
