= 1935 Humboldt State Lumberjacks football team =

American college football season

1935 Humboldt State Lumberjacks football
- Conference: Independent
- Record: 6–1–1
- Head coach: Charles F. Erb (1st season)
- Home stadium: Albee Stadium

1935 Western college football independents records
	Conf.			Overall
Team	W	L	T	W		L		T
Idaho Southern Branch		–		7	–	0	–	1
Humboldt State		–		6	–	1	–	1
Cal Poly		–		5	–	2	–	1
Pomona		–		5	–	2	–	1
No. 23 Saint Mary's		–		5	–	2	–	2
Hawaii		–		5	–	3	–	0
San Francisco		–		5	–	3	–	0
Gonzaga		–		5	–	4	–	1
Loyola (CA)		–		6	–	5	–	0
San Jose State		–		5	–	5	–	1
Portland		–		3	–	4	–	0
Santa Clara		–		3	–	6	–	1
San Francisco State		–		2	–	5	–	1
Rankings from United Press

The 1935 Humboldt State Lumberjacks football team represented Humboldt State College—now known as California State Polytechnic University, Humboldt—as an independent during the 1935 college football season. Led by first-year head coach Charles F. Erb, the Lumberjacks compiled a record of 6–1–1 and outscored their opponents 134 to 44 for the season. The team played home games at Albee Stadium in Eureka, California.

== Schedule ==
Date	Opponent	Site	Result	Attendance	Source
September 21	San Francisco State	Albee Stadium; Eureka, CA	W 25–12		
September 28	Cardinal Athletic Club (Oakland, CA)	Albee Stadium; Eureka, CA	W 20–0		
October 4	Cal Aggies	Albee Stadium; Eureka, CA	W 19–0	5,000	
October 12	Santa Clara freshmen	Albee Stadium; Eureka, CA	W 14–7		
October 19	Chico State	Albee Stadium; Eureka, CA	W 19–0		
October 26	Saint Mary's freshmen	Albee Stadium; Eureka, CA	T 0–0		
November 8	Santa Rosa	Albee Stadium; Eureka, CA	W 31–0	2,500	
November 22	at San Jose State	Spartan Stadium; San Jose, CA	L 6–25		
