= 1977 Sun Bowl (December) =

American college football game

LSU Tigers	Stanford Cardinals
(8–3)	(8–3)
SEC	Pac-8
14	24
Head coach: Charles McClendon	Head coach: Bill Walsh
	1	2	3	4	Total
LSU	7	7	0	0	14
Stanford	0	10	7	7	24
- Date: December 31, 1977
- Season: 1977
- Stadium: Sun Bowl
- Location: El Paso, Texas
- MVP: Charles Alexander (RB), LSU; Gordy Ceresino (LB), Stanford
- Favorite: LSU by 3 points
- Referee: Donald Safrit (ACC)
- Attendance: 31,318

United States TV coverage
- Network: CBS
- Announcers: Pat Summerall (play-by-play), Tom Brookshier, Burt Reynolds

The 1977 Sun Bowl game was a post-season college football bowl game, part of the bowl schedule of the 1977 NCAA Division I football season. Played on Saturday, December 31, it matched the LSU Tigers of the Southeastern Conference and the Stanford Cardinals of the Pacific-8 Conference at the Sun Bowl in El Paso, Texas. It was the 44th edition of the Sun Bowl (43rd playing between collegiate teams).

LSU running back Charles Alexander ran for 197 yards and a first half touchdown, but Stanford's defense held the Tigers scoreless in the second half, and quarterback Guy Benjamin threw for 269 yards and three touchdowns on the day to lead the Cardinals to a 24–14 upset.

== Teams ==
=== Stanford Cardinals ===
Stanford finished the regular season tied for second place in the Pac-8 conference under first-year head coach Bill Walsh, and was making its first ever non-Rose Bowl postseason appearance. (The Pac-8 had not allowed multiple bowl teams until the 1975 season.) The Cardinals were noted for their pass-heavy offense, led by Sammy Baugh Trophy-award winning quarterback Guy Benjamin, wide receiver James Lofton, and freshman running back Darrin Nelson.

=== LSU Tigers ===
LSU finished third in the SEC behind long-time coach Charles McClendon. The Tigers were led by running back Charles Alexander, the number two rusher in college football behind Heisman Trophy winner Earl Campbell.

== Game summary ==
After holding Stanford on its first possession, LSU marched 80 yards in nine plays and scored on a short pass play. Stanford answered on a long pass from Benjamin to Lofton to tie the score and added a Ken Naber field goal to move ahead, 10–7. Just before halftime, LSU running back Alexander scored on a seven-yard run to retake the lead, giving him 123 yards for the half. He would end with 197 yards on the day, establishing a new Sun Bowl rushing record, surpassing Tony Dorsett's 142 yards. He was named the game's offensive most valuable player.

The second half was all Stanford. Benjamin threw two more touchdown passes, a short 2-yarder to Lofton and a 20-yard pass to Nelson. Benjamin ended the day 23 for 36 passing for 269 yards and three touchdowns, a Sun Bowl record. Lofton had 4 receptions for 79 yards and two touchdowns. Defensively, Stanford held LSU scoreless in the second half, and intercepted three passes. Linebacker Gordy Ceresino recorded 22 tackles to lead the Cardinals, and was named the game's defensive MVP.

=== Scoring ===
First quarter

- LSU - Mike Quintela 3-yard pass from Steve Ensminger (Mike Conway kick)

Second quarter

- Stanford - James Lofton 49-yard pass from Guy Benjamin (Ken Naber kick)
- Stanford - Naber 36-yard field goal
- LSU - Charles Alexander 7-yard run (Conway kick)

Third quarter

- Stanford - Lofton 2-yard pass from Benjamin (Naber kick)

Fourth quarter

- Stanford - Darrin Nelson 20-yard pass from Benjamin (Naber run)

== Aftermath ==
Walsh led Stanford to another bowl win the next season in the Astro-Bluebonnet Bowl, and then was hired as head coach of the NFL's San Francisco 49ers, eventually leading them to three Super Bowl titles in ten seasons. Stanford's football program slid after Walsh's departure, and they did not return to a bowl for eight years, at the 1986 Gator Bowl. Three years after retiring from the 49ers, Walsh returned to Stanford in 1992 and coached the Cardinal for three seasons and one bowl victory. Receiver Lofton played fifteen years in the NFL (mostly with the Green Bay Packers) and, like Walsh, is a member of the Pro Football Hall of Fame.

McClendon coached two more seasons for LSU, leading them to postseason appearances in the 1978 Liberty Bowl and 1979 Tangerine Bowl, and then retired from coaching. He was inducted into the College Football Hall of Fame in 1986. Alexander played for the Cincinnati Bengals in Super Bowl XVI against Walsh's 49ers and is best known for being stopped inches short of the goal by San Francisco linebacker Dan Bunz on a third down pass in the third quarter with the 49ers leading, 20-7. The Bengals were held scoreless on that drive when Pete Johnson was stuffed on fourth down, helping the 49ers go on to a 26-21 victory.
