= 1935 San Francisco State Staters football team =

American college football season

1935 San Francisco State Staters football
- Conference: Independent
- Record: 2–5–1
- Head coach: Dan Farmer & Hal Hardin (1st season)
- Home stadium: Ewing Field

1935 Western college football independents records
	Conf.			Overall
Team	W	L	T	W		L		T
Idaho Southern Branch		–		7	–	0	–	1
Humboldt State		–		6	–	1	–	1
Cal Poly		–		5	–	2	–	1
Pomona		–		5	–	2	–	1
No. 23 Saint Mary's		–		5	–	2	–	2
Hawaii		–		5	–	3	–	0
San Francisco		–		5	–	3	–	0
Gonzaga		–		5	–	4	–	1
Loyola (CA)		–		6	–	5	–	0
San Jose State		–		5	–	5	–	1
Portland		–		3	–	4	–	0
Santa Clara		–		3	–	6	–	1
San Francisco State		–		2	–	5	–	1
Rankings from United Press

The 1935 San Francisco State States football team represented San Francisco State College—now known as San Francisco State University—as an independent during the 1935 college football season. Led by first-year co-head coaches Dan Farmer and Hal Hardin, San Francisco State compiled a record of 2–5–1 and was outscored by its opponents 127 to 48. The team played home games at Ewing Field in San Francisco. Although the "Gator" was voted to be the mascot for the team in 1931, local newspaper articles called the team the "Staters" from 1935 through 1940.

== Schedule ==
Date	Opponent	Site	Result	Source
September 13	Marin	Kentfield, CA	L 8–26	
September 21	at Humboldt State	Albee Stadium; Eureka, CA	L 12–25	
September 28	at Menlo	Atherton, CA	W 12–6	
October 5	Chico State	Ewing Field; San Francisco, CA	L 0–24	
October 12	Mare Island Marines	Ewing Field; San Francisco, CA	T 2–2	
October 19	San Francisco Junior College	Kezar Stadium; San Francisco, CA	L 12–32	
October 26	Salinas	Ewing Field; San Francisco, CA	W 2–0	
November 1	San Mateo	Ewing Field; San Francisco, CA	Cancelled (rain)	
November 8	Santa Barbara State	Ewing Field; San Francisco, CA	L 0–12	
