= 1935 San Diego State Aztecs football team =

American college football season

1935 San Diego State Aztecs football
- Conference: Southern California Conference
- Record: 3–4–1 (2–2–1 SCC)
- Head coach: Leo Calland (1st season)
- Home stadium: Balboa Stadium; Aztec Field

1935 Southern California Conference football standings
	Conf.					Overall
Team	W		L		T	W		L		T
Whittier $	4	–	1	–	0	5	–	5	–	0
Redlands	3	–	1	–	1	7	–	1	–	1
Santa Barbara State	2	–	2	–	1	5	–	2	–	2
San Diego State	2	–	2	–	1	3	–	4	–	1
Occidental	1	–	2	–	1	3	–	3	–	2
La Verne	0	–	4	–	0	3	–	6	–	1
$ – Conference champion

The 1935 San Diego State Aztecs football team represented San Diego State College (Note: San Diego State University was known as San Diego State College from 1935 to 1971.) during the 1935 college football season.

San Diego State competed in the Southern California Intercollegiate Athletic Conference (SCIAC). The 1935 San Diego State team was led by head coach Leo B. Calland in his first season with the Aztecs. They played home games at Balboa Stadium in San Diego, California and one game on campus. The Aztecs finished the season with three wins, four losses and one tie (3–4–1, 2–2–1 SCIAC). Overall, the team was outscored by its opponents 56–83 points for the season.

== Schedule ==
Date	Opponent	Site	Result	Attendance	Source
October 5	Santa Barbara State	Aztec Field; San Diego, CA	T 7–7		
October 12	Occidental	Balboa Stadium; San Diego, CA	L 0–7	3,000	
October 19	La Verne	Balboa Stadium; San Diego, CA	W 14–6		
October 25	at Whittier	Hadley Field; Whittier, CA	L 0–13		
November 9	Loyola (CA)*	Balboa Stadium; San Diego, CA	W 6–0		
November 16	Redlands	Balboa Stadium; San Diego, CA	W 13–7		
November 28	at San Jose State*	Spartan Stadium; San Jose, CA	L 9–24	5,000	
December 7	Pacific (CA)*	Balboa Stadium; San Diego, CA	L 7–19	4,200	
*Non-conference game
