= 1935 Oregon Webfoots football team =

American college football season

1935 Oregon Webfoots football
- Conference: Pacific Coast Conference
- Record: 6–3 (3–2 PCC)
- Head coach: Prink Callison (4th season)
- Captain: Ross Carter
- Home stadium: Hayward Field

1935 Pacific Coast Conference football standings
| | Conf. | | | | | Overall |
| Team | W | | L | | T | W | | L | | T |
|---|---|---|---|---|---|---|---|---|---|---|
| No. 6 Stanford ^ + | 4 | – | 1 | – | 0 | 8 | – | 1 | – | 0 |
| No. 9 California + | 4 | – | 1 | – | 0 | 9 | – | 1 | – | 0 |
| No. 18 UCLA + | 4 | – | 1 | – | 0 | 8 | – | 2 | – | 0 |
| Washington State | 3 | – | 2 | – | 0 | 5 | – | 3 | – | 1 |
| Oregon | 3 | – | 2 | – | 0 | 6 | – | 3 | – | 0 |
| No. 23 Washington | 4 | – | 3 | – | 0 | 5 | – | 3 | – | 0 |
| Oregon State | 2 | – | 3 | – | 1 | 6 | – | 4 | – | 1 |
| USC | 2 | – | 4 | – | 0 | 5 | – | 7 | – | 0 |
| Idaho | 1 | – | 5 | – | 0 | 2 | – | 7 | – | 0 |
| Montana | 0 | – | 5 | – | 1 | 1 | – | 5 | – | 2 |
+ – Conference co-champions; ^ – Selected as Rose Bowl representative; Rankings from United Press

The 1935 Oregon Webfoots football team represented the University of Oregon in the Pacific Coast Conference (PCC) during the 1935 college football season. In their fourth season under head coach Prink Callison, the Webfoots compiled a 6–3 record (3–2 against PCC opponents), finished in a tie for fourth place in the PCC, and outscored their opponents, 70 to 63. The team played its home games at Hayward Field in Eugene, Oregon.

== Schedule ==
| Date | Opponent | Site | Result | Attendance | Source |
|---|---|---|---|---|---|
| September 28 | Gonzaga* | Multnomah Stadium; Portland, OR | W 18–0 | 8,000 | |
| October 5 | Utah* | Hayward Field; Eugene, OR | W 6–0 | 8,000 | |
| October 12 | California | Multnomah Stadium; Portland, OR | L 0–6 | | |
| October 19 | Idaho | Hayward Field; Eugene, OR | W 14–0 | 7,500 | |
| October 26 | at UCLA | Los Angeles Memorial Coliseum; Los Angeles, CA | L 6–33 | 25,000 | |
| November 9 | Oregon State^{†} | Hayward Field; Eugene, OR (rivalry) | W 13–0 | 16,000 | |
| November 16 | at Portland* | Multnomah Stadium; Portland, OR | W 6–0 | | |
| November 23 | at Washington | Husky Stadium; Seattle, WA (rivalry) | W 7–6 | 20,992 | |
| December 7 | at Saint Mary's (CA)* | Kezar Stadium; San Francisco, CA (Governors' Trophy Game) | L 0–18 | 15,000 | |
*Non-conference game; ^{†}Homecoming; Source:
