= William H. Spaulding =

American football player and sports coach (1880–1966)

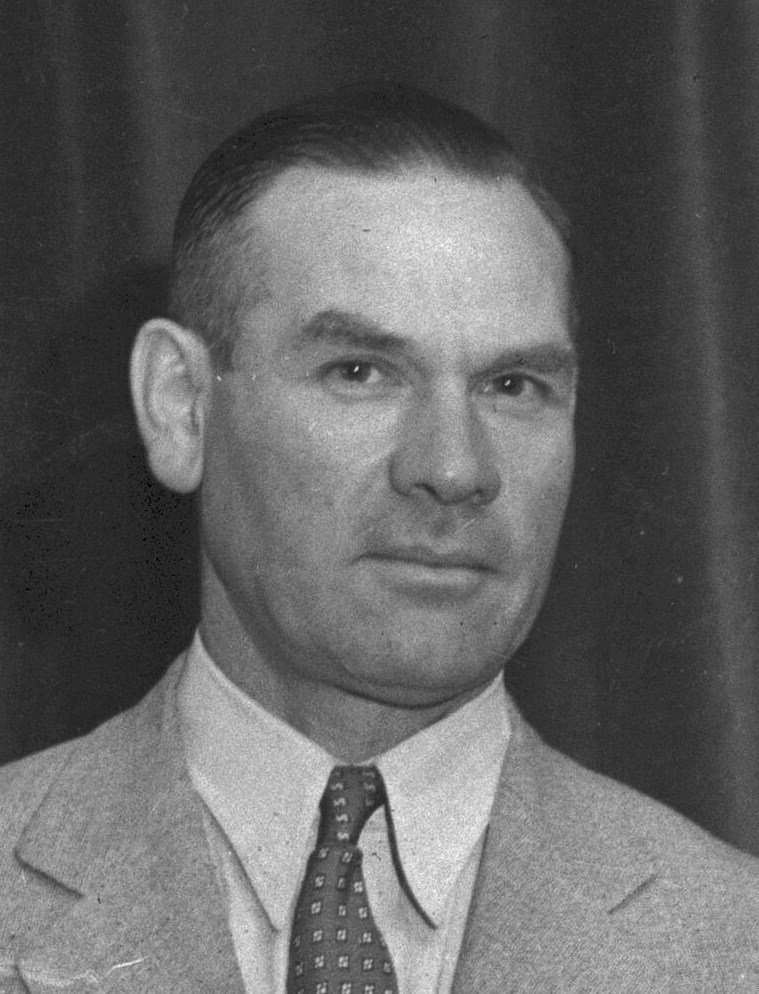
- Spaulding, c. 1936

Biographical details
- Born: May 4, 1880; Melrose, Wisconsin, U.S.
- Died: October 12, 1966 (aged 86); Los Angeles, California, U.S.

Playing career

Football
- 1903–1906: Wabash
- Position: Halfback

Coaching career (HC unless noted)

Football
- 1907–1921: Western State Normal
- 1922–1924: Minnesota
- 1925–1938: Southern Branch / UCLA

Basketball
- 1913–1922: Western State Normal

Baseball
- 1911–1921: Western State Normal

Administrative career (AD unless noted)
- 1938–1947: UCLA

Head coaching record
- Overall: 145–83–15 (football); 77–43 (basketball); 63–18–4 (baseball)
- Bowls: 1–0

Accomplishments and honors

Championships
- Football; 1 PCC (1935)

William H. Spaulding (May 4, 1880 – October 12, 1966) was an American football player and coach of football, basketball, and baseball. Spaulding coached at UCLA from 1925 to 1938. He had a successful tenure, compiling a 72–51–8 (.580) record. He also served as the head football coach at the University of Minnesota from 1922 to 1924. His record there was 11–7–4 (.591). He succeeded the legendary football coach Henry L. Williams. Prior to coaching at Minnesota he coached Western State Normal School (now known as Western Michigan University) from 1907 to 1921. Spaulding was the head football, basketball and baseball at Western State Normal. Spaulding attended Wabash College, where he played college football. In 1984, he was inducted into the Wabash College Athletic Hall of Fame.

== Early years ==
Spaulding was born in Melrose, Wisconsin, in 1880. He attended Wabash College in Crawfordsville, Indiana, where he played halfback for the football team and ran sprints for the track team. He was a member of the 1905 Wabash Little Giants football team that defeated Notre Dame.

In 1906, Spaulding briefly played professional football on Willie Heston's All Stars.

== Coaching and administrative career ==
=== Western State ===
In 1907, Spaulding was hired as the first coach and physical training director at Western State Normal School (later renamed Western Michigan University).

He was the head coach of the school's football team for 15 years from 1907 to 1921, compiling a 62–25–3 (.706) record. He is still the winningest coach in school history, though he is presently tied on the Broncos' all-time wins list with Al Molde. His players at Western State included Frank Thomas who went on to be the head coach of the Alabama Crimson Tide football team from 1931 to 1946.

He was the head coach for the Western State Normal School men's basketball program from 1913 through 1922, compiling a 77–43 (.642) record, and finishing .500 or higher in each of his nine seasons.

He was also the head coach for Western State's baseball program from 1911 through 1921, compiling a 63–18–4 (.765) record.

=== Minnesota ===
In January 1922, Spaulding was hired by the University of Minnesota to replace Henry L. Williams as the school's head football coach. He was hired at a salary of $5,500 per year. In 1924, Spaulding's Golden Gophers stopped Red Grange and handed Illinois its only defeat of the 1924 season.

=== UCLA ===
In May 1925, Spaulding was hired by the University of California Southern Branch (later renamed UCLA) as its head football coach and athletic director. He signed a five-year contract with Southern Branch at a salary of $10,000 per year.

Spaulding's 1935 UCLA team was a Pacific Coast Conference co-champion and handed Stanford's "Vow Boys" team its only defeat of the 1935 season. Spaulding later described the 1935 victory over Stanford as the greatest thrill of his career. His players at UCLA included Kenny Washington and Jackie Robinson. In 11 years as UCLA's head football coach, his teams compiled a record of 72–51–8

In February 1938, Spaulding announced that he would resign as UCLA's head football coach after the 1938 season. He had also assumed the role as UCLA's athletic director and stated that he would thereafter confine himself to those duties.

Spaulding remained at UCLA as athletic director from 1938 to 1947. After 22 years at UCLA, Spaulding resigned in March 1947, indicating that he intended to go into business.

== Later years ==
Spaulding and his wife, Jess, had a son, William E. Spaulding, and three daughters, Jane, Frances, and Barbara. His wife died in 1953. He later remarried to a second wife, Eleanor.

Spaulding died in 1966 at age 86 at the Elizabeth Manor Sanitarium in Los Angeles. He had been ill and in "a virtual coma" for several years before his death.

== Head coaching record ==
=== Football ===
Year	Team	Overall	Conference	Standing	Bowl/playoffs
Western State Normal Hilltoppers (Independent) (1907–1921)
1907	Western State Normal	3–2–1			
1908	Western State Normal	3–3			
1909	Western State Normal	7–0			
1910	Western State Normal	4–1–1			
1911	Western State Normal	2–3			
1912	Western State Normal	3–2–1			
1913	Western State Normal	4–0			
1914	Western State Normal	6–0			
1915	Western State Normal	5–1			
1916	Western State Normal	5–1			
1917	Western State Normal	4–3			
1918	Western State Normal	3–2			
1919	Western State Normal	4–1			
1920	Western State Normal	3–4			
1921	Western State Normal	6–2			
Western State Normal:		62–25–3			
Minnesota Golden Gophers (Big Ten Conference) (1922–1924)
1922	Minnesota	3–3–1	2–3–1	5th	
1923	Minnesota	5–1–1	2–1–1	4th	
1924	Minnesota	3–3–2	1–2–1	6th	
Minnesota:		11–7–4	5–6–3		
Southern Branch / UCLA Grizzlies (Southern California Intercollegiate Athletic Conference) (1925–1927)
1925	Southern Branch	5–3–1	3–1–1	2nd	
1926	Southern Branch	5–3	4–2	2nd	
1927	UCLA	6–2–1	4–0–1	2nd	
UCLA Bruins (Pacific Coast Conference) (1928–1938)
1928	UCLA	4–4–1	0–4	T–9th	
1929	UCLA	4–4	1–3	6th	
1930	UCLA	3–5	1–4	T–8th	
1931	UCLA	3–4–1	0–3	T–9th	
1932	UCLA	6–4	4–2	3rd	
1933	UCLA	6–4–1	1–3–1	8th	
1934	UCLA	7–3	2–3	6th	
1935	UCLA	8–2	4–1	T–1st	
1936	UCLA	6–3–1	4–3–1	4th	
1937	UCLA	2–6–1	1–5–1	9th	
1938	UCLA	7–4–1	4–3–1	T–3rd	W Poi
UCLA:		72–51–8	33–34–6		
Total:		145–83–15			
National championship Conference title Conference division title or championship game berth

=== Basketball ===
Record table
Season	Team	Overall	Postseason
Western State Normal Hilltoppers (1913–1922)
1913–14	Western State Normal	4–4	
1914–15	Western State Normal	7–5	
1915–16	Western State Normal	9–7	
1916–17	Western State Normal	7–6	
1917–18	Western State Normal	8–4	
1918–19	Western State Normal	11–3	
1919–20	Western State Normal	8–3	
1920–21	Western State Normal	12–5	
1921–22	Western State Normal	11–6	
Total:		77–43	
