= Bill Walsh =

American football coach (1931–2007)

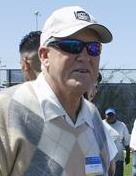
- Walsh at San Jose State University in 2007

Personal information
- Born: November 30, 1931; Los Angeles, California, U.S.
- Died: July 30, 2007 (aged 75); Woodside, California, U.S.

Career information
- High school: Hayward (CA)
- College: San Jose State

Career history

Coaching
- Washington HS (CA) (1957–1959) Head coach; California (1960–1962) Receivers coach; Stanford (1963–1965) Defensive backs coach; Oakland Raiders (1966) Running backs coach; San Jose Apaches (1967) Head coach; Cincinnati Bengals (1968–1975) Assistant coach; San Diego Chargers (1976) Offensive coordinator; Stanford (1977–1978) Head coach; San Francisco 49ers (1979–1988) Head coach; Stanford (1992–1994) Head coach

Operations
- San Francisco 49ers (1979–1982) General manager; San Francisco 49ers (1983–1987) President; San Francisco 49ers (1999–2000) Vice president and general manager; San Francisco 49ers (2002–2004) Consultant

Awards and highlights
- 3× Super Bowl champion (XVI, XIX, XXIII); AP NFL Coach of the Year (1981); 2× 101 Awards NFC Coach of the Year (1981, 1984); 2× UPI NFC Coach of the Year (1981, 1984); NFL 1980s All-Decade Team; NFL 100th Anniversary All-Time Team; San Francisco 49ers Hall of Fame; Pac-8 Coach of the Year (1977); Amos Alonzo Stagg Award (2008)

Head coaching record
- Regular season: NFL: 92–59–1 (.609); NCAA: 34–24–1 (.585)
- Postseason: 10–4 (.714)
- Career: NFL: 102–63–1 (.617); NCAA: 34–24–1 (.585)
- Coaching profile at Pro Football Reference
- Pro Football Hall of Fame

William Ernest Walsh (November 30, 1931 – July 30, 2007) was an American professional and college football coach. He served as head coach of the San Francisco 49ers and the Stanford Cardinal, during which time he popularized the West Coast offense. After retiring from the 49ers, Walsh worked as a sports broadcaster for several years and then returned as head coach at Stanford for three seasons.

Walsh went 102–63–1 (wins-losses-ties) with the 49ers, winning 10 of his 14 postseason games along with six division titles, three NFC Championship titles, and three Super Bowls. He was named NFL Coach of the Year in 1981 and 1984. In 1993, he was elected to the Pro Football Hall of Fame. He is widely considered amongst the greatest coaches in NFL history.

== Early life ==
Walsh was born in Los Angeles. He attended Hayward High School in Hayward in the San Francisco Bay Area, where he played running back. Walsh played quarterback at the College of San Mateo for two seasons. (Both John Madden and Walsh played and coached at the College of San Mateo early in their careers.) After playing at the College of San Mateo, Walsh transferred to San José State University, where he played tight end and defensive end. He also participated in intercollegiate boxing, winning the golden glove.

Walsh graduated from San Jose State with a bachelor's degree in physical education in 1955. After two years in the U.S. Army participating on their boxing team, Walsh built a championship team at Washington High School in Fremont before becoming an assistant coach at Cal, Stanford and then the Oakland Raiders in 1966.

== College coaching career ==
He served under Bob Bronzan as a graduate assistant coach on the Spartans football coaching staff and graduated with a master's degree in physical education from San Jose State in 1959. His master's thesis was entitled Flank Formation Football -- Stress: Defense. Thesis 796.W228f.

Following graduation, Walsh coached the football and swim teams at Washington High School in Fremont, California. While there he interviewed for an assistant coaching position with the new head coach of the University of California, Berkeley California Golden Bears football team, Marv Levy.

"I was very impressed, individually, by his knowledge, by his intelligence, by his personality, and hired him," Levy said. Levy and Walsh, two future NFL Hall of Famers, would never produce a winning season for the Golden Bears.

Leaving Berkeley, Walsh did a stint at Stanford University as an assistant coach of its Cardinal football team before beginning his pro coaching career.

== Professional coaching career ==
=== Early years ===
Walsh began his pro coaching career in 1966 as an assistant with the AFL's Oakland Raiders. There he was versed in the downfield-oriented "vertical" passing offense favored by Al Davis, an acolyte of Sid Gillman.

Walsh left the Raiders the next year to become the head coach and general manager of the San Jose Apaches of the Continental Football League (CFL). He led the Apaches to second place in the Pacific Division, but the team ceased all football operations prior to the start of the 1968 CFL season.

In 1968, Walsh joined the staff of head coach Paul Brown of the AFL expansion Cincinnati Bengals, where he coached wide receivers from 1968 to 1970. It was there that Walsh developed the philosophy now known as the "West Coast offense". Cincinnati's new quarterback, Virgil Carter, was known for his great mobility and accuracy but lacked a strong arm necessary to throw deep passes. To suit his strengths, Walsh suggested a modification of the downfield based "vertical passing scheme" he had learned during his time with the Raiders with one featuring a "horizontal" approach that relied on quick, short throws, often spreading the ball across the entire width of the field. In 1971 Walsh was given the additional responsibility of coaching the quarterbacks, and Carter went on to lead the league in pass completion percentage.

Ken Anderson eventually replaced Carter as starting quarterback, and, together with star wide receiver Isaac Curtis, produced a consistent, effective offensive attack.

When Brown retired as head coach following the 1975 season and appointed Bill "Tiger" Johnson as his successor, Walsh resigned and served as an assistant coach in 1976 for the San Diego Chargers under head coach Tommy Prothro. In a 2006 interview, Walsh claimed that during his tenure with the Bengals, Brown "worked against my candidacy" to be a head coach anywhere in the league. "All the way through I had opportunities, and I never knew about them", Walsh said. "And then when I left him, he called whoever he thought was necessary to keep me out of the NFL." Walsh also claimed that Brown kept talking him down any time Brown was called by NFL teams considering hiring Walsh as a head coach.

In 1977, Walsh was hired by Stanford University as the head coach of its Cardinal football team, where he stayed for two seasons. He was quite successful, with his teams posting a 9–3 record in 1977 with a win in the Sun Bowl, and going 8–4 in 1978 with a win in the Bluebonnet Bowl. His notable players at Stanford included quarterbacks Guy Benjamin, Steve Dils, wide receivers James Lofton and Ken Margerum, linebacker Gordy Ceresino, and running back Darrin Nelson. Walsh was the Pac-8 Conference Coach of the Year in 1977.

=== 49ers head coach ===
On January 9, 1979, Walsh resigned as head coach at Stanford, and San Francisco 49ers team owner Edward J. DeBartolo, Jr. fired head coach Fred O'Connor and general manager Joe Thomas following a 2–14 in 1978 season. Walsh was appointed head coach of the 49ers the next day.

The 49ers went 2–14 again in 1979. Hidden behind that record were organizational changes made by Walsh that set the team on a better course, including selecting Notre Dame quarterback Joe Montana in the third round of the 1979 NFL draft.

In 1980, starting quarterback Steve DeBerg got the 49ers off to a 3–0 start, but after a week 6 blowout loss to the Dallas Cowboys by a score of 59–14, Walsh gave Montana a chance to start. On December 7 versus the New Orleans Saints, the second-year player brought the 49ers back from a 35–7 halftime deficit to a 38–35 overtime win. In spite of this switch, the team struggled to a 6–10 finish – a record that belied a championship team in the making.

==== 1981 championship ====
In 1981, Walsh's efforts as head coach led the team to a 13–3 regular season. The 13 wins were a franchise record at the time, and were three more than they had won in the previous three seasons combined. Key victories were two wins each over the Los Angeles Rams and the Dallas Cowboys. The Rams were only two seasons removed from a Super Bowl appearance, and had dominated the series with the 49ers since 1967, winning 23, losing 3 and tying 1. San Francisco's two wins over the Rams in 1981 marked the shift of dominance in favor of the 49ers that lasted until 1998 with 30 wins (including 17 consecutively) against only 6 defeats. The 49ers blew out the Cowboys in week 6 of the regular season. On Monday Night Football that week, the win was not included in the halftime highlights. Walsh felt that this was because the Cowboys were scheduled to play the Rams the next week in a Sunday night game and that showing the highlights of the 49ers' win would potentially hurt the game's ratings. However, Walsh used this as a motivating factor for his team, who felt they were disrespected.

The 49ers faced the Cowboys again in the NFC title game. The contest was very close, and in the fourth quarter Walsh called a series of running plays as the 49ers marched down the field against the Cowboys' prevent defense, which had been expecting the 49ers to mainly pass. The 49ers came from behind to win the game on Joe Montana's pass completion to Dwight Clark for a touchdown, a play that came to be known simply as The Catch, propelling Walsh to his first appearance in a Super Bowl. Walsh would later write that the 49ers' two wins over the Rams showed a shift of power in their division, while the wins over the Cowboys showed a shift of power in the conference.

Two weeks later, on January 24, 1982, San Francisco faced the Cincinnati Bengals in Super Bowl XVI, winning 26–21 for the team's first NFL championship. Only a year removed from back-to-back two-win seasons, the 49ers had risen from the cellar to the top of the NFL in just two seasons. What came to be known as the West Coast offense developed by Walsh had proven a winner.

In all, Walsh served as 49ers head coach for 10 years, winning three Super Bowl championships, in the 1981, 1984, and 1988 seasons, and establishing a new NFL record.

Walsh had a disciplined approach to game-planning, famously scripting the first 10–15 offensive plays before the start of each game. His innovative play calling and design earned him the nickname "The Genius". In the ten-year span under Walsh, San Francisco scored 3,714 points (24.4 per game), the most of any team in the league.

In addition to Joe Montana, Walsh drafted Ronnie Lott, Charles Haley, and Jerry Rice, each one going on to the Pro Football Hall of Fame. He also traded a 2nd and 4th round pick in the 1987 draft for Steve Young, who took over from Montana, led the team to Super Bowl success, and was enshrined in Canton after his playing career. Walsh's success at every level of football, especially with the 49ers, earned him his own ticket to Canton in 1993.

On January 22, 1989, Walsh coached his final game with the 49ers, the memorable Super Bowl XXIII in which San Francisco beat Cincinnati 20–16. Walsh resigned as the 49ers head coach after the game. Walsh admitted years later that he immediately regretted the decision saying that he left too soon.

=== Coaching tree ===
==== Upline ====
Walsh's upline coaching tree included working as assistant for American Football League great and Hall of Fame head coach Al Davis and NFL legend and Hall of Famer Paul Brown, and, through Davis, AFL great and Hall of Fame head coach Sid Gillman of the then AFL Los Angeles/San Diego Chargers.

==== Downline ====

Tree updated through December 9, 2015.

Many Walsh assistants went on to become head coaches, including George Seifert, Mike Holmgren, Ray Rhodes, and Dennis Green. Seifert succeeded Walsh as 49ers head coach, and guided San Francisco to victories in Super Bowl XXIV and Super Bowl XXIX. Holmgren won a Super Bowl with the Green Bay Packers, and made 3 Super Bowl appearances as a head coach: 2 with the Packers, and another with the Seattle Seahawks. These coaches in turn have their own disciples who have used Walsh's West Coast system, such as former Denver Broncos head coach Mike Shanahan and former Houston Texans head coach Gary Kubiak. Mike Shanahan was an offensive coordinator under George Seifert and went on to win Super Bowl XXXII and Super Bowl XXXIII during his time as head coach of the Denver Broncos. Kubiak was first a quarterback coach with the 49ers, and then offensive coordinator for Shanahan with the Broncos. In 2015, he became the Broncos' head coach and led Denver to victory in Super Bowl 50. Dennis Green trained Tony Dungy, who won a Super Bowl with the Indianapolis Colts, and Brian Billick with his brother-in-law and linebackers coach Mike Smith. Billick won a Super Bowl as head coach of the Baltimore Ravens.

Mike Holmgren trained many of his assistants to become head coaches, including Jon Gruden and Andy Reid. Gruden won a Super Bowl with the Tampa Bay Buccaneers. Reid served as head coach of the Philadelphia Eagles from 1999 to 2012, and guided the Eagles to multiple winning seasons and numerous playoff appearances, including 1 Super Bowl appearance. Ever since 2013, Reid has served as head coach of the Kansas City Chiefs. He was finally able to win a Super Bowl, when his Chiefs defeated the San Francisco 49ers in Super Bowl LIV, and two consecutive when his Chiefs defeated the Eagles in Super Bowl LVII and the San Francisco 49ers in Super Bowl LVIII. In addition to this, Marc Trestman, former head coach of the Chicago Bears, served as offensive coordinator under Seifert in the 90's. Gruden himself would train Mike Tomlin, who led the Pittsburgh Steelers to their sixth Super Bowl championship, and Jim Harbaugh, whose 49ers would face his brother, John Harbaugh, whom Reid himself trained, and the Baltimore Ravens at Super Bowl XLVII, which marked the Ravens' second World Championship.

Bill Walsh was viewed as a strong advocate for African-American head coaches in the NFL and NCAA. Thus, the impact of Walsh also changed the NFL into an equal opportunity for African-American coaches. Along with Ray Rhodes and Dennis Green, Tyrone Willingham became the head coach at Stanford, then later Notre Dame and Washington. One of Mike Shanahan's assistants, Karl Dorrell, went on to be the head coach at UCLA. Walsh directly helped propel Dennis Green into the NFL head coaching ranks by offering to take on the head coaching job at Stanford.

=== Later years ===
After leaving the coaching ranks immediately following his team's victory in Super Bowl XXIII, Walsh went to work as a broadcaster for NBC, teaming with Dick Enberg to form the lead broadcasting team, replacing Merlin Olsen.

During his time with NBC, rumors began to surface that Walsh would coach again in the NFL. There were at least two known instances.

First, according to a February 2015 article by Mike Florio of NBC Sports, after a 5–11 season in 1989, the Patriots fired Raymond Berry and unsuccessfully attempted to lure Walsh to Foxborough to become head coach and general manager. When that failed, New England promoted defensive coordinator Rod Rust; the team split its first two games and then lost 14 straight in 1990.

Second, late in the 1990 season, Walsh was rumored to become Tampa Bay's next head coach and general manager after the team fired Ray Perkins and promoted Richard Williamson on an interim basis. Part of the speculation was fueled by the fact that Walsh's contract with NBC, which ran for 1989 and 1990, would soon be up for renewal, to say nothing of the pressure Hugh Culverhouse faced to increase fan support and to fill the seats at Tampa Stadium. However, less than a week after Super Bowl XXV, Walsh not only declined Tampa Bay's offer, but he and NBC agreed on a contract extension. Walsh would continue in his role with NBC for 1991. Meanwhile, after unsuccessfully courting then-recently fired Eagles coach Buddy Ryan or Giants then-defensive coordinator Bill Belichick to man the sidelines for Tampa Bay in 1991, the Bucs stuck with Williamson. Under Williamson's leadership, Tampa Bay won only three games in 1991.

On January 15, 1992, Walsh agreed to return to Stanford to serve as their head coach with a five-year contract with an annual salary of $350,000 to replace Dennis Green; he immediately named Terry Shea as offensive coordinator. That year, he led the Cardinal to a 10–3 record and a Pacific-10 Conference co-championship; it was the first conference championship for the program since 1971. Stanford finished the season with a victory over Penn State in the Blockbuster Bowl on January 1, 1993, and a #9 ranking in the final AP Poll. In November 1994, after consecutive losing seasons, Walsh left Stanford and retired from coaching.

In 1996, Walsh returned to the 49ers as an administrative aide. Walsh was the vice president and general manager for the 49ers from 1999 to 2001 and was a special consultant to the team for three years afterwards.

In 2004, Walsh was appointed as special assistant to the athletic director at Stanford. In 2005, after then-athletic director Ted Leland stepped down, Walsh was named interim athletic director. He also acted as a consultant for his alma mater San Jose State University in their search for an athletic director and Head Football Coach in 2005.

Walsh was also the author of three books, a motivational speaker, and taught classes at the Stanford Graduate School of Business.

Walsh was a board member for the Lott IMPACT Trophy, which is named after Pro Football Hall of Fame defensive back Ronnie Lott, and is awarded annually to college football's Defensive IMPACT Player of the Year. Walsh served as a keynote speaker at the award's banquet.

== Awards and honors ==
- 1989 – Golden Plate Award of the American Academy of Achievement
- 1993 – Pro Football Hall of Fame
- 1998 – San Jose State Hall of Fame and the SJSU Tower Award, the highest award given by SJSU

== Personal life ==
Walsh married his college sweetheart Geri, and had 3 children, Steve, Craig and Elizabeth.

== Death ==
Bill Walsh died of leukemia on July 30, 2007, at his home in Woodside, California.

Following Walsh's death, the playing field at the former Candlestick Park was renamed "Bill Walsh Field". Additionally, the regular San Jose State versus Stanford football game was renamed the "Bill Walsh Legacy Game". Super Bowl XLII was also dedicated to Walsh's memory; at the end of the player introduction ceremonies, his son, Craig, accompanied by Ronnie Lott, Jerry Rice and Steve Young, performed the ceremonial coin toss with New York Giants captain Michael Strahan.

== Head coaching record ==
=== College ===
Year	Team	Overall	Conference	Standing	Bowl/playoffs	Coaches^{#}	AP^{°}
Stanford Cardinal (Pacific-8/Pacific-10 Conference) (1977–1978)
1977	Stanford	9–3	5–2	T–2nd	W Sun	15	15
1978	Stanford	8–4	4–3	T–4th	W Astro-Bluebonnet	16	17
Stanford Cardinal (Pacific-10 Conference) (1992–1994)
1992	Stanford	10–3	6–2	T–1st	W Blockbuster^{†}	9	9
1993	Stanford	4–7	2–6	T–8th			
1994	Stanford	3–7–1	2–6	T–8th			
Stanford:		34–24–1	19–19				
Total:		34–24–1					
National championship Conference title Conference division title or championship game berth
^{†}Indicates Bowl Coalition bowl.; ^{#}Rankings from final Coaches Poll.; ^{°}Rankings from final AP Poll.

=== NFL ===
Team	Year	Regular season					Postseason			
Team	Year	Won	Lost	Ties	Win %	Finish	Won	Lost	Win %	Result
SF	1979	2	14	0	.125	4th in NFC West	—	—	—	—
SF	1980	6	10	0	.375	3rd in NFC West	—	—	—	—
SF	1981	13	3	0	.812	1st in NFC West	3	0	1.000	Super Bowl XVI champions
SF	1982	3	6	0	.333	11th in NFC	—	—	—	—
SF	1983	10	6	0	.625	1st in NFC West	1	1	.500	Lost to Washington Redskins in NFC Championship Game
SF	1984	15	1	0	.938	1st in NFC West	3	0	1.000	Super Bowl XIX champions
SF	1985	10	6	0	.625	2nd in NFC West	0	1	.000	Lost to New York Giants in NFC Wild Card Game
SF	1986	10	5	1	.656	1st in NFC West	0	1	.000	Lost to New York Giants in NFC Divisional Game
SF	1987	13	2	0	.867	1st in NFC West	0	1	.000	Lost to Minnesota Vikings in NFC Divisional Game
SF	1988	10	6	0	.625	1st in NFC West	3	0	1.000	Super Bowl XXIII champions
SF Total		92	59	1	.609		10	4	.714	
Total		92	59	1	.609		10	4	.714	

== Books ==
- Bill Walsh and Glenn Dickey, Building a Champion: On Football and the Making of the 49ers. St Martin's Press, 1990. (ISBN 0-312-04969-2).
- Bill Walsh, Brian Billick and James A. Peterson, Finding the Winning Edge. Sports Publishing, 1998. (ISBN 1-571-67172-2).
- Bill Walsh with Steve Jamison and Craig Walsh, The Score Takes Care of Itself: My Philosophy of Leadership. Penguin Group Publishing, 2009 (ISBN 978-1-59184-266-8).

== See also ==
- Bill Walsh College Football, a 1993 video game
- Bill Walsh College Football '95, a 1994 video game
- List of Super Bowl head coaches

Preceded by Merlin Olsen	NFL on NBC lead analyst 1989–1991	Succeeded by Bob Trumpy
