= 1935 Montana Grizzlies football team =

American college football season

1935 Montana Grizzlies football
- Conference: Pacific Coast Conference
- Record: 1–5–2 (0–5–1 PCC)
- Head coach: Doug Fessenden (1st season)
- Home stadium: Dornblaser Field

1935 Pacific Coast Conference football standings
	Conf.					Overall
Team	W		L		T	W		L		T
No. 6 Stanford ^ +	4	–	1	–	0	8	–	1	–	0
No. 9 California +	4	–	1	–	0	9	–	1	–	0
No. 18 UCLA +	4	–	1	–	0	8	–	2	–	0
Washington State	3	–	2	–	0	5	–	3	–	1
Oregon	3	–	2	–	0	6	–	3	–	0
No. 23 Washington	4	–	3	–	0	5	–	3	–	0
Oregon State	2	–	3	–	1	6	–	4	–	1
USC	2	–	4	–	0	5	–	7	–	0
Idaho	1	–	5	–	0	2	–	7	–	0
Montana	0	–	5	–	1	1	–	5	–	2
+ – Conference co-champions; ^ – Selected as Rose Bowl representative; Rankings from United Press

The 1935 Montana Grizzlies football team represented the University of Montana in the 1935 college football season as a member of the Pacific Coast Conference (PCC). The Grizzlies were led by first-year head coach Doug Fessenden, played their home games at Dornblaser Field and finished the season with a record of one win, five losses and two ties (1–5–2, 0–5–1 PCC).

== Schedule ==
Date	Opponent	Site	Result	Attendance	Source
September 28	at USC	Los Angeles Memorial Coliseum; Los Angeles, CA	L 0–9	30,000	
October 5	vs. Montana State*	Clark Park; Butte, MT (rivalry)	W 20–0	6,000	
October 12	Washington State	Dornblaser Field; Missoula, MT	L 7–13	6,000	
October 26	at Idaho	MacLean Field; Moscow, ID (rivalry)	L 7–14		
November 2	at Washington	Husky Stadium; Seattle, WA	L 7–33	10,573	
November 9	vs. Gonzaga*	Memorial Stadium; Great Falls, MT	T 7–7	3,500	
November 16	at Stanford	Stanford Stadium; Stanford, CA	L 0–32		
November 23	Oregon State	Dornblaser Field; Missoula, MT	T 0–0	4,000	
*Non-conference game; Source:
