= 1935 Idaho Southern Branch Bengals football team =

American college football season

1935 Idaho Southern Branch Bengals football
- Conference: Independent
- Record: 7–0–1
- Head coach: Guy Wicks (1st season)
- Captain: Wendell Twitchell (Note: Twitchell was inducted to the Idaho State University athletic hall of fame in 1982.)
- Home stadium: Hutchinson Field

1935 Western college football independents records
	Conf.			Overall
Team	W	L	T	W		L		T
Idaho Southern Branch		–		7	–	0	–	1
Humboldt State		–		6	–	1	–	1
Cal Poly		–		5	–	2	–	1
Pomona		–		5	–	2	–	1
No. 23 Saint Mary's		–		5	–	2	–	2
Hawaii		–		5	–	3	–	0
San Francisco		–		5	–	3	–	0
Gonzaga		–		5	–	4	–	1
Loyola (CA)		–		6	–	5	–	0
San Jose State		–		5	–	5	–	1
Portland		–		3	–	4	–	0
Santa Clara		–		3	–	6	–	1
San Francisco State		–		2	–	5	–	1
Rankings from United Press

The 1935 Idaho Southern Branch Bengals football team was an American football team that represented the University of Idaho, Southern Branch (later renamed Idaho State University) as an independent during the 1935 college football season. In their first season under head coach Guy Wicks, the team compiled a 7–0–1 record and outscored opponents by a total of 202 to 26.

== Schedule ==
Date	Opponent	Site	Result	Attendance	Source
October 5	at Albion Normal (Note: Albion Normal is listed in some sources as Southern Idaho, a name adopted in 1947.)	Albion, ID	W 26–6		
October 12	Ricks	Hutchinson Field; Pocatello, ID	W 27–0		
October 19	at Western State (CO)	Gunnison, CO	W 13–0		
October 26	vs. College of Idaho	Twin Falls, ID	W 37–7		
November 2	Montana Mines	Hutchinson Field; Pocatello, ID	W 60–0		
November 11	Montana State^{†}	Hutchinson Field; Pocatello, ID	T 7–7		
November 16	Boise Junior College	Hutchinson Field; Pocatello, ID	W 19–6		
November 22	at Santa Rosa	Bailey Field; Santa Rosa, CA	W 13–0	2,000	
^{†}Homecoming
