= 1935 Santa Barbara State Roadrunners football team =

American college football season

1935 Santa Barbara State Roadrunners football
- Conference: Southern California Conference
- Record: 5–2–2 (2–2–1 SCC)
- Head coach: Spud Harder (2nd season)
- Home stadium: Peabody Stadium

1935 Southern California Conference football standings
	Conf.					Overall
Team	W		L		T	W		L		T
Whittier $	4	–	1	–	0	5	–	5	–	0
Redlands	3	–	1	–	1	7	–	1	–	1
Santa Barbara State	2	–	2	–	1	5	–	2	–	2
San Diego State	2	–	2	–	1	3	–	4	–	1
Occidental	1	–	2	–	1	3	–	3	–	2
La Verne	0	–	4	–	0	3	–	6	–	1
$ – Conference champion

The 1935 Santa Barbara State Roadrunners football team represented Santa Barbara State (Note: University of California, Santa Barbara was known as Santa Barbara State College from 1921 to 1943.) during the 1935 college football season.

Santa Barbara State competed in the Southern California Intercollegiate Athletic Conference (SCIAC). The Roadrunners were led by second-year head coach Theodore "Spud" Harder and played home games at Peabody Stadium in Santa Barbara, California. They finished the season with a record of five wins, two losses and two ties (5–2–2, 2–2–1 SCIAC). Overall, the team outscored its opponents 97–32 for the season. The Roadrunners had four shutouts, and held the other team to a touchdown or less in all 9 games.

== Schedule ==
Date	Opponent	Site	Result	Source
September 20	Santa Barbara Athletic Club*	Peabody Stadium; Santa Barbara, CA	T 6–6	
September 25	Caltech*	Peabody Stadium; Santa Barbara, CA	W 26–6	
October 5	San Diego State	Aztec Field; San Diego, CA	T 7–7	
October 11	USC JV*	Peabody Stadium; Santa Barbara, CA	W 13–0	
October 19	at Redlands	Redlands Stadium (Note: This stadium is the predecessor to the current Ted Runner Stadium on the University of Redlands campus, which was opened for the 1968 season); Redlands, CA	L 6–7	
October 25	La Verne	Peabody Stadium; Santa Barbara, CA	W 21–0	
November 2	at Occidental	D.W. Patterson Field; Los Angeles, CA	W 6–0	
November 8	at San Francisco State*	Ewing Field; San Francisco, CA	W 12–0	
November 16	Whittier	Peabody Stadium; Santa Barbara, CA	L 0–6	
*Non-conference game
