= Deep River, Washington =

- CDP
- Location in the state of Washington
- Coordinates: 46°22′03″N 123°41′35″W
- Country: United States
- State: Washington
- County: Wahkiakum

Area
  - Total: 13.538 sq mi (35.063 km^{2})
  - Land: 13.308 sq mi (34.467 km^{2})
  - Water: 0.231 sq mi (0.597 km^{2}) 1.70%
- Elevation: 154 ft (47 m)

Population (2010)
  - Total: 204
  - Estimate (2020): 159
- Population as of 2010 U.S. Census
- Time zone: UTC−8 (PST)
  - Summer (DST): UTC−7 (PDT)
- ZIP Code: 98638
- Area code(s): 360, 564
- FIPS code: 53-17215
- GNIS feature ID: 2584966

Deep River is a census-designated place (CDP) in Wahkiakum County, Washington, northwest of the town of Cathlamet and east of the city of Long Beach. In 2020, the population was estimated to be 159. The CDP includes the Svensens Landing community. The Deep River community is part of the Naselle-Grays River Valley School District, a K-12 school district of about 670 students.

== Geography ==
According to the United States Census Bureau, the CDP has a total area of 13.54 square miles (35.06 km^{2}), of which, 13.31 square miles (34.47 km^{2}) of it is land and 0.23 square miles (0.60 km^{2}) of it (1.70%) is water.

== Demographics ==
Historical population
Census	Pop.	Note	%±
2010	204		—
2020	217		6.4%
2020 (est.)	159	▼	−22.1%
U.S. Decennial Census; 2000 2010

Deep River first appeared as a census designated place in the 2010 U.S. census.

=== Racial and ethnic composition ===
Deep River CDP, Washington – Racial and ethnic composition Note: the US Census treats Hispanic/Latino as an ethnic category. This table excludes Latinos from the racial categories and assigns them to a separate category. Hispanics/Latinos may be of any race.
Race / Ethnicity (NH = Non-Hispanic)	Pop 2010	Pop 2020	% 2010	% 2020
White alone (NH)	193	191	94.61%	88.02%
Black or African American alone (NH)	0	1	0.00%	0.46%
Native American or Alaska Native alone (NH)	0	0	0.00%	0.00%
Asian alone (NH)	0	0	0.00%	0.00%
Native Hawaiian or Pacific Islander alone (NH)	0	0	0.00%	0.00%
Other race alone (NH)	0	0	0.00%	0.00%
Mixed race or Multiracial (NH)	8	23	3.92%	10.60%
Hispanic or Latino (any race)	3	2	1.47%	0.92%
Total	204	217	100.00%	100.00%

=== 2010 census ===
As of the census of 2010, there were 204 people, 92 households, and 63 families residing in the CDP. The population density was 15.07 people per square mile (5.82/km^{2}). There were 114 housing units at an average density of 8.42/sq mi (3.25/km^{2}). The racial makeup of the CDP was 95.1% White, 0.0% African American, 0.5% Native American, 0.0% Asian, 0.0% Pacific Islander, 0.5% from other races, and 3.9% from two or more races. Hispanic or Latino of any race were 1.5% of the population.

There were 92 households, out of which 15.2% had children under the age of 18 living with them, 55.4% were married couples living together, 5.4% had a female householder with no husband present, and 31.5% were non-families. 25.0% of all households were made up of individuals, and 10.7% had someone living alone who was 65 years of age or older. The average household size was 2.22 and the average family size was 2.56.

The median household income is $46,250. The poverty rate is 8.2% in Deep River.

94.6% of Deep Riverians have graduated from high school or higher. For 37.2% of residents, their highest educational attainment is high school or an equivalent degree; 31.8% have some college, and no degree; 17.6% have an associate's degree; 4.1% each have a bachelor's degree or a graduate and professional degree.

In the CDP, the age distribution of the population shows 15.2% under the age of 18, 3.9% from 18 to 24, 17.2% from 25 to 44, 36.8% from 45 to 64, and 27.0% who were 65 years of age or older. The median age was 55.4 years. For every 100 females, there were 112.5 males. For every 100 females age 18 and over, there were 108.4 males.

== Notable Person ==
Krist Novoselic, the bassist for early 1990s grunge rock band, Nirvana, was recorded as being a resident of Deep River.
