= Charles Alexander (running back) =

American football player (born 1957)

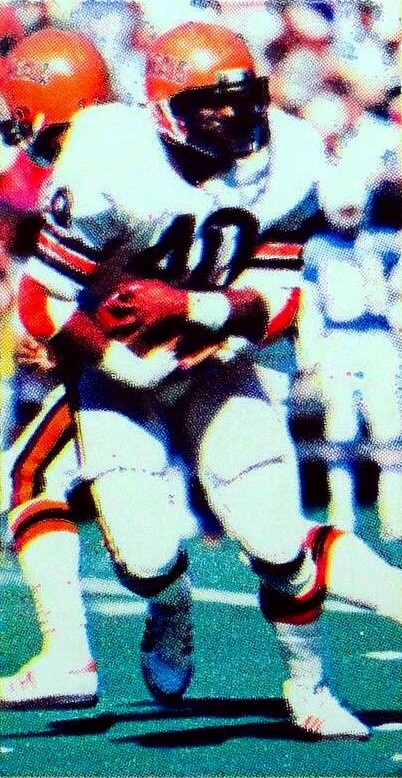
- Alexander with the Cincinnati Bengals in 1980

No. 40
- Position: Running back

Personal information
- Born: July 28, 1957 (age 69); Galveston, Texas, U.S.
- Listed height: 6 ft 1 in (1.85 m)
- Listed weight: 224 lb (102 kg)

Career information
- High school: Ball (Galveston)
- College: LSU
- NFL draft: 1979: 1st round, 12th overall pick

Career history
- Cincinnati Bengals (1979–1985)

Awards and highlights
- SEC Player of the Year (1977); 2× Consensus All-American (1977, 1978); 2× First-team All-SEC (1977, 1978); Louisiana Sports Hall of Fame

Career NFL statistics
- Rushing yards: 2,645
- Rushing average: 3.5
- Rushing touchdowns: 13
- Stats at Pro Football Reference
- College Football Hall of Fame

Charles Fred Alexander Jr. (born July 28, 1957) is an American former professional football player who was a running back in the National Football League (NFL) for seven seasons with the Cincinnati Bengals. He played college football for the LSU Tigers and twice received consensus All-America honors, and he was later inducted into the College Football Hall of Fame. He was a first-round pick in the 1979 NFL draft by the Bengals.

== Early life ==
Alexander was born in Galveston, Texas. He played football at Ball High School, where his role as a player was primarily as a blocking back. As a result, opportunities to show his ability were limited; he did not manage 1,000 yards in his entire prep career and was only recruited by a handful of colleges.

== College career ==
Alexander was recruited to Louisiana State University by running backs coach Jerry Stovall. He later recalled that Stovall offered him trust and a real chance to be a big-time running back. "As soon as I got here, I knew it was the place for me." Alexander joined Hall of Fame coach Charles McClendon's LSU Tigers football team as a freshman in 1975. He played his first two seasons backing up All-SEC running back Terry Robiskie. He rushed for 1,177 yards total in those two seasons, including 876 yards in his sophomore year.

Alexander became the Tigers' starting running back in his junior season in 1977. Against Oregon, he scored four touchdowns and set a school record by rushing for 237 yards. For his performance he was named United Press International Back of the Week. His 1,686 rushing yards that season helped carry LSU to an 8–3 regular season record and a trip to the Sun Bowl. In that game, Alexander set two Sun Bowl rushing records, carrying 31 times for 197 yards as he received Offensive Player of the Game honors. Despite Alexander's efforts—for which he was named to the 75th Anniversary All-Sun Bowl Team—LSU fell to Stanford 24–14.

Alexander's workload dropped in his senior season in 1978, as the Tigers' offense became more balanced with fellow future LSU Athletic Hall of Famer David Woodley at quarterback. He and Woodley led the team to another 8–3 record. Toward the end of the season, Alexander was drawing comparisons to NFL running back Earl Campbell due to his "unique, slashing running style." He played his last game as a Tiger in the 1978 Liberty Bowl, in which he rushed for 133 yards on 24 carries in a 20–15 loss to Missouri.

His accomplishments in an LSU uniform led fans to refer to him affectionately as "Alexander the Great." In each of his final two seasons with the Tigers, Alexander was selected as a consensus All-American and earned All-SEC honors. The 1977 campaign also saw Alexander selected as the SEC Most Valuable Player by the Nashville Banner. During his college career Alexander set nine SEC records, tied another and set 27 LSU records. He finished his LSU career with 4,035 rushing yards—over 1,500 yards more than the Tigers' previous career rushing yards leader. His 1,686 rushing yards total and 153.3 yards per game in the 1977 season stood as LSU single-season records until the 2015 season, when both were surpassed by Leonard Fournette.

== Professional career ==
Alexander was selected 12th overall in the first round of the 1979 draft by the Cincinnati Bengals. He spent the majority of his professional career backing up Pro Bowl running back Pete Johnson, while also splitting carries with former Heisman winner Archie Griffin. His most productive season came in 1980, during which he played in all 16 regular season games and carried the ball 169 times for 702 yards.

He played a prominent role during the Bengals' run in the 1981 playoffs. In their divisional round win against the Buffalo Bills, Alexander rushed for 72 yards and scored two touchdowns. He is one of four Bengals players to score multiple touchdowns from scrimmage in a single postseason game, as well as the first to do so. He rushed for 22 yards and caught three passes for 25 yards in the Bengals' win over San Diego in the infamous "Freezer Bowl." "Everything on the sidelines froze: the players, the water, the Gatorade, everything," said Alexander about the game conditions. In Super Bowl XVI, he carried five times for 17 yards while catching two passes for three yards in the Bengals' loss to the 49ers.

Alexander finished his career with 2,645 rushing yards and 13 touchdowns, while adding 165 receptions for 1,130 yards and two touchdowns.

== Career statistics ==
Legend
**Bold**	Career high

=== NFL ===
==== Regular season ====
Year	Team	Games		Rushing					Receiving				
Year	Team	GP	GS	Att	Yds	Avg	Lng	TD	Rec	Yds	Avg	Lng	TD
1979	CIN	16	3	88	286	3.3	17	1	11	91	8.3	13	0
1980	CIN	16	16	**169**	**702**	**4.2**	**37**	2	**36**	192	5.3	23	0
1981	CIN	15	14	98	292	3.0	16	2	28	**262**	**9.4**	**65**	**1**
1982	CIN	9	9	64	207	3.2	18	1	14	85	6.1	14	**1**
1983	CIN	14	14	153	523	3.4	12	**3**	32	187	5.8	14	0
1984	CIN	16	12	132	479	3.6	22	2	29	203	7.0	22	0
1985	CIN	16	5	44	156	3.5	18	2	15	110	7.3	19	0
		102	73	748	2,645	3.5	37	13	165	1,130	6.8	65	2

==== Postseason ====
Year	Team	Games		Rushing					Receiving				
Year	Team	GP	GS	Att	Yds	Avg	Lng	TD	Rec	Yds	Avg	Lng	TD
1981	CIN	3	3	**27**	**111**	**4.1**	**30**	**2**	**6**	**38**	**6.3**	**16**	0
1982	CIN	1	1	7	14	2.0	6	0	0	0	0.0	0	0
		4	4	34	125	3.7	30	2	6	38	6.3	16	0

=== College ===
Legend
Led the SEC
SEC record
Led the NCAA
NCAA record

College rushing & receiving statistics*
Season	Team	GP	Rushing					Receiving		
Season	Team	GP	Att	Yds	Avg	TD	Rec	Yds	Avg	TD
1975	LSU	11	108	301	2.8	2	1	6	6.0	0
1976	LSU	11	155	876	**5.7**	7	8	82	**10.3**	0
1977	LSU	11	**311**	**1,686**	5.4	**17**	12	80	6.7	0
1978	LSU	11	281	1,172	4.2	14	**28**	**263**	9.4	**2**
Career		44	855	4,035	4.7	40	49	431	8.8	2

* Includes bowl games.

== Later life ==
After retiring from the NFL, Alexander went into the oil and gas business. He also briefly served as assistant director of LSU's Tiger Athletic Foundation. In 1989, Alexander was inducted into the LSU Athletic Hall of Fame. In 2011, he founded Charlie 4 Strong Seasoning, Inc., which markets C'mon Man Cajun seasoning and fish fry. In 2012, he became the eighth former LSU football player inducted into the College Football Hall of Fame.
