= 1935 California Golden Bears football team =

American college football season

1935 California Golden Bears football

PCC co-champion
- Conference: Pacific Coast Conference
- Record: 9–1 (4–1 PCC)
- Head coach: Stub Allison (1st season)
- Home stadium: California Memorial Stadium

1935 Pacific Coast Conference football standings
	Conf.					Overall
Team	W		L		T	W		L		T
No. 6 Stanford ^ +	4	–	1	–	0	8	–	1	–	0
No. 9 California +	4	–	1	–	0	9	–	1	–	0
No. 18 UCLA +	4	–	1	–	0	8	–	2	–	0
Washington State	3	–	2	–	0	5	–	3	–	1
Oregon	3	–	2	–	0	6	–	3	–	0
No. 23 Washington	4	–	3	–	0	5	–	3	–	0
Oregon State	2	–	3	–	1	6	–	4	–	1
USC	2	–	4	–	0	5	–	7	–	0
Idaho	1	–	5	–	0	2	–	7	–	0
Montana	0	–	5	–	1	1	–	5	–	2
+ – Conference co-champions; ^ – Selected as Rose Bowl representative; Rankings from United Press

The 1935 California Golden Bears football team was an American football team that represented the University of California, Berkeley in the Pacific Coast Conference (PCC) during the 1935 college football season. In their first year under head coach Stub Allison, the team compiled a 9–1 record (4–1 against PCC opponents), finished in a tie for the PCC championship, and outscored its opponents by a combined total of 163 to 22.

== Schedule ==
Date	Opponent	Site	Result	Attendance	Source
September 28	Cal Aggies*	California Memorial Stadium; Berkeley, CA	W 47–0	20,000	
September 28	Whittier*	California Memorial Stadium; Berkeley, CA	W 6–0	20,000	
October 5	Saint Mary's*	California Memorial Stadium; Berkeley, CA	W 10–0	50,000	
October 12	at Oregon	Multnomah Stadium; Portland, OR	W 6–0		
October 19	Santa Clara*	California Memorial Stadium; Berkeley, CA	W 6–0	50,000	
October 26	USC	California Memorial Stadium; Berkeley, CA	W 21–7	48,000	
November 2	at UCLA	Los Angeles Memorial Coliseum; Los Angeles, CA (rivalry)	W 14–2	80,000	
November 9	Washington	California Memorial Stadium; Berkeley, CA	W 14–0	48,734	
November 16	Pacific (CA)*	California Memorial Stadium; Berkeley, CA	W 39–0		
November 23	at Stanford	Stanford Stadium; Stanford, CA (Big Game)	L 0–13	90,000	
*Non-conference game; Source:
