= Poi Bowl =

Defunct college football bowl game held in Honolulu

Poi Bowl (defunct)
- Stadium: Honolulu Stadium
- Location: Honolulu, Hawaii
- Operated: 1936–1939
- Conference tie-ins: Pacific Coast Conference
- Succeeded by: Pineapple Bowl

The Poi Bowl was a college football bowl game played during the late 1930s in Honolulu, Hawaii, at Honolulu Stadium. The game featured the then-Hawaii Rainbows and, usually, an invited team from the Pacific Coast Conference.

== History ==
The game was contested in early January from 1936 to 1939. The bowl was named after poi, a traditional taro-based staple food in Polynesia, on suggestion from Vernon "Red" McQueen, sports editor of The Honolulu Advertiser. In December 1938, the contest was renamed as the Pineapple Bowl at the request of the University of Hawaii at Manoa.

The university invited teams from the Pacific Coast Conference to participate in the Poi Bowl every year except for 1937, when they played a local all-star team. The game was normally contested on New Year's Day, except in 1939 when the holiday fell on a Sunday, and by mutual agreement of the teams in 1937 due to heavy rain.

For the 1937 game, Hawaii's opponent was to be determined by a Christmas Day contest between Kamehameha alumni and the "Town Team". However, when that game ended in a tie, an all-star roster of players from those two teams was selected.

== Game results ==
The University of Hawaii went 1–3 in the Poi Bowl.

Date	Winner		Loser		Attendance	Ref.
January 1, 1936	USC	38	Hawaii	6	18,000	
January 2, 1937	Hawaii	18	Honolulu All-Stars	12	5,000	
January 1, 1938	Washington	53	Hawaii	13	13,000	
January 2, 1939	UCLA	32	Hawaii	7	18,000	

While NCAA records indicate the January 1939 edition was staged as the Poi Bowl, contemporary newspaper reports indicate it was held under the Pineapple Bowl name.

The media guide of the now-Hawaii Rainbow Warriors football program does not include any Poi Bowl games in their bowl game history. Results do appear in the NCAA's bowl game history, in the "Unsanctioned Or Other Bowls" section.

== See also ==
- Pineapple Bowl (1940–1952)
- Aloha Bowl (1982–2000)
- Oahu Bowl (1998–2000)
- Seattle Bowl (2001–2002)
- Hawaii Bowl (2002–present)
- Hula Bowl (1947–2008; 2020–present)
- List of college bowl games
