= Steve Dils =

American football player (born 1955)

No. 12, 8
- Position: Quarterback

Personal information
- Born: December 8, 1955 (age 70); Seattle, Washington, U.S.
- Listed height: 6 ft 1 in (1.85 m)
- Listed weight: 190 lb (86 kg)

Career information
- High school: Fort Vancouver (Vancouver, Washington)
- College: Stanford
- NFL draft: 1979: 4th round, 97th overall pick

Career history
- Minnesota Vikings (1979–1984); Los Angeles Rams (1984–1987); Atlanta Falcons (1988)

Awards and highlights
- Sammy Baugh Trophy (1978); Second-team All-Pac-10 (1978)

Career NFL statistics
- Passing attempts: 972
- Passing completions: 504
- Completion percentage: 51.9%
- TD–INT: 27–32
- Passing yards: 5,816
- Passer rating: 65.8
- Stats at Pro Football Reference

Stephen Whitfield Dils (born December 8, 1955) is an American former professional football player who was a quarterback for 10 seasons in the National Football League (NFL). He played college football for the Stanford Cardinal.

== College career ==
Dils played high school football at Fort Vancouver High School in Vancouver, Washington, and attended Stanford University. He was Stanford's starting quarterback under Bill Walsh in 1978, and led Stanford to a 25–22 victory over Georgia in the 1978 Bluebonnet Bowl, where he was named the game's offensive most valuable player. That season, Dils won the Sammy Baugh Trophy, awarded to the top passer in college football.

=== College statistics ===
Legend
	Led the Pac-8/Pac-10
	Led the NCAA
**Bold**	Career high

College passing statistics*
Season	Team	GP	Cmp	Att	Yds	Pct	TD	INT	Rtg
1977	Stanford	**11**	27	42	335	**64.3**	1	**0**	**139.1**
1978	Stanford	**11**	**247**	**391**	**2,943**	63.2	**22**	15	137.3
Career		22	274	433	3,278	63.3%	23	15	137.5

* Includes bowl games.

== NFL career ==
Dils was selected by the Minnesota Vikings in the fourth round of the 1979 NFL draft. In his second year with the club, he made his first start filling in for an injured Tommy Kramer and led the Vikings to a win over the Washington Redskins, a game which proved crucial to Minnesota's playoff run that year. He played six seasons with the Vikings and started most of the 1983 season, where he was paired in the backfield with former Stanford teammate Darrin Nelson. He was traded to the Los Angeles Rams in 1984. He spent his final full season with the Atlanta Falcons before retiring with the Rams before the 1989 regular season began.

Chris Berman bestowed one of his more labored nicknames—Steve "Love the One You're With" Dils—based on the player's vague similarity in name to Stephen Stills.

== After football ==
Dils is currently the managing director of the Canadian commercial real estate company Avison Young's Atlanta office.

== See also ==
- List of NCAA major college football yearly passing leaders
