= 1935 Santa Clara Broncos football team =

American college football season

1935 Santa Clara Broncos football
- Conference: Independent
- Record: 3–6
- Head coach: Clipper Smith (7th season)
- Home stadium: Kezar Stadium

1935 Western college football independents records
	Conf.			Overall
Team	W	L	T	W		L		T
Idaho Southern Branch		–		7	–	0	–	1
Humboldt State		–		6	–	1	–	1
Cal Poly		–		5	–	2	–	1
Pomona		–		5	–	2	–	1
No. 23 Saint Mary's		–		5	–	2	–	2
Hawaii		–		5	–	3	–	0
San Francisco		–		5	–	3	–	0
Gonzaga		–		5	–	4	–	1
Loyola (CA)		–		6	–	5	–	0
San Jose State		–		5	–	5	–	1
Portland		–		3	–	4	–	0
Santa Clara		–		3	–	6	–	1
San Francisco State		–		2	–	5	–	1
Rankings from United Press

The 1935 Santa Clara Broncos football team was an American football team that represented Santa Clara University as an independent during the 1935 college football season. In their seventh season under head coach Clipper Smith, the Broncos compiled a 3–6 record and outscored opponents by 82 to 69.

== Schedule ==
Date	Opponent	Site	Result	Attendance	Source
September 28	at San Francisco	Kezar Stadium; San Francisco, CA	W 20–7	30,000–40,000	
October 5	at Washington	Husky Stadium; Seattle, WA	L 6–13	19,543	
October 12	at Fresno State	Fresno State College Stadium; Fresno, CA	W 24–0	8,500	
October 19	at California	California Memorial Stadium; Berkeley, CA	L 0–6	50,000	
October 26	Portland	Kezar Stadium; San Francisco, CA	W 20–7		
November 2	at Stanford	Stanford Stadium; Stanford, CA	L 6–9	60,000	
November 17	vs. Saint Mary's	Kezar Stadium; San Francisco, CA	L 0–10	60,000	
December 1	at Loyola (CA)	Gilmore Stadium; Los Angeles, CA	L 0–7	14,000	
December 7	TCU	Kezar Stadium; San Francisco, CA	L 6–10	25,000	
