= Keith Topping (American football) =

American football player (1912–1974)

Profile
- Position: End

Personal information
- Born: August 17, 1912; Buffalo, New York, U.S.
- Died: September 14, 1974 (aged 62); Pasadena, California, U.S.
- Listed height: 6 ft 3 in (1.91 m)
- Listed weight: 190 lb (86 kg)

Career information
- High school: John Muir (Pasadena, California)
- College: Stanford
- NFL draft: 1936: 2nd round, 11th overall pick

Career history
- Boston Redskins (1936)*; Danbury Trojans (1936–1937)
- * Offseason or practice squad member only

Awards and highlights
- All-American (1935); 2× Second-team All-PCC (1934, 1935); Rose Bowl Most Valuable Player (1936)

William Keith Topping (August 17, 1912 – September 14, 1974) was an American football end.

== Biography ==
Born in Buffalo, New York, Topping grew up in Pasadena, California. He attended high school there at John Muir before playing college football at Stanford. He spent six years at Stanford, from 1930 to 1935, but did not play football until several years after he joined. After the 1935 season, Topping was named Second-team All-America by the Kansas City Star. He also was the year's Rose Bowl Most Valuable Player award winner, given the credit of Stanford's upset win over SMU. Assistant coach Jim Lawson said that "Topping meant the difference between a win for them and a win for us." After his 1935 performance he was selected with the 11th pick of the 1936 NFL draft by the Boston Redskins. He was their second ever selection and the first ever pick from Stanford. However, Topping did not play with Boston and instead joined the minor league Danbury Trojans, following an appearance in the 1936 College All-Star Game. He played two seasons with Danbury, appearing in 11 games, starting 9. Following his sports career, Topping became a sports writer and co-owner of two newspapers. He purchased the Hanford Morning Journal and Hanford Sentinel along with Stanley Beaubaire. A few years later he served in World War II on the island of Guam. Topping later was inducted into the Stanford Athletics Hall of Fame. He died on September 14, 1974, in Pasadena, at the age of 62.
