= 1935 Stanford Indians football team =

American college football season

1935 Stanford Indians football

PCC co-champion Rose Bowl champion

Rose Bowl, W 7–0 vs. SMU
- Conference: Pacific Coast Conference
- Record: 8–1 (4–1 PCC)
- Head coach: Tiny Thornhill (3rd season)
- Captain: Bob "Bones" Hamilton
- Home stadium: Stanford Stadium

1935 Pacific Coast Conference football standings
	Conf.					Overall
Team	W		L		T	W		L		T
No. 6 Stanford ^ +	4	–	1	–	0	8	–	1	–	0
No. 9 California +	4	–	1	–	0	9	–	1	–	0
No. 18 UCLA +	4	–	1	–	0	8	–	2	–	0
Washington State	3	–	2	–	0	5	–	3	–	1
Oregon	3	–	2	–	0	6	–	3	–	0
No. 23 Washington	4	–	3	–	0	5	–	3	–	0
Oregon State	2	–	3	–	1	6	–	4	–	1
USC	2	–	4	–	0	5	–	7	–	0
Idaho	1	–	5	–	0	2	–	7	–	0
Montana	0	–	5	–	1	1	–	5	–	2
+ – Conference co-champions; ^ – Selected as Rose Bowl representative; Rankings from United Press

The 1935 Stanford Indians football team represented Stanford University in the 1935 college football season. In head coach Tiny Thornhill's third season, the team was Pacific Coast Conference co-champions with one loss, allowing opponents to score just 13 points all season. This was the third season that the "Vow Boys" kept their vow and defeated USC.

Each of the three co-champions had one loss to one of the other co-champions: Stanford to UCLA, UCLA to California, and California to Stanford. With Stanford's shutout of California in the last game of the season, Stanford was selected to represent the conference in the Rose Bowl against undefeated and number-one ranked SMU. This marked Stanford's third consecutive Rose Bowl appearance, and the team had lost the previous two appearances. Against heavily favored SMU, Stanford pulled off a 7–0 upset, the team's second Rose Bowl victory.

== Schedule ==
Date	Opponent	Site	Result	Attendance	Source
September 28	San Jose State*	Stanford Stadium; Stanford, CA (rivalry)	W 35–0		
October 5	at San Francisco*	Kezar Stadium; San Francisco, CA	W 10–0	25,000	
October 12	UCLA	Stanford Stadium; Stanford, CA	L 6–7	35,000	
October 26	at Washington	Husky Stadium; Seattle, WA	W 6–0	35,098	
November 2	Santa Clara*	Stanford Stadium; Stanford, CA	W 9–6	60,000	
November 9	at USC	Los Angeles Memorial Coliseum; Los Angeles, CA (rivalry)	W 3–0	50,000	
November 16	Montana	Stanford Stadium; Stanford, CA	W 32–0		
November 23	California	Stanford Stadium; Stanford, CA (Big Game)	W 13–0	90,000	
January 1, 1936	vs. SMU*	Rose Bowl; Pasadena, CA (Rose Bowl)	W 7–0	87,000	
*Non-conference game; Source:

== Players drafted by the NFL ==
Player	Position	Round	Pick	NFL club
Keith Topping	End	2	11	Boston Redskins
Wes Muller	Center	3	19	Philadelphia Eagles
Bobby Grayson	Back	3	21	Pittsburgh Pirates
Bob Reynolds	Tackle	6	52	Green Bay Packers
Bob "Bones" Hamilton	Back	8	67	Brooklyn Dodgers
Monk Moscrip	End	9	76	Brooklyn Dodgers
Niels Larsen	Tackle	9	77	Chicago Cardinals
