= Gordy Ceresino =

Canadian gridiron football player (born 1957)

Profile
- Position: Linebacker

Personal information
- Born: October 26, 1957 (age 69); Thunder Bay, Ontario, Canada

Career information
- High school: Notre Dame (Sherman Oaks, California)
- College: Stanford

Career history
- 1979: San Francisco 49ers

Awards and highlights
- 2× First-team All-Pac-10 (1977, 1978); Second-team All-Pac-8 (1976)
- Stats at Pro Football Reference

Gordon Joseph "Gordy" Ceresino is a former professional American football linebacker who played one season with the San Francisco 49ers in 1979.

Ceresino played college football for Stanford University and was named the most valuable defensive player of both the 1977 Sun Bowl (in which Stanford defeated LSU 24–14) and the 1978 Bluebonnet Bowl, in which Stanford defeated Georgia 25–22. He is a member of the Stanford Athletic Hall of Fame.

He now lives in San Diego, California. His daughter Jessica was a midfielder for the University of Colorado women's soccer team.
