= 1978 Astro-Bluebonnet Bowl =

Stanford Cardinals	Georgia Bulldogs
(7–4)	(9–1–1)
25	22
Head coach: Bill Walsh	Head coach: Vince Dooley
AP / Coaches; NR / 20	AP / Coaches; 11 / 7
	1	2	3	4	Total
Stanford	0	0	22	3	25
Georgia	3	12	7	0	22
- Date: December 31, 1978
- Season: 1978
- Stadium: Houston Astrodome
- Location: Houston, Texas
- MVP: Steve Dils (QB), Stanford; Gordy Ceresino (LB), Stanford
- Referee: Jack Baker (WAC)
- Attendance: 34,084

United States TV coverage
- Network: Mizlou Television Network
- Announcers: Merle Harmon, Don Perkins and Howard David

The 1978 Astro-Bluebonnet Bowl (December) game was a post-season college football bowl game between the Georgia Bulldogs and the Stanford Cardinals, and was played on December 31, 1978, at the Houston Astrodome in Houston, Texas. It was the twentieth edition of the Bluebonnet Bowl. Stanford overcame a 22–0 third quarter deficit and won the game, 25–22.

== Teams ==
=== Stanford ===
Stanford was making its second consecutive bowl appearance under second-year head coach Bill Walsh. Stanford was noted for its pass-heavy offense, led by Sammy Baugh Trophy-award winning quarterback Steve Dils and his targets, receiver Ken Margerum and back Darrin Nelson.

=== Georgia ===
A tie in their second-to-last game of the season kept Georgia out of a possible berth in the 1979 Sugar Bowl. Led by long-time coach Vince Dooley, the Bulldogs were ranked #11 and featured a punishing defense and a rushing attack led by SEC offensive player of the year Willie McClendon. The Bulldogs had lost their last three bowl games, dating back to the 1974 Tangerine Bowl.

== Game summary ==
Georgia dominated the first half, scoring on two Carmon Prince touchdown receptions and a Rex Robinson field goal to lead 15–0 at the half. The only miscues were in the kicking game: Robinson missed the extra point on both touchdowns. Early in the third quarter, another Bulldog score on a one-yard run by quarterback Jeff Pyburn made the score 22–0, and it appeared that Georgia would complete a rout.

But following that score, Stanford quarterback Steve Dils hit receiver Ken Margerum on a 32-yard touchdown pass. Stanford's attempt at a two-point conversion was no good, but on Georgia's ensuing possession, running back Willie McClendon fumbled on the Georgia 19. Two plays later, Dils connected with Darrin Nelson for a 20-yard touchdown pass. Stanford then completed a successful two-point conversion, in which kicker Ken Naber faked a kick attempt and then ran into the end zone to make the score 22–14.

Georgia's next possession was three plays and a short punt which gave Stanford the ball at the Georgia 41. Three plays later, Dils hit Margerum again for a 14-yard touchdown pass, and connected with Nelson for the two-point conversion to tie the game at 22–22. The Bulldogs fumbled again (one of five on the day), setting up a Naber 27-yard field goal which gave Stanford a 25–22 lead early in the fourth quarter.

Georgia's Robinson missed another field goal to tie the game and the Stanford defense did the rest to shut down the Bulldogs, led by linebacker Gordy Ceresino's 20 tackles. Ceresino was named the game's defensive MVP; offensive MVP was quarterback Dils, who completed 17 of 28 passes for 210 yards and three touchdowns.

=== Scoring ===
==== First quarter ====
- Georgia - Rex Robinson 31-yard field goal

==== Second quarter ====
- Georgia - Carmon Prince 22-yard pass from Buck Belue (Robinson kick failed)
- Georgia - Prince 8-yard pass from Jeff Pyburn (Robinson kick failed)

==== Third quarter ====
- Georgia - Pyburn 1-yard run (Robinson kick)
- Stanford - Ken Margerum 32-yard pass from Steve Dils (Dils pass failed)
- Stanford - Darrin Nelson 20-yard pass from Dils (Ken Naber run)
- Stanford - Margerum 14-yard pass from Dils (Dils pass to Nelson)

==== Fourth quarter ====
- Stanford - Naber 24-yard field goal

== Aftermath ==
This was the last game of Bill Walsh's first coaching stint with Stanford; following this game, he became head coach of the NFL's San Francisco 49ers, eventually leading them to three Super Bowl titles. Walsh returned to Stanford in 1992 and coached the Cardinal for three seasons and one bowl victory. Stanford's football program slid after Walsh's departure, and they would not return to a bowl for 8 years when they earned a berth in the 1986 Gator Bowl.

Georgia did not make a bowl in the following season, but Dooley's 1980 team, quarterbacked by Buck Belue, who was a freshman in the Bluebonnet Bowl, was undefeated and named national champion by most media organizations.
