= 1936 Rose Bowl =

American college football game

- 22nd Rose Bowl Game
Stanford Indians	SMU Mustangs
(7–1)	(12–0)
PCC	SWC
7	0
Head coach: Tiny Thornhill	Head coach: Matty Bell
	1	2	3	4	Total
Stanford	7	0	0	0	7
SMU	0	0	0	0	0
- Date: January 1, 1936
- Season: 1935
- Stadium: Rose Bowl Stadium
- Location: Pasadena, California
- MVP: Keith Topping (E) – Stanford; Monk Moscrip (E) – Stanford
- Referee: Bob Morris
- Attendance: 84,784

The 1936 Rose Bowl was the 22nd Rose Bowl game, an American post-season college football game that was played on New Year's Day 1936 in Pasadena, California. It featured the undefeated SMU Mustangs against the Stanford Indians, which had one loss. This was the first Rose Bowl to features two teams that were both located west of the Mississippi River, as the bowl game typically pitted the best teams from the eastern and western United States.

== Background ==
Stanford had been to six previous Rose Bowls in a span of 34 years (they went to four more in the next 36 years), but they had only compiled a 1–4–1 record. This was the third consecutive Rose Bowl appearance for Stanford's class of 1936 players, nicknamed the "Vow Boys".

SMU had a record of 12–0 and was top-ranked with a defense that had shut out their opponents in eight of 12 games. This was their second-ever bowl game (the Mustangs had played in the 1925 Dixie Classic) but their first marquee bowl appearance.

== Game summary ==
Not wanting to lose for the third consecutive time in the Rose Bowl, Stanford strove to score first, which they did with Bill Paulman's touchdown run in the first quarter. The rest of the game was a defensive struggle (which is why two ends were named MVP), highlighted by Stanford's six interceptions and SMU's crucial fumble at Stanford's five-yard line. In the end, there were 355 combined yards, but also 25 combined punts and only 15 first downs.

== Scoring ==
=== First Quarter ===
- Stan – Bill Paulman, 1-yard run (Moscrip kick good)

== Game notes ==
The game was the first sellout for the Rose Bowl Game with all 84,784 seats filled with a large portion of fans from Texas to watch their Mustangs play. According to the Pasadena Tournament of Roses, there was a request for additional 200,000 tickets.
