= Bob "Bones" Hamilton =

American football player (1912–1996)

Profile
- Position: Halfback

Personal information
- Born: September 8, 1912; Sewickley, Pennsylvania, U.S.
- Died: April 1, 1996 (aged 83); Palm Springs, California, U.S.
- Listed height: 5 ft 10 in (1.78 m)
- Listed weight: 185 lb (84 kg)

Career information
- High school: Sewickley HS (PA); Kiski Prep (PA)
- College: Stanford (1933–1935)

Awards and highlights
- First-team All-American (1934); First-team All-PCC (1934); Second-team All-PCC (1935); Stanford Athletics Hall of Fame (1954)
- College Football Hall of Fame (Class of 1972)

Robert Alexander "Bones" Hamilton (September 8, 1912 – April 1, 1996) was an American gridiron football player, best known for playing college football for Stanford University. He was elected to the College Football Hall of Fame in 1972.

== Biography ==
Hamilton was born in Sewickley, Pennsylvania, and attended Sewickley High School. He then enrolled at Kiski Prep in the fall of 1930, and arrived at Stanford University in the fall of 1932, along with Kiski classmate Jim "Monk" Moscrip. Hamilton, Moscrip, Bob "Horse" Reynolds, and Bobby Grayson played for Stanford's freshman football team during the 1932 season. After the 1932 Stanford varsity was soundly defeated by the USC Trojans, the freshmen players got together and decided that they would never lose to USC, with Hamilton calling it a vow—the team came to be known as the "Vow Boys."

Hamilton played for the Stanford Indians (as they were then known) varsity teams of 1933–1935, as a halfback. He was named to the 1934 College Football All-America Team by one of the selectors of the era, Liberty magazine, and was elected captain of the 1935 Stanford team. Stanford reached the Rose Bowl Game each season that Hamilton played, losing twice before winning against SMU in the January 1936 edition, his final game for Stanford.

In a 1934 newspaper article, Hamilton explained the origin of his nickname: at Kiski, he had been called "Ham", which became "Ham and eggs", which got changed to "Hambone", which was shortened to "Bone", and finally became "Bones".

In the 1936 NFL draft, Hamilton was selected by the Brooklyn Dodgers, but he did not play professional football. He appeared in one movie, the 1936 film The Big Game, along with several other players of the era including Moscrip. When the winless 1939 Stanford team was losing at halftime in their final game of the season, Hamilton was asked to give a halftime pep talk—he told the downtrodden players, "You are by far and large the worst group of players who have ever worn the Stanford red." The insult motivated the team to score 14 unanswered points, resulting in their only win of the season. Hamilton served as an assistant coach at Stanford during 1940–1941.

During World War II, Hamilton served in the United States Navy, having been commissioned as a lieutenant in naval procurement. In early 1951, he acquired a Buick dealership in Van Nuys, California, which operated under his name into the mid-1970s. Hamilton was selected to the Stanford Athletics Hall of Fame in 1954, and the College Football Hall of Fame in 1972.

Hamilton wed Bernice Walters in October 1936 in Reno, Nevada. The end of their marriage is unclear. (Note: As of October 1964, Mrs. Bernice Walters Hamilton was living in North Hollywood, Los Angeles.) In July 1967, Hamilton married his second wife, Florence—the widow of W. Clarke Swanson, a son of Carl A. Swanson—she died in April 1988. Hamilton died in 1996, aged 83; he was survived by a son.
