= 1933 All-Pacific Coast football team =

American all-star college football team

The 1933 All-Pacific Coast football team consists of American football players chosen by various organizations for All-Pacific Coast teams for the 1933 college football season. The organizations selecting teams in 1933 included the Associated Press (AP), the Newspaper Enterprise Association, and the United Press (UP).

== All-Pacific Coast selections ==
=== Quarterback ===
- Cotton Warburton, USC (AP-1; NEA-1; UP-1)
- Phil Sarboe, Washington State (AP-2)

=== Halfbacks ===
- Red Franklin, Oregon State (AP-1; NEA-1; UP-1)
- George Wilson, St. Mary's (AP-1; UP-1)
- Arleigh Williams, California (AP-2; UP-2)
- Mark Temple, Oregon (AP-2)
- Frank Sobrero, Santa Clara (UP-2)

=== Fullback ===
- Mike Mikulak, Oregon (AP-1; NEA-1; UP-1)
- Bobby Grayson, Stanford (AP-2 [fullback]; NEA-1 [halfback]; UP-2 [quarterback])
- Joe Paglia, Santa Clara (UP-2)

=== Ends ===
- Bill Smith, Washington (AP-1; NEA-1; UP-1)
- Monk Moscrip, Stanford (AP-1; NEA-1; UP-2) (College Football Hall of Fame)
- Fred Canrinus, St. Mary's (AP-2; UP-1)
- Ford Palmer, USC (AP-2; UP-2)

=== Tackles ===
- Ade Schwammel, Oregon State (AP-1; NEA-1; UP-1)
- Larry Lutz, California (AP-1; NEA-1; UP-2)
- Carl Jorgensen, St. Mary's (AP-2; UP-1)
- Bob Reynolds, Stanford (AP-2) (College Football Hall of Fame)
- Boone, California (UP-2)

=== Guards ===
- Bill Corbus, Stanford (AP-1; NEA-1; UP-1) (College Football Hall of Fame)
- Aaron Rosenberg, USC (AP-1; NEA-1; UP-1)
- Larry Stevens, USC (AP-2; UP-2)
- Ed Gilbert, St. Mary's (AP-2)
- Henry Hayduk, Washington State (UP-2)

=== Centers ===
- Larry Siemering, Univ. of San Francisco (AP-1; UP-1)
- Lee Coates, UCLA (NEA-1)
- Howard Christie, California (AP-2)
- Bernie Hughes, Oregon (UP-2)

== Key ==
AP = Associated Press, selected as the "consensus of leading officials, coaches and sports writers" with ballots from over 50 observers from all parts of the West

NEA = Newspaper Enterprise Association

UP = United Press

Bold = Consensus first-team choice of a majority of the selectors listed above

== See also ==
- 1933 College Football All-America Team
