= Mikulak =

Mikulak is a surname. Notable people with this surname include:

- Sam Mikulak (born 1992), American artistic gymnast
- Mike Mikulak (1912–1999), American football player
- Stephen A. Mikulak (1948–2014), American politician
