= Bobby Grayson =

American football player (1914–1981)

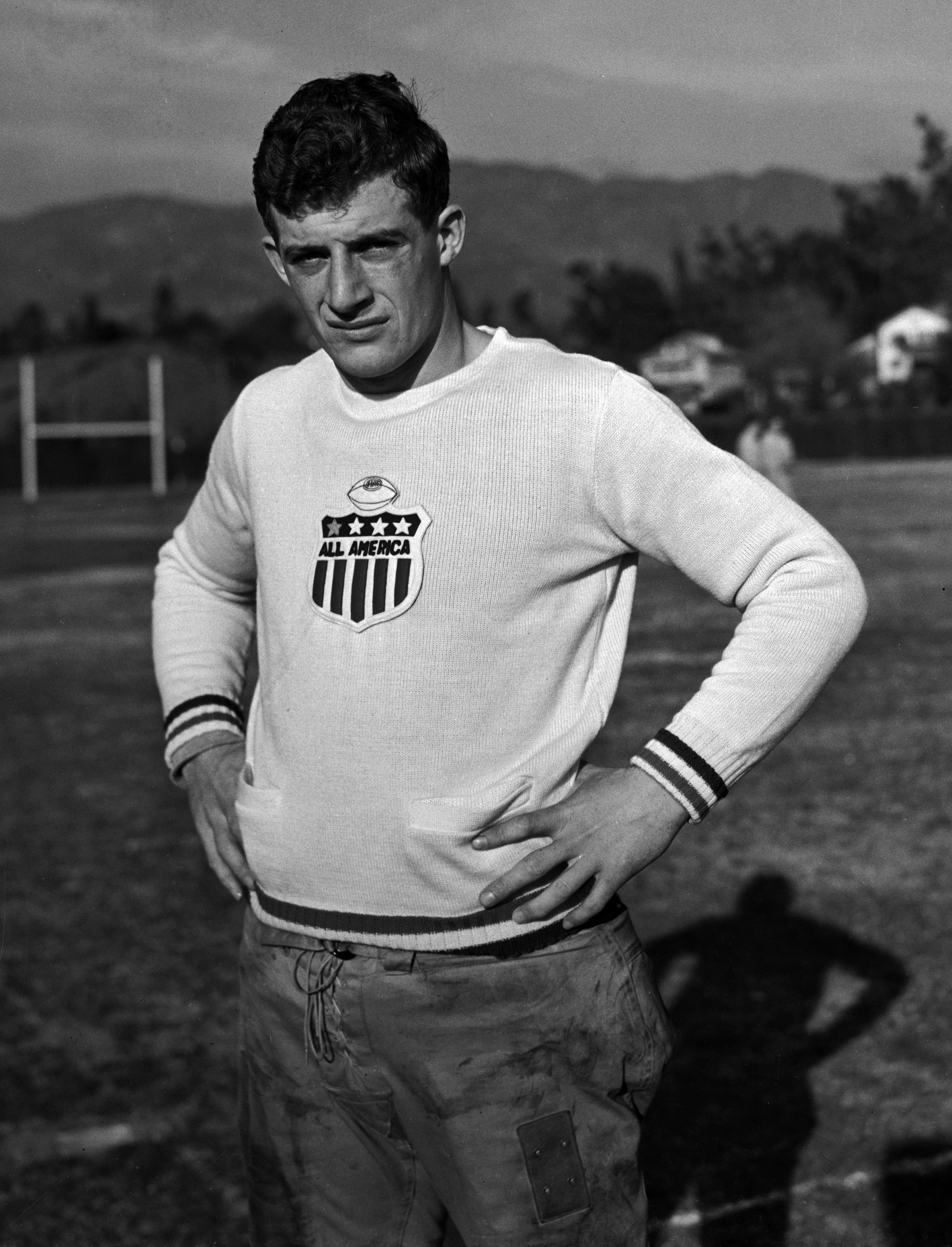
- Grayson in December 1934

Profile
- Position: Fullback
- Class: 1936

Personal information
- Born: December 8, 1914; Portland, Oregon, U.S.
- Died: September 22, 1981 (aged 66); Bellevue, Washington, U.S.
- Listed height: 5 ft 11 in (1.80 m)
- Listed weight: 195 lb (88 kg)

Career information
- High school: Jefferson (OR)
- College: Stanford (1933–1935)

Awards and highlights
- Unanimous All-American (1935); Consensus All-American (1934); Second-team All-American (1933); 3× First-team All-PCC (1933, 1934, 1935)
- College Football Hall of Fame (Class of 1955)

Robert Harry Grayson (December 8, 1914 – September 22, 1981) was an American football player. He was a two-time consensus All-American player who led the Stanford University football team to three consecutive Rose Bowl Games from 1933 to 1935.

At Stanford, Grayson played for the varsity football team in the 1933, 1934 and 1935 seasons. He was recruited to Stanford by Coach Glenn "Pop" Warner and helped lead Stanford to a Pacific Coast Conference title in 1934 and co-championships in 1933 and 1935. He was a consensus All-American in both 1934 and 1935.

== Early life ==
Born in Portland, Oregon, Grayson was a football, track and baseball star at Jefferson High School. He was state 100-yard dash champion in 1931 at 10.1 seconds, and again in 1932 in 9.9 seconds with a career best of 9.8 seconds. Grayson also won the 220-yard low hurdles state championship twice, in 1931 he won in 26.6 seconds, and again in 1931 in 25.5 seconds. In football, he was a four year letterman playing fullback and defense while leading Jefferson to the 1931 City title and allowed no scores by opponents. In 1932, he was recruited to play football at Stanford by their legendary coach Pop Warner.

== College career ==
Grayson's 1932 freshman team also included Bob "Horse" Reynolds, Jim "Monk" Moscrip, and Bob "Bones" Hamilton, and came to be known as the "Vow Boys". The 1932 Stanford varsity team was soundly defeated by the USC Trojans (USC). After watching the defeat, the freshmen players got together and vowed that they would never lose to the Trojans. In November 1933, Stanford defeated USC, and Grayson scored the Indians only touchdown. Time magazine reported that "Stanford's speedy Fullback Bobby Grayson slashed and passed through the Trojan line, punched over a touchdown", resulting in a "resounding crash" for "the fattest Humpty Dumpty of 1933 football." The Stanford team proceeded to beat USC three straight years from 1933 to 1935 – making good on the vow. Stanford was the dominant team on the Pacific Coast, appearing in the New Year's Day Rose Bowl game in each of those three years. In three seasons, Grayson was part of a Stanford team that compiled a 25–4–2 record and became the first team to play in three consecutive Rose Bowls.

In the 1934 Rose Bowl, Grayson rushed for 152 yards, a Rose Bowl record. Ernie Nevers said Grayson was "the best back I've ever seen." Grayson set numerous Stanford records. He set the record for most interceptions in a single game with four (two of which he returned for touchdowns) in a 1934 game against the University of Washington. His career total of 1,547 rushing yards in 405 carries established a Stanford record that stood for 20 years. A historical account of Grayson's accomplishments published by the LA84 Foundation notes:

Bobby Grayson had the looks of a matinee idol; and he remains as one of the most publicized players in Pacific Coast football history. A member of the legendary 'Vow Boys' of Stanford, Grayson starred from 1933–1935 in an era that is regarded as the greatest in the school's gridiron history. A workhorse ball carrier from the fullback spot, Grayson combined speed and power in piling up the school's career reusing record that stood for nearly two decades. Grayson used sprinter-class speed in sweeping the ends, and his swivel-hipped moves eluded tacklers in the open field.; while he was as adept at battering up the middle and punishing opposing defensive lines.

Sportswriter Grantland Rice wrote of Grayson:

Here is a big, fast back who can run an end, hit a line, kick, pass, block and handle any assignment given him.

Grayson was the 21st player drafted in the 1936 NFL draft — the inaugural NFL draft. He was drafted by the Pittsburgh Pirates but did not play professional football.

== Military service ==
Grayson served as commanding officer of the minesweeper USS Loyalty in the Pacific during World War II.

== Legacy ==
Grayson died of a heart ailment in 1981 at age 66 in Bellevue, Washington. He was survived by his wife, Sue Grayson, and a son, Dan Grayson.

In 2003, the Oakland Tribune ranked Grayson as one of Stanford's top ten players of all time, ranking him at number five behind Ernie Nevers, Jim Plunkett, Frankie Albert, and John Elway.
