= 1932 All-Pacific Coast football team =

American all-star college football team

The 1932 All-Pacific Coast football team consists of American football players chosen by various organizations for All-Pacific Coast teams for the 1932 college football season. The organizations selecting teams in 1932 included the Associated Press (AP), the Newspaper Enterprise Association, and the United Press (UP).

== All-Pacific Coast selections ==
=== Quarterback ===
- Orville Mohler, USC (NEA-1; UP-1)
- Homer Griffith, USC (AP-1)
- Gus Castro, California (AP-2)
- Wee Willie Smith, Idaho (NEA-2)
- John Cherberg, Washington (UP-2)

=== Halfbacks ===
- George Sander, Washington State (AP-1; NEA-1; UP-1)
- Hank Schaldach, California (AP-1; NEA-1)
- Bill Sim, Stanford (UP-1)
- Ernie Caddel, Stanford (AP-2; NEA-2)
- Hal Moe, Oregon State (AP-2; UP-2)
- Homer Griffith, USC (UP-2; NEA-2)

=== Fullback ===
- Joe Keeble, UCLA (NEA-1)
- Angelo Brovelli, St. Mary's (California) (AP-1; UP-2)
- Max Krause, Gonzaga (UP-1)
- Mike Mikulak, Oregon (AP-2; NEA-2)

=== Ends ===
- Dave Nisbet, Washington (AP-1; NEA-1; UP-1)
- Ray Sparling, USC (NEA-1; UP-2)
- Frank Slavich, Santa Clara (AP-1; UP-1)
- Ford Palmer, USC (AP-2; UP-2; NEA-2)
- Bill Smith, Washington (AP-2)
- Don Colvin, Stanford (NEA-2)

=== Tackles ===
- Tay Brown, USC (AP-1; NEA-1; UP-1)
- Ernie Smith, USC (AP-1; NEA-1; UP-1)
- Dick Tozer, California (AP-2; NEA-2)
- John Ransome, California (AP-2)
- Bill Morgan, Oregon (UP-2; NEA-2)
- Schwammell, Oregon State (UP-2)

=== Guards ===
- Bill Corbus, Stanford (AP-1; NEA-1; UP-1) (College Football Hall of Fame)
- Aaron Rosenberg, USC (AP-1; NEA-1; UP-2) (College Football Hall of Fame)
- Mike Steponovitch, St. Mary's (UP-1; AP-2)
- Bill O'Brien, Washington (AP-2; NEA-2)
- Sam Gill, California (UP-2; NEA-2)

=== Centers ===
- Bernie Hughes, Oregon (NEA-1; UP-1)
- Lee Coates, UCLA (AP-1; NEA-2)
- Howard Christie, California (AP-2)
- Howard, Washington (UP-2)

== Key ==
AP = Associated Press

NEA = Newspaper Enterprise Association, based on "tabulation of the choices of sports writers on Pacific Coast"

UP = United Press, selected by staff writers matching their opinions with those of coaches, players and other critics

== See also ==
- 1932 College Football All-America Team
