= Bob Reynolds (American football, born 1914) =

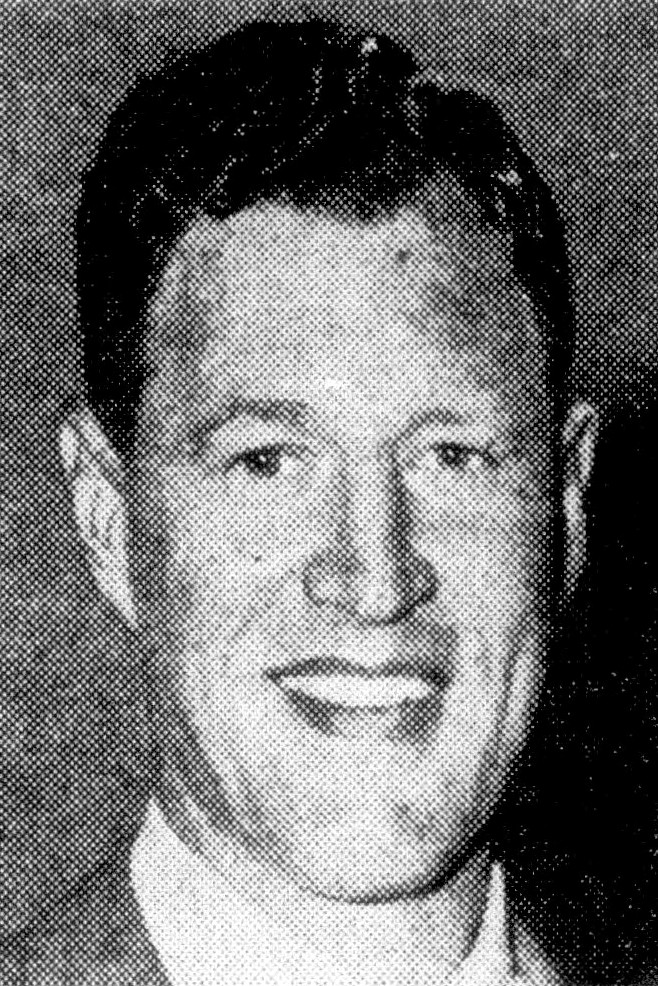
- Bob Reynolds, circa 1950

No. 24
- Position: Tackle

Personal information
- Born: March 30, 1914; Morris, Oklahoma, U.S.
- Died: February 8, 1994 (aged 79); San Rafael, California, U.S.
- Listed height: 6 ft 4 in (1.93 m)
- Listed weight: 221 lb (100 kg)

Career information
- High school: Okmulgee (OK)
- College: Stanford
- NFL draft: 1936: 6th round, 52nd overall pick

Career history
- Detroit Lions (1937–1938)

Awards and highlights
- Consensus All-American (1934); Second-team All-American (1935); 2× First-team All-PCC (1934, 1935); Second-team All-PCC (1933)

Career NFL statistics
- Games played: 20
- Games started: 16
- Stats at Pro Football Reference
- College Football Hall of Fame

Robert O'Dell "Horse" Reynolds (March 30, 1914 – February 8, 1994) was an American professional football player and businessman in radio and professional sports. He was inducted into the College Football Hall of Fame and is the only player ever to play in every minute of three consecutive Rose Bowl games (1934–1936). Reynolds was an All-American tackle who played for Stanford University from 1933 to 1935. After two years in the National Football League (NFL) with the Detroit Lions, Reynolds went into the broadcasting business and became general manager of the 50,000-watt KMPC radio station. He formed a partnership with Gene Autry in 1952 and served as the president of Golden West Broadcasting. He was also a founder, co-owner and president of the California Angels Major League Baseball team from 1960 to 1975.

== Early life ==
Reynolds was born and raised in Okmulgee, Oklahoma. He was a star athlete at Okmulgee High School before enrolling at Stanford University in 1932. Reynolds was a large man, standing 6 feet 4 inches (1.93 m) tall and weighing between 225 and 250 pounds (102 and 113 kilograms). At Stanford, Reynolds played for the varsity football team in the 1933, 1934 and 1935 seasons.

In 1932, Reynolds played for Stanford's freshman football team. The team included Reynolds, Bobby Grayson, Jim "Monk" Moscrip and Bob "Bones" Hamilton, and came to be known as the "Vow Boys." The 1932 Stanford varsity team was soundly defeated by the USC Trojans. After watching the defeat, the freshmen players got together and vowed that they would never lose to the Trojans. The Stanford team proceeded to beat USC three straight years from 1933 to 1935, making good on the vow. Stanford was the dominant team on the Pacific Coast, appearing in the New Year's Day Rose Bowl Game in each of those three years. Reynolds established a record that has never been matched by playing in every minute of three consecutive Rose Bowl games. In each of those games, Reynold played all 60 minutes on offense and defense without substitution. Two years after Reynolds completed the feat, Los Angeles Times sports columnist Braven Dyer wrote:

"A young man arrived in town yesterday enjoying perhaps the most unique distinction in the history of the Tournament of Roses football. He is the only athlete who ever played through three consecutive Rose Bowl games without substitution. His name is Bob Reynolds. You may recall him as 'Horse' Reynolds. … Reynolds left the field that afternoon with no fanfare or trumpets but on January 1, 1936, he set a record which may never be equalled in this annual classic. He was never removed for a substitute during any of the three games."

While playing at Stanford, Reynolds acquired the nickname, "The Horse." While most observers assumed that the nickname was derived from Reynolds' size and strength, it was actually based on a prank directed at Reynolds during his freshman year at Stanford. When Reynolds left campus for a weekend, a group of classmates led a horse up the steps of the dormitory and into Reynolds' room. The horse remained in the room until Reynolds returned on Monday morning, by which time the horse had eaten through the drapes and all of Reynolds' notebooks and some of his textbooks. From that day forward, Reynolds was known as "The Horse."

He was a consensus All-American at the tackle position in 1934, receiving that designation from the Associated Press, International News Service (later merged into UPI), and the New York Sun. In 1935, he was again selected as a first-team All-American tackle by the New York Sun. The profile of Reynolds at the College Football Hall of Fame referred to Reynols as "the plow which dug deep furrows in enemy defenses," and also noted that he "knocked people down like they were wooden statues."

== Later life ==
After "deciding he'd had enough football," Reynolds moved to Texas and Oklahoma and worked in the oil business in 1936 and 1937. Reynolds had been drafted by the Green Bay Packers, but decided not to play professional football. In 1937, G.A. Richards, a millionaire radio station owner who also owned the Detroit Lions, invited Reynolds to come to Detroit to talk things over. Reynolds told Richards he had no interest in playing for the Lions, but noted that he did have an interest in working at Richards' Los Angeles radio station KMPC. Richards proposed a coin toss. If Richards called it right, Reynolds would play two years for the Lions and work at KMPC in the off-seasons. If Reynolds called it right, he would have the radio job without any obligation to play for the Lions. Richards won the coin toss, and Reynolds signed a double contract — to play football for the Lions in the fall and to work for KMPC in the off-seasons.

Reynolds played 20 games as a tackle for the Lions in 1937 and 1938. During the offseason in 1938, Reynolds joined the sales staff of Richards' Los Angeles radio station KMPC. In 1942, Reynolds was named vice president and general manager of KMPC. When Reynolds joined KMPC, it was a small 5,000-watt station. In 1947, KMPC received approval from the FCC to increase its broadcasting power to 50,000 watts, making it Southern California's most powerful independent radio station.

In May 1951, G.A. Richards died leaving the station under the management of Reynolds and Loyd Sigmon — the KMPC engineer who developed the traffic Sig Alert. Reyolds contacted Gene Autry and advised that he had the inside track to acquire the station and its valuable real estate holdings from Richards' widow. Autry and Reynolds acquired the station together and founded Golden West Broadcasting. Golden West eventually owned and operated KMPC radio and KTLA television in Los Angeles and KSFO in San Francisco. Reynolds served for many years as the president of Golden West Broadcasting. Reynolds also served two terms as the president of the Southern California Broadcasters Association. (Reynolds was no relation to the Bob Reynolds who served as sports director and Lions announcer for Detroit station WJR for many years.)

In 1960, Reynolds and Autry founded the Major League Baseball expansion team the Los Angeles Angels. At the time that he and Autry received the franchise for the American League's new Los Angeles franchise, Reynolds described his transition to a "baseball man" and his long relationship with Autry:

"'My transformation into the town's No. 1 baseball fan,' he grinned, 'occurred the minute we were given the franchise, and I found out I had a little personal investment at stake.' … 'I'd known Gene for at least 15 years, and we always hoped to own a radio station together,' explained Bob. 'We satisfied that ambition with the acquisition of KMPC in 1952. Now we have a baseball team, and we're out to make it the best.'"

Reynolds served as president and co-owner of the Angels from the team's first season in 1961 until 1974. He stepped down as president of the Angels and sold his 20% ownership interest to Autry at the Winter Meetings on December 2, 1974.

In 1961, Reynolds was inducted into the College Football Hall of Fame. At the time, Reynolds said, "A fellow has to be lucky to be so honored. My good fortune was being able to play on great teams with fellows like Monk Moscrip, Bones Hamilton, Bobby Grayson and the rest."

In August 1966, Reynolds was honored with a night in his honor at a California Angels ballgame. At the time, Los Angeles Times columnist John Hall wrote:

"The contributions and the accomplishments of the large man with the large smile have too long been taken for granted.. As a partner of Gene Autry, it is natural perhaps that his role would be overshadowed by the glamor of a movie box office king. … But those closest to the scene will tell you it is Reynolds who is the dynamo of the gang ..."

Reynolds was also a co-owner, vice president and a director of the Los Angeles Rams football team from 1963 until 1972. In 1966, Reynolds led a group of five Rams owners, each representing 8.16% of the shares, in advocating the establishment of an NFL franchise playing at Anaheim Stadium in Orange County, California. The Rams would eventually move to Anaheim for the 1980 season.

Reynolds also served for 16 years as a member of the University of California Board of Regents. He was also a member of the 1984 Los Angeles Olympic Organizing Committee.

In 1972, Reynolds received the Distinguished American Award from the National Football Foundation and Hall of Fame.

Reynolds died in 1994 at age 79 in San Rafael, California. He was survived by his wife, Elizabeth, and three sons, Chris, Dan and Kirk.

== See also ==
- 1934 College Football All-America Team
- 1935 College Football All-America Team

Sporting positions
| Preceded by Franchise established | Los Angeles/California Angels president 1960–1974 | Succeeded by Arthur "Red" Patterson |
