= 1933 All-America college football team =

Official list of the best college football players of 1933

The 1933 All-America college football team is composed of college football players who were selected as All-Americans by various organizations and writers that chose All-America college football teams in 1933. The eight selectors recognized by the NCAA as "official" for the 1933 season are (1) the All-America Board, (2) the Associated Press (AP), (3) Collier's Weekly, as selected by Grantland Rice, (4) the International News Service (INS), (5) Liberty magazine, (6) the Newspaper Enterprise Association (NEA), (7) the North American Newspaper Alliance (NANA), and the United Press (UP). The only unanimous selections were center Chuck Bernard of Michigan and quarterback Cotton Warburton of USC.

== Consensus All-Americans ==
For the year 1933, the NCAA recognizes eight published All-American teams as "official" designations for purposes of its consensus determinations. The following chart identifies the NCAA-recognized consensus All-Americans and displays which first-team designations they received.

Name	Position	School	Number	Official	Other
Chuck Bernard	Center	Michigan	9/9	AAB, AP, CO, FWAA, INS, LIB, NANA, NEA, UP	CNS, CP, DJW, MP, NYS, WC, WD
Cotton Warburton	Quarterback	USC	9/9	AAB, AP, CO, FWAA, INS, LIB, NANA, NEA, UP	CNS, CP, DJW, MP, NYS, WC, WD
Joe Skladany	End	Pittsburgh	8/9	AAB, AP, CO, FWAA, INS, LIB, NANA, NEA	CNS, CP, DJW, NYS, WC, WD
Bill Corbus	Guard	Stanford	8/9	AAB, AP, CO, FWAA, INS, LIB, NANA, NEA	CNS, CP, DJW, NYS, WC, WD
George Sauer	Halfback	Nebraska	8/9	AAB, AP, CO, FWAA, INS, LIB, NANA, NEA	CNS, DJW, MP, WC, WD
Beattie Feathers	Halfback	Tennessee	7/9	AAB, CO, FWAAA, INS, LIB, NANA, NEA	CNS, CP, DJW, NYS, WC, WD-1
Fred Crawford	Tackle	Duke	6/9	AP, CO, INS, LIB, NANA, UP	CNS, CP, MP, WD
Aaron Rosenberg	Guard	USC	5/9	AAB, CO, INS, NEA, UP	CNS, MP, NYS, WC, WD
Duane Purvis	Fullback	Purdue	5/9	AAB, CO, LIB, NANA, UP	WC, WD
Francis Wistert	Tackle	Michigan	4/9	AAB, CO, FWAA, UP	CNS, DJW, NYS, WC
Bill Smith	End	Washington	3/9	AAB, LIB, NANA	MP, WC
Paul Geisler	End	Centenary	2/9	AP, UP	WD

== All-American selections for 1933 ==
=== Ends ===
- Joe Skladany, Pittsburgh (College Football Hall of Fame) (AAB; AP-1; CO-1; FWAA; INS-1; LIB; NANA-1; NEA-1; UP-3; CNS; CP-1; DJW-1; NYS-1; WC-1; WD-1)
- Paul Geisler, Centenary (AP-1; CO-2; INS-2; UP-1; CP-3; WD-1)
- Bill Smith, Washington (AAB; AP-2; CO-3; INS-3; LIB; NANA-1; NEA-2; UP-2; MP-1; WC-1; WD-2)
- Ted Petoskey, Michigan (AP-2; CO-2; INS-1; NANA-2; UP-2; CP-1; MP-1)
- Frank Larson, Minnesota (CO-1; INS-2; NANA-2; NEA-1; CNS; NYS-1; WD-2)
- Edgar Manske, Northwestern (UP-1)
- Red Matal, Columbia (CO-3; FWAA; INS-3; CP-2; DJW-1)
- Jim Moscrip, Stanford (College Football Hall of Fame) (NANA-3; NEA-3; CP-2)
- Hugh Devore, Notre Dame (AP-3)
- Lester Borden, Fordham (AP-3)
- Fred Conrinus, St. Mary's (UP-3)
- Peter James Kopcsak, Army (CP-3)
- Clary Anderson, Colgate (NANA-3)
- Fitzhugh Lyons, Indiana University

=== Tackles ===
- Francis Wistert, Michigan (College Football Hall of Fame) (AAB; CO-1; FWAA; INS-2; NANA-2; UP-1; CNS; CP-2; DJW-1; NYS-1; WC-1)
- Fred Crawford, Duke (College Football Hall of Fame) (AP-1; CO-1; INS-1; LIB; NANA-1; UP-1; CNS; CP-1; MP-1; WD-1)
- Charles Ceppi, Princeton (AAB; AP-2; CO-3; FWAA; INS-1; LIB; NANA-1; NEA-2; UP-2; CP-1; DJW-1; WC-1; WD-2)
- Adolphe Schwammel, Oregon State (AP-1; INS-3; UP-3 [g]; MP-1)
- John Yezerski, St. Mary's (NEA-1)
- Charles Harvey, Holy Cross (AP-2; INS-2; UP-3; CP-2)
- Bud Jorgensen, St. Mary's (CO-2; INS-3; UP-2; NYS-1; WD-2)
- Art Buss, Michigan State (AP-3; CO-3; NEA-2)
- Cassius Gentry, Oklahoma (AP-3)
- Frank Walton, Pittsburgh (UP-3; NANA-3)
- Gail O'Brien, Nebraska (CP-3)
- George T. Barclay, North Carolina (AP-3 [g]; CP-3)
- Peter Mehringer, Kansas (CO-2)
- Lane, Princeton (NANA-2)
- Ted Rosequist, Ohio State (NANA-3)

=== Guards ===
- Bill Corbus, Stanford (College Football Hall of Fame) (AAB; AP-1; CO-1; FWAA; INS-1; LIB; NANA-1; NEA-1; UP-2; CNS; CP-1; DJW-1; NYS-1; WC-1; WD-1)
- Aaron Rosenberg, USC (College Football Hall of Fame) (AAB; AP-2; CO-1; INS-1; NANA-2; NEA-1; UP-1; CNS; CP-3; MP-1; NYS-1; WC-1; WD-1)
- Zud Schammel, Iowa (AP-1; CO-2; LIB; NANA-1; INS-2; UP-1; CP-2; WD-2)
- Thomas Hupke, Alabama (AP-2; CO-3; INS-3; NANA-3; NEA-2; UP-2; CP-1; WD-2)
- Larry Stevens, USC (FWAA; INS-3; DJW-1)
- Harvey Jablonsky, Army (AP-3; UP-3; NANA-3; NEA-2; INS-2; CP-2)
- Bill Volok, Tulsa (CO-2)
- Joseph Gailus, Ohio State (CO-3; NANA-2; MP-1)
- Bunny Burzio, Carnegie Tech (CP-3)

=== Centers ===
- Chuck Bernard, Michigan (AAB; AP-1; CO-1; FWAA; INS-1; LIB; NANA-1; NEA-1; UP-1; CNS; CP-1; DJW-1; MP-1; NYS-1; WC-1; WD-1)
- Johnny Dell Isola, Fordham (UP-3; CO-2; NANA-2; INS-2; CP-2; WD-2)
- Lee Coats, UCLA (AP-2; NEA-2)
- Roy Oen, Minnesota (UP-2; INS-3)
- Larry Siemering, San Francisco (AP-3)
- Tal Maples, Tennessee (CP-3)
- Mike Vuchinich, Ohio State (CO-3)
- Howard Christie, California (NANA-3)

=== Quarterbacks ===
- Cotton Warburton, USC (College Football Hall of Fame) (AAB; AP-1; CO-1; FWAA; INS-1; LIB; NANA-1; NEA-1; UP-1; CNS; CP-1; DJW-1; MP-1; NYS-1; WC-1; WD-1)
- Cliff Montgomery, Columbia (AP-3; UP-2; INS-2; CP-3)
- Joe Laws, Iowa (CO-2; NANA-2; INS-3; DW-2)
- Paul Johnson, Army (AP-2; NEA-2)
- Manning Smith, Centenary (UP-3)
- Deke Brackett, Tennessee (CP-2)
- Bobby Grayson, Stanford (CO-3; NANA-2 [fb])

=== Halfbacks ===
- Beattie Feathers, Tennessee (College Football Hall of Fame) (AAB; AP-2; CO-1; FWAA; INS-1; LIB; NANA-1; NEA-1; UP-2; CNS; CP-1; DJW-1; NYS-1; WC-1; WD-1)
- George Sauer, Nebraska (College Football Hall of Fame) (AAB; AP-1; CO-1; FWAA; INS-1; LIB; NANA-1 [fb]; NEA-1; CNS [fb]; CP-2; DJW-1; MP-1; WC-1; WD-1)
- Jack Buckler, Army (AP-1; CO-2; INS-2; NANA-2; NEA-1; UP-1; CNS; CP-1; MP-1; NYS-1; WD-2)
- Pug Lund, Minnesota (AP-1; CO-2; FWAA; INS-1; NANA-2; UP-2 [fb]; CP-1 [fb]; DJW-1; MP-1; WD-2 [fb])
- Red Franklin, Oregon State (AP-3; CO-3; INS-3; NEA-2; UP-1; WD-2)
- Herman Everhardus, Michigan (COL-3; INS-2; NANA-3 [qb]; NEA-2)
- Ed Danowski, Fordham (CO-2 [fb]; INS-2 [fb]; NANA-3; UP-3)
- Doug Nott, Detroit (UP-2; CP-3)
- George Wilson, St. Mary's (AP-3; UP-3; CP-2)
- Dixie Howell, Alabama (CP-3)
- Garrett LeVan, Princeton (NANA-3)

=== Fullbacks ===
- Duane Purvis, Purdue (AAB; AP-2 [hb]; CO-1 [hb]; INS-3 [hb]; LIB; NANA-1 [hb]; UP-1; CP-2 [hb]; WC-1; WD-1 [hb])
- Mike Mikulak, Oregon (AP-2; CO-3; INS-3; NANA-3; UP-3; NYS-1)
- Ralph Graham, Kansas State (NEA-2)
- Ralph Kercheval, Kentucky (AP-3; CP-3)

== Key ==
- **Bold** – Consensus All-American
- -1 – First-team selection
- -2 – Second-team selection
- -3 – Third-team selection

=== NCAA recognized "official" selectors ===
- AAB = All-America Board
- AP = Associated Press
- CO = Collier's Weekly, selected by Grantland Rice
- INS = Hearst Consensus All-American Selections, selected through an all-season survey of 210 of the country's coaches, sports writers, football officials and observers for the International News Service
- LIB = Liberty magazine
- NANA = North American Newspaper Alliance
- NEA = Newspaper Enterprise Association, selected by the NEA All-American Committee of coaches, including Jock Sutherland (Pitt), Noble Kizer (Purdue), Harry Mehre (Georgia), Bill Spaulding (UCLA), Ike Armstrong (Utah), Bo McMillin (Kansas State), and Fred Thomsen (Arkansas)
- UP = United Press

=== Other selectors ===
- CP = Central Press Association, as picked by football team captains
- NYS = New York Sun
- WC = Walter Camp Football Foundation
- DJW = Davis J. Walsh, sports editor of International News Service
- FWAA = Football Writers Association of American
- WD = Walter Dobbins, a consensus based on the selections of Collier's, the United Press, the Associated Press, the All America Board, the New York Sun, the North America Newspaper Alliance, and Hearst
- MP = Midweek Pictorial
- CNS = Consensus team based on combined selections of the United Press, Associated Press, NEA News Service and the Collier's Weekly team by Grantland Rice

== See also ==
- 1933 All-Big Six Conference football team
- 1933 All-Big Ten Conference football team
- 1933 All-Pacific Coast Conference football team
- 1933 All-SEC football team
- 1933 All-Southwest Conference football team
