= Arthur "Red" Patterson =

American baseball executive (1909–1992)

Red Patterson
- Born: February 1, 1909; Long Island City, Queens, New York City, USA
- Died: February 10, 1992 (aged 83); Fullerton, California, USA
- Education: New York University
- Occupation: Major League Baseball executive
- Years active: 1945–1985, 1985–1992

Arthur Edward “Red” Patterson (February 1, 1909 – February 10, 1992) was an American professional baseball executive who spent more than 40 years in Major League Baseball and served as club president of the California Angels from February 22, 1975, through October 20, 1977. A former sportswriter, he gained prominence as the director of public relations and promotions for the New York Yankees (1946 through 1954) and Brooklyn/Los Angeles Dodgers (1954 through 1974). In 1975, Patterson dubbed himself "the dean of sports promotions guys".

== Innovative sports promoter ==
In that role, Patterson supervised such innovations as the annual "Old-Timers' Day" at Yankee Stadium in 1947 (created to raise funds for the Babe Ruth Foundation, a charity formed that year by the gravely ill slugger to help under-privileged children), team yearbooks, and "Cap Day", one of the earliest examples of logo-bearing sports apparel merchandising—an idea initially scorned by his employers, the Yankees, themselves.

He also became known as for publicizing the term "tape-measure home run" to describe Mickey Mantle's mammoth blast at Washington's Griffith Stadium on April 17, 1953, which glanced off a beer billboard above the left-center field fence, sailed out of the stadium itself, and landed in a residential neighborhood beyond. Patterson, who was in the press box that day, used the dimensions from home plate to the left-center-field wall—460 feet (140 m)—then added the distance he personally paced off from the stadium's exterior wall to where an eyewitness said he saw Mantle's blow land, and he estimated that the ball traveled 565 feet (172 m). Although that famous number has since been questioned by physicists, who have calculated the distance at anywhere between 510 feet (160 m) and more than 538 feet (164 m), Patterson's measurement has been "enshrined" at Cooperstown and remains fixed in the popular imagination.

Later, in his role as assistant general manager and PR director of the Brooklyn Dodgers in October 1957, Patterson read to the assembled media the club's official announcement that it would abandon Brooklyn and relocate to Los Angeles. Accompanying the Dodgers to Southern California, Patterson helped establish the team as a local institution, making at one point an estimated 300 speeches a year on its behalf and staging such as promotions as "Straight-A Students Night" at the Los Angeles Memorial Coliseum and Dodger Stadium.

Writing in 1985, the Los Angeles Times called Patterson "one of the most innovative and successful publicists and marketing executives in baseball." By that time, he had been associated with 13 pennant-winning teams in his 40 years in baseball—seven with the Dodgers and six with the Yankees.

== Early life and journalism career ==
Born in Long Island City, in the borough of Queens, Patterson initially worked as a journalist while he attended night classes to earn a degree from New York University. As a baseball "beat writer" for the New York Herald-Tribune, he was a chronicler of Lou Gehrig's historic May 2, 1939, decision in Detroit to take himself out of the Yankees' lineup after playing 2,130 consecutive games. Gehrig, then 35, was suffering from the early effects of ALS, the disease that would take his life two years later.

== Career in baseball ==
Patterson was 36 when he moved from covering baseball teams to promoting them. He initially worked in the office of National League president Ford Frick in 1945. Then, after a year, he was hired by the promotions-conscious president of the Yankees, Larry MacPhail, where, placed in charge of the Bombers’ publicity department, his creative instincts were at first given full rein. However, by the early 1950s, Patterson found himself having to defend his "Cap Day" brainchild to MacPhail's staid successor as the Yankees’ front-office boss, George Weiss.

"In those days, the Yankees didn't even have souvenir stands," Patterson told Sports Illustrated in 1975. "They didn't want to sell baseball caps in the stadium, because they thought it would lower the dignity of the cap. I'm not talking about giving the caps away the way we do now. I'm talking about selling them. When I first suggested we do this, George Weiss looked shocked. 'Red,' he said, 'we don't want every kid in town running around with a Yankee cap on.' Then I looked shocked. 'Why in the heck not?' I said."

Patterson's final achievement in baseball came in 1975, when he was appointed the second team president in Angels franchise history by owner Gene Autry. He remained in the role for three full baseball seasons before stepping aside for Autry himself. He then served the Angels as assistant to the chairman of the board (Autry) and PR consultant until his death, a tenure interrupted only by a brief resignation in 1985.

Patterson died from cancer in Fullerton, California, at the age of 83 on February 10, 1992. He was interred in Holy Sepulchre Cemetery in Orange, California.

Sporting positions
Preceded by Robert O. Reynolds	California Angels president 1975–1977	Succeeded by Gene Autry
