= Bill Smith (American football, born 1912) =

American football player (1912–1999)

- Smith in 1936

No. 40
- Positions: End, defensive end, kicker

Personal information
- Born: January 3, 1912; Seattle, Washington, U.S.
- Died: June 20, 1999 (aged 87); Carmel, California, U.S.
- Listed height: 6 ft 1 in (1.85 m)
- Listed weight: 198 lb (90 kg)

Career information
- High school: Portage (WA)
- College: Washington

Career history
- Chicago Cardinals (1934–1939)

Awards and highlights
- All-Pro (1935); Pro Bowl (1939); First-team All-American (1933); First-team All-PCC (1933); Second-team All-PCC (1932)

Career statistics
- Games played: 64
- Starts: 41
- Receptions: 92
- Receiving yards: 1,612
- Touchdowns: 9
- Field goals made: 12 (Long = 44 yards)
- Extra points made: 24

William Arley Smith (January 3, 1912 – June 20, 1999) was an American professional football player for the Chicago Cardinals of the National Football League (NFL). He played college football for the Washington Huskies and was named the most valuable player of their 1933 team, having scored 46 points as a pass receiver and a kicker.

Smith was selected by the All-America Board, Liberty magazine, and the North American Newspaper Alliance as a first-team end on the 1933 College Football All-America Team.

Smith played professional football at the end position, offensively and defensively, for six seasons in the NFL with the Cardinals.
