= The Big Game (1936 film) =

1936 film

- Theatrical release poster
- Directed by: George Nicholls, Jr. Edward Killy (football scenes)
- Written by: Irwin Shaw
- Based on: The Big Game by Francis Wallace
- Produced by: Pandro S. Berman
- Starring: Philip Huston; James Gleason; June Travis; Bruce Cabot; Andy Devine
- Cinematography: Harry Wild
- Edited by: Frederic Knudtson
- Music by: Nathaniel Shilkret
- Production company: RKO Radio Pictures
- Distributed by: RKO Radio Pictures
- Release date: October 9, 1936
- Running time: 75 minutes
- Country: United States
- Language: English

The Big Game is a 1936 American sports drama film directed by George Nicholls, Jr. and produced by RKO Radio Pictures, which released the film on October 9, 1936. The screenplay was written by Irwin Shaw, adapted from the 1936 novel of the same name by Francis Wallace. The film stars Philip Huston, James Gleason, June Travis, Bruce Cabot and Andy Devine. Huston (1908–1980) was a respected New York stage actor, who also had prominent roles in a number of motion pictures and, later, acted in television productions, as well.

== Plot ==
Clark Jenkins is the star quarterback of Atlantic's college football team. He falls in love with classmate Margaret Anthony, whose father, Brad, is a newspaper sports columnist who disapproves of their romance.

A gambler and school booster, George Scott, has been discreetly giving money to Clark, as he has in the past for players like Pop, who could not have afforded to go to college otherwise. Clark's roommate and teammate, Cal Calhoun, snitches on him to Brad Anthony, who investigates and falsely concludes that Clark intends to deliberately lose a game for a payoff from gambling kingpin Blackie Dawson.

No such arrangement exists. However, with the big game against Erie coming up, Blackie kidnaps Clark to make sure Atlantic cannot win. Pop creates a distraction on the field to delay the proceedings while Margaret, George and an apologetic Cal rush to rescue Clark in time to play in the game.

== Cast ==
- Philip Huston as Clark Jenkins
- James Gleason as George Scott
- June Travis as Margaret Anthony
- Bruce Cabot as Cal Calhoun
- Andy Devine as Pop
- C. Henry Gordon as Brad Anthony
- John Harrington as Blackie

== Production ==
In April 1936 it was reported that RKO had purchased the rights to the serialized story, The Big Game, by Francis Wallace, which had appeared in Collier's magazine. On April 8 RKO announced that Pandro Berman would handle the producing duties. Later that month RKO hired a young author, Irwin Shaw, to pen the screenplay. Shaw had just seen the successful production of his first play on Broadway, Bury the Dead. In June the studio assigned Nicholls to direct, shortly after renewing his contract. Also in June, it was announced that Berman would be the producer, although it was initially reported that the director would be George Stevens.

The first casting announcement came in mid-June, when it was announced that four star football players for Stanford would be used in the film: Jim "Monk" Moscrip, Bob "Bones" Hamilton, Keith Topping, and Frank Alustiza. An MGM contract player, Bruce Cabot, was acquired on loan by RKO on July 1. Another non-professional actor, Bobby Wilson, was hired to play one of the football players in early July. Wilson was an All-American quarterback at Southern Methodist University. By mid-July, Philip Huston was known to be starring in the film. A successful stage actor, Huston would be making his film debut in The Big Game. The following day, on July 15, Barbara Pepper was announced as having what was described as the "second female lead" in the film. Within days it was announced that James Gleason, Frank M. Thomas, John Arledge and Margaret Seddon had been added to the cast. At the same time, several other All-American college football players were also listed as cast members: William Shakespeare of Notre Dame; and Jay Berwanger of University of Chicago. The female lead was filled when RKO obtained June Travers on loan from Warner Bros. At the same time it was announced that "Big Boy" Williams and Andy Devine had also been slotted to appear in the film.

Principal photography on the film began on July 25. The football sequences appearing in the film were shot at the Rose Bowl in Pasadena. After filming had begun, Billy Gilbert and Dick Elliot were also added to the cast. In mid-August, George Offerman, Jr. and Arthur Loft were added to fill minor roles in the production. On September 1, it was announced that The Big Game would be one of the first films released on the new 2,000 foot reel, which became the industry standard. During production, Devine and one of the football extras were injured during filming the football sequences, necessitating several days delay in the filming of their scenes. The film opened on October 9, with premieres in San Francisco, California, and Columbus, Ohio, after which it was in heavy demand by theater booking agents. The film was given a Class A-1 rating by the National Legion of Decency, making it appropriate for all audiences.

== Reception ==
Harrison's Reports gave the film a very favorable review, calling it "very good program entertainment", and saying its comedic and action elements were excellent. While stating that the ending was predictable, in spite of that they felt it was still thrilling. They particularly highlighted the performance of Devine, and the chemistry between Huston and Travis. Motion Picture Daily also gave the film a favorable review. They felt that the plot left something to be desired, but was more than made up for by the direction, both by Nicholls, and especially by Edward Killy, who handled the football sequences. They were positive about the acting, and also the use of real football players, and they highlighted the performances of Devine and Travis. The Motion Picture Herald called the film "worthwhile entertainment", and did not have the same issue with the plot as Harrison's and Motion Picture Daily, calling it a "well-grounded story". They also enjoyed the mixture of suspense and comedy. Motion Picture Magazine was not as impressed, giving the film only two out of a possible four "A"'s.

== See also ==
- List of American football films
