= 1933 All-Southwest Conference football team =

American college football all-star team

The 1933 All-Southwest Conference football team consists of American football players chosen by various organizations for All-Southwest Conference teams for the 1933 college football season. The selectors for the 1933 season included the Associated Press (AP).

== All Southwest selections ==
=== Backs ===
- Tom Murphy, Arkansas (AP-1 [QB])
- Cy Casper, TCU (AP-1 [HB])
- Bob Wilson, SMU (AP-1 [HB])
- John Kitchens, SMU (AP-1 [FB])

=== Ends ===
- Jim Tom Petty, Baylor (AP-1)
- Paul Rucker, Arkansas (AP-1)

=== Tackles ===
- Fred Lauterbach, Rice (AP-1)
- Charles Coates, Texas (AP-1)

=== Guards ===
- Bud Taylor, TCU (AP-1)
- Harold Clem, Baylor (AP-1)

=== Centers ===
- Bill Smith, Texas (AP-1)

== Key ==
AP = Associated Press

== See also ==
- 1933 College Football All-America Team
