= Aaron Rosenberg =

American football player and producer (1912–1979)

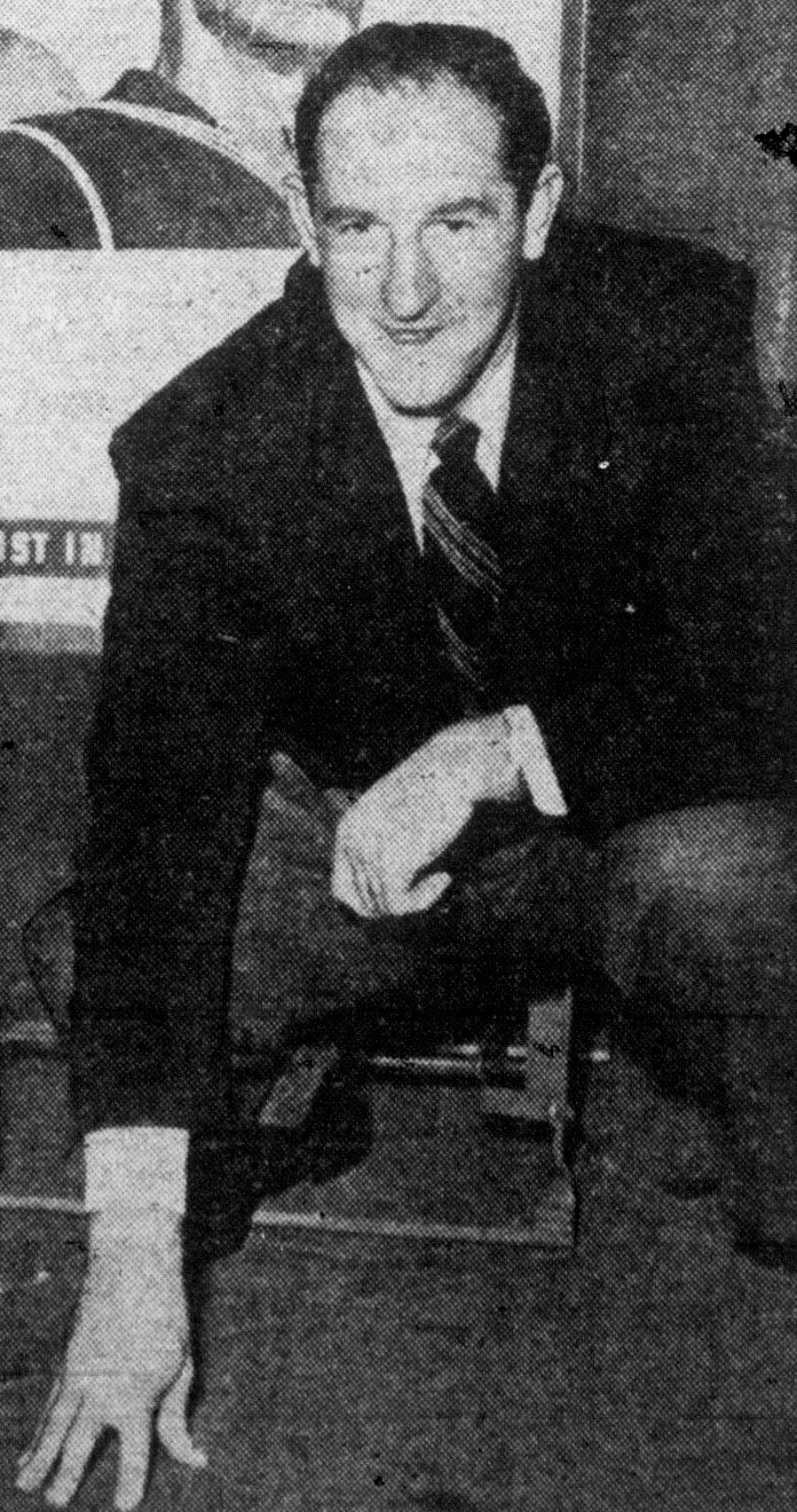
- Rosenberg, circa 1942
- Born: August 26, 1912; Brooklyn, New York, U.S.
- Died: September 1, 1979 (aged 67); Torrance, California, U.S.
- Occupations: Film and television producer
- Football career

USC Trojans
- Positions: Guard, tackle

Career information
- College: USC (1931–1933)

Awards and highlights
- 2× National champion (1931, 1932); Consensus All-American (1933); First-team All-American (1932); Third-team All-American (1931); 2× First-team All-PCC (1932, 1933)
- College Football Hall of Fame (Class of 1966)

Aaron "Rosy" Rosenberg (August 26, 1912 – September 1, 1979) was a two-time All-American college football player, and a film and television producer with more than 60 credits. He received a nomination for the Academy Award for Best Picture for Mutiny on the Bounty (1962) starring Marlon Brando.

== Football career ==
Born in Brooklyn, New York, and Jewish, he went to Fairfax High School in Los Angeles, where he played football for the Fairfax Lions. There he made the All-City Football Team four straight years.

He then majored in journalism at the University of Southern California and played college football for the USC Trojans. USC was 30-2-1 in his career, and won two national championships. He was a two-way offensive and defensive guard/tackle. USC’s unbeaten streak, with Rosenberg playing, was 27 games between 1931 and 1933. He was All-Conference and was selected for the All-American team in 1932 and 1933, named to both the 1932 College Football All-America Team and the 1933 College Football All-America Team.

He was elected to the College Football Hall of Fame in 1966, and the USC Athletic Hall of Fame in 1997. In 2010 he was inducted into the Southern California Jewish Sports Hall of Fame.

== Film career ==
Following his college career, he became an apprentice at 20th Century Fox in 1934 as an assistant director under producer Sol Wurtzel, where he worked until 1942. He spent time as a naval officer during World War II before joining Universal-International as an assistant director. He later became a producer, with his first film as producer being Johnny Stool Pigeon in 1949. He produced a wide range of films including Man Without a Star, directed by King Vidor and starring Kirk Douglas, To Hell and Back (1955) and The Benny Goodman Story (1956). In 1950, he produced Winchester '73 starring James Stewart and directed by Anthony Mann and produced other films involving them both including Bend of the River (1952), Thunder Bay (1953), The Glenn Miller Story (1954) and The Far Country (1955). He left Universal in 1957.

He spent five years at MGM and rescued Mutiny on the Bounty (1962) from production problems which took two years to make and for which he was nominated for the Academy Award for Best Picture as the producer. He then returned to Fox where he spent a further six years producing films including Fate Is the Hunter (1964), Morituri (1965), Do Not Disturb (1965) and 3 Frank Sinatra films - Tony Rome (1967), The Detective (1968) and Lady in Cement. He also executive produced the TV series Daniel Boone starring Fess Parker, that ran from 1964 to 1970.

He returned to Universal in 1969 where he made his last feature film, The Boy Who Cried Werewolf (1973). He retired after producing Reflections of Murder for television in 1974.

Director Budd Boetticher, who made Red Ball Express (1952) and The Man from the Alamo (1953) with Rosenberg, later called Rosenberg his "favorite producer of all time because he was so damn honest.... He and I had a lot of arguments because we both wanted to make better pictures than Universal wanted us to make."

== Personal life ==
He had a son and three stepchildren.

== Death ==
He died at age 67 in Torrance Memorial Hospital on September 1, 1979, after an extended illness.
