= Mike Mikulak =

American football player and coach (1912–1999)

- Mikulak in 1933

Profile
- Position: Fullback

Personal information
- Born: December 2, 1912; Minneapolis, Minnesota, U.S.
- Died: June 4, 1999 (aged 86); Woodland, California, U.S.
- Listed height: 6 ft 0 in (1.83 m)
- Listed weight: 210 lb (95 kg)

Career information
- College: Oregon

Career history
- Chicago Cardinals (1934–1936)

Awards and highlights
- Second-team All-American (1933); First-team All-PCC (1933); Second-team All-PCC (1932)

Career statistics
- Games played: 34
- Starts: 31
- Yards rushing: 446
- Yards receiving: 202
- Touchdowns: 4
- Stats at Pro Football Reference

Michael Nicholas "Iron Mike" Mikulak (December 2, 1912 – June 4, 1999) was an American football fullback who played three seasons in the National Football League (NFL) after starring collegiately for three years playing for the University of Oregon.

After his career in football, Mikulak became a career officer in the United States Army and later the United States Air Force, serving during World War II as the chief of military security in Casablanca and Rabat Morocco, Naples, Italy, and Southern France.

== Biography ==
=== High school and college athletics ===
Born in Minneapolis, Minnesota, Mikulak graduated from Edison High School in 1930, where he was named to All-City teams in football, baseball, and basketball as a senior.

He attended the University of Oregon in Eugene. Mikulak became Oregon's starting fullback and helped lead the Ducks to a 4–1 Pacific Coast Conference record in 1933, tying them with Stanford for the conference championship. (Stanford, however, received the bid to the 1934 Rose Bowl due to its victory over USC, the only team to beat the Ducks that year.) Mikulak was a two-time all-Pacific Coast Conference selection, and was a second-team All-American in 1933.

Mikulak earned the nickname "Iron Mike" because he wore an aluminum chest protector to protect a protruding sternum.

=== NFL career ===
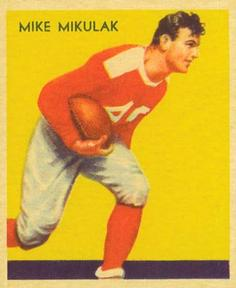

Mikulak signed with the Chicago Cardinals in 1934. He played three seasons in the NFL, quickly earning a reputation as a bruising fullback, and was named to the All-Pro team in his second season. Following the 1936 season, Mikulak retired from professional football and returned to the University of Oregon to become the backfield coach on his old team, and to complete his degree.

=== Military career ===
After his career in football, Mikulak entered the United States Army as a career officer, receiving his commission in February 1937. He was stationed at Fort Lewis in Washington state, assigned to the Third Army Division.

A member of the military police, Mikulak was a member of the Allied landing force in Morocco, serving as chief of security in Rabat and Casablanca. He also was a participant in the Allied invasion of Italy and was chief of security of Naples.

At the time of the end of the war, Mikulak was chief security officer for Southern France, headquartered in Marsailles. He returned to the United States in 1946 and was placed in command of a military police battalion at Fort Sheridan in Illinois. He was accepted into the newly created United States Air Force in 1947 and was assigned as a security officer in Omaha, Indianapolis, and Detroit.

In 1950, Mikulak was transferred to the Pentagon and sent to the Air Force's Air Command and Staff College. After his graduation from that institution in 1951, he was returned to Germany where he helped with the development of Ramstein Air Force Base.

Mikulak returned to the United States in 1955 and served as a wing commander in Denver, New York, and Atlanta. He retired in 1963 after a military career of 27 years with the rank of colonel.

Following his Army career, Mikulak received a Master's degree in educational administration from the University of Iowa in 1964, later working as director of several of that university's graduate programs until his retirement in 1978.

=== Personal and legacy ===
Mikulak was married with two children. He was also a father to six step-children.

Mikulak died in Woodland, California after a lengthy battle with leukemia on June 4, 1999. He was 86 years old at the time of his death.

He is a member of the Oregon Sports Hall of Fame and the University of Oregon Athletic Hall of Fame.
