= Paul Geisler =

American football player (1909–1956)

George Jennings
Biographical details
- Born: June 10, 1909; Berwick, Louisiana, U.S.
- Died: August 20, 1956 (aged 47)

Playing career
- 1932–1933: Centenary
- Position: End

Coaching career (HC unless noted)
- 1930s: Louisiana College (assistant)
- 1945: Eastern Flying Training Command

Head coaching record
- Overall: 6–3–1

Accomplishments and honors

Awards
- Consensus All-American (1933)

Paul Aubrey "Hoss" Geisler (June 10, 1909 – August 22, 1956) was an American football player and coach and educator. He played college football at Centenary College of Louisiana and was selected as a consensus first-team All-American in 1933.

== Biography ==
Geisler was born in Berwick, Louisiana, in 1909. He attended Morgan City High School. He then enrolled at Centenary College of Louisiana where he played at the end position for the undefeated 1932 and 1933 football teams. He was a consensus first-team selection to the 1933 College Football All-America Team. Geisler began his playing career as a back for the Centenary team, but became a star when he was moved to the end position. LSU coach Biff Jones said Geisler was as "fast as a streak."

Geisler later transferred to Louisiana College where he completed his undergraduate studies and also served as an assistant coach. He served in the Air Force during World War II, enlisting in 1943, attaining the rank of captain, and receiving his discharge in 1949. Both before and after the war, he worked as a high school coach at Lake Providence and Tallulah, Louisiana. He became a high school principal and later superintendent of schools at Lake Providence.

Geisler was married to Randle Johnson in 1936. He died of a brain tumor in 1956 at the age of 47. He was posthumously inducted into the Louisiana Sports Hall of Fame in 1967.

== Head coaching record ==
Year	Team	Overall	Conference	Standing	Bowl/playoffs
Eastern Flying Training Command Eagles (Independent) (1945)
1945	Eastern Flying Training Command	6–3–1			
Eastern Flying Training Command:		6–3–1			
Total:		6–3–1			
