= Mark Temple (American football) =

American football player (1911–1990)

Profile
- Position: Running back

Personal information
- Born: March 28, 1911; Pendleton, Oregon, U.S.
- Died: December 20, 1990 (aged 79)

Career information
- College: Oregon

Career history
- 1936: Boston Redskins
- 1936: Brooklyn Dodgers

Awards and highlights
- Second-team All-PCC (1933)

Mark Vernon Temple (March 28, 1911 – December 20, 1990) was an American football running back in the National Football League (NFL) for the Boston Redskins and the Brooklyn Dodgers. He played college football at the University of Oregon.
