= Bill Corbus =

American football player (1911–1998)

Profile
- Position: Guard / Kicker

Personal information
- Born: October 5, 1911; San Francisco, California, U.S.
- Died: January 8, 1998 (aged 86); San Francisco, California, U.S.

Career information
- High school: Vallejo (CA)
- College: Stanford (1931–1933)

Awards and highlights
- 2× Consensus All-American (1932, 1933); Second-team All-American (1931); 3× First-team All-PCC (1931, 1932, 1933)
- College Football Hall of Fame

William Corbus (October 5, 1911 – January 8, 1998) was an American gridiron football player and supermarket executive. Best known for playing college football for Stanford University, he was inducted to the College Football Hall of Fame in 1957.

== College career ==
Nicknamed "The Baby-Faced Assassin" due to his youthful appearance and athletic ferocity, Corbus, who acted as placekicker as well as offensive lineman, was Stanford's first two-time All-American in 1932 and 1933.

In 1933, Corbus kicked two late field goals to defeat USC 13–7, helping to fulfill a promise made by his teammates from the class of 1936—a group known as the Vow Boys—to never again lose to USC. That year, Corbus helped Stanford the first of three straight Rose Bowl Game appearances before graduating as an honor student and student body president.

== After football ==
Corbus played in the era before the NFL draft, and did not continue in professional football. He worked for the A&P grocery store chain, retiring as vice-chairman in 1977. He was inducted into the College Football Hall of Fame in 1957 and is a member of the Stanford Athletic Hall of Fame. His high school alma mater, Vallejo High School, named their football stadium for him. He died in San Francisco, California in 1998.
