= Cy Casper =

American football player (1912–1968)

No. 20, 99, 21
- Position: Back

Personal information
- Born: May 28, 1912; Memphis, Tennessee, U.S.
- Died: March 7, 1968 (aged 55); Fort Worth, Texas, U.S.
- Listed height: 6 ft 0 in (1.83 m)
- Listed weight: 190 lb (86 kg)

Career information
- High school: Harlandale (San Antonio, Texas)
- College: TCU

Career history
- Green Bay Packers (1934); St. Louis Gunners (1934); Pittsburgh Pirates (1935)

Awards and highlights
- First-team All-SWC (1933)

Career NFL statistics
- Rush attempts: 83
- Rushing yards: 201
- Rushing touchdowns: 1
- Catches: 10
- Receiving yards: 164
- Receiving touchdowns: 1
- Stats at Pro Football Reference

Charles Andrew "Cy" Casper (May 28, 1912 – March 7, 1968) was an American football back for the Green Bay Packers, St. Louis Gunners, and Pittsburgh Pirates of the National Football League (NFL). He played college football for TCU.

== Biography ==
Casper was born on May 28, 1912, in Memphis, Tennessee.

== Career ==
Casper played with the Green Bay Packers and the St. Louis Gunners during the 1934 NFL season. The following season, he played with the Pittsburgh Steelers.

He played at the collegiate level at Texas Christian University.
