= Joe Keeble =

American football player (1909–1984)

No. 9
- Position: Back

Personal information
- Born: August 29, 1909; Cleburne, Texas, U.S.
- Died: April 27, 1984 (aged 74); San Luis Obispo, California, U.S.
- Listed height: 6 ft 0 in (1.83 m)
- Listed weight: 190 lb (86 kg)

Career information
- High school: Oneonta (CA)
- College: UCLA (1930–1930)

Career history
- Westwood Cubs (1934–1936); Chicago Cardinals (1935)*; Pittsburgh Americans (1936); Cleveland Rams (1937)
- * Offseason or practice squad member only

Awards and highlights
- First-team All-PCC (1932)
- Stats at Pro Football Reference

Joseph Bailey Keeble (August 29, 1909 – April 27, 1984) was an American football back who played one season with the Cleveland Rams of the National Football League (NFL). He played college football at the University of California, Los Angeles. He was also a member of the Westwood Cubs, Chicago Cardinals and Pittsburgh Americans.

== Early life and college ==
Joseph Bailey Keeble was born on August 29, 1909, in Cleburne, Texas. He first enrolled at Holtville High School in Holtville, California before transferring to Oneonta Military Academy in South Pasadena, California.

Keeble joined the UCLA Bruins in 1930 and played football and basketball for them. He was on the freshman football team in 1930 and a letterman from 1931 to 1933. He earned first-team All-PCC honors as a fullback in 1932.

== Professional career ==
Keeble played for the Westwood Cubs from 1934 to 1936. He signed with the Chicago Cardinals in 1935 but did not appear in a game for the team. He played for the Pittsburgh Americans of the American Football League in 1936. Keeble played in seven games, starting two, for the Cleveland Rams during the 1937 season.

== Coaching career ==
Keeble was later head coach at Madera High School in Madera, California.

== Personal life ==
Keeble died on April 27, 1984, in San Luis Obispo County, California.
