= Bernie Hughes =

American football player (1910–1967)

- Hughes as a member of the Oregon Webfoots

No. 18
- Position: Center

Personal information
- Born: January 9, 1910; Dorris, California, U.S.
- Died: December 26, 1967 (aged 57); Medford, Oregon, U.S.
- Listed height: 6 ft 1 in (1.85 m)
- Listed weight: 190 lb (86 kg)

Career information
- High school: Medford (Medford, Oregon)
- College: Oregon

Career history
- Chicago Cardinals (1934–1936)

Awards and highlights
- All-Pro (1934); First-team All-PCC (1932); Second-team All-PCC (1933)

Career statistics
- Games played: 32
- Starts: 25

Bernard B. Hughes (January 9, 1910 – December 26, 1967) was an American football center who played professionally in the National Football League (NFL) for the Chicago Cardinals from 1934 to 1936. He played college football at the University of Oregon.
