= Sewickley High School =

Coordinates: 40.53440°N 80.17984°W

Sewickley High School in 1927

Sewickley High School is a historic American public school building that is located in Sewickley, Pennsylvania.

== History and architectural features ==
This public school's roots can be traced back to 1834, when it was located in an old log church. In 1894, a new building for the school was built, and was named as the Richardson Romanesque Sewickley Public School, often affectionately called the "yellow brick" school. It served as Sewickley High School's location until 1926, when the school was moved to a new location on Harbaugh street and renamed as Sewickley High School.

The old "yellow brick" building became Sewickley Elementary School, until it was razed in 1975.

Sewickley High School became a popular rival of Leetsdale High School. The school closed in 1956 when the Quaker Valley School District was formed, and the building was converted to a junior high school, known as Quaker Valley Junior High. It was then changed to Quaker Valley Middle School in 1997.

Since its closing, the building has undergone significant remodeling and has had two major additions. The "Sewickley High School" name still remains on the front entrance of the school.
