= Stanford Cardinal football =

American college football organization

2026 Stanford Cardinal football team
- First season: 1891; 135 years ago (Note: From 1905 to 1917, Stanford played rugby instead of football. In 1918, Stanford did not field an official team due to World War I, though an unofficial squad made up of volunteers from the Students' Army Training Corps stationed at Stanford (some of whom were not Stanford students) hurriedly organized to play several games, all blowout losses.)
- Athletic director: John Donahoe
- General manager: Andrew Luck
- Head coach: Tavita Pritchard; 1st season, 2–4 (.333)
- Location: Stanford, California
- Stadium: Stanford Stadium (capacity: 50,424)
- Field: Foster Field
- NCAA division: Division I FBS
- Conference: ACC
- Colors: Cardinal and white
- All-time record: 675–506–49 (.569)
- Bowl record: 15–14–1 (.517)

National championships
- Claimed: 1926, 1940

Conference championships
- PCC: 1924, 1926, 1927, 1929, 1933, 1934, 1935, 1940, 1951 Pac-12: 1970, 1971, 1992, 1999, 2012, 2013, 2015

Division championships
- Pac-12 North: 2011, 2012, 2013, 2015, 2017
- Heisman winners: Jim Plunkett – 1970
- Consensus All-Americans: 37
- Rivalries: California (rivalry); Notre Dame (rivalry); San Jose State (rivalry); USC (rivalry); UCLA (rivalry); Oregon (rivalry)

Uniforms
- Fight song: "Come Join The Band" (official) "All Right Now" (de facto)
- Mascot: None (Note: The Stanford Tree is the mascot of the Stanford Band.)
- Marching band: Leland Stanford Junior University Marching Band
- Outfitter: Nike
- Website: GoStanford.com

The Stanford Cardinal football program represents Stanford University in college football at the NCAA Division I FBS level and is a member of the Atlantic Coast Conference. The program was previously in the Pac-12 Conference. The team is known as the Cardinal, adopted prior to the 1982 season. Stanford was known as the "Cardinal" for its first two decades of athletic competition, then more commonly as the "Cardinals" until 1930. The name was changed to the "Indians" from 1930 to January 1972, and back to the "Cardinals" from 1972 through 1981. A student vote in December 1975 to change the nickname to "Robber Barons" was not approved by administrators.

Stanford has fielded football teams every year since 1892 with a few exceptions. Like a number of other teams from the era concerned with violence in the sport, the school dropped football in favor of rugby from 1906 to 1917. The school also did not field a team in 1918 (due to World War I) or in 1943, 1944, and 1945 (due to World War II).

The school participated in the first-ever Rose Bowl against Michigan in 1902, in which they were routed 49–0. Its annual Big Game against California is the oldest and most storied rivalry in the western United States. The Cardinal also compete for the Legends Trophy against independent rival Notre Dame.

The program has an all-time record of 664–478–49 for a winning percentage of .578 Stanford left the Pac-12 with winning series records against all of its Pac-12 North rivals, except for the Washington Huskies, against whom they are tied 43–43–4. Stanford claimed national championships in 1926 and 1940. In 1926, led by coach Pop Warner, the team was undefeated in the regular season and tied Alabama in the 1927 Rose Bowl. The 1940 team went unbeaten and untied after defeating Nebraska 21–13 in the 1941 Rose Bowl, but the team ranked No. 2 in the final AP poll released before the game was played.

Pop Warner's era predated the AP poll, but Stanford has finished at least one season in the Top 10 in six different decades under seven different coaches: Tiny Thornhill in 1934, Clark Shaughnessy in 1940, Chuck Taylor in 1951, John Ralston in 1970 and 1971, Bill Walsh in 1992, Jim Harbaugh in 2010, and David Shaw in 2011, 2012, and 2015. Shaw, as of the 2025 season, has the most wins of any Stanford coach in history. Stanford's most recent season finish in the top 5 was in 2015 after the No. 5 Cardinal dismantled Big Ten West Division Champion No. 6 Iowa Hawkeyes 45–16 in the 2016 Rose Bowl to finish with a record of 12–2 (Stanford's third 12-win season ever, after 2010 and 2012) and a final ranking of No. 3 in the final AP Poll and the final Coaches Poll (Stanford's highest AP Poll ranking since 1940 and its highest Coaches Poll ranking ever).

The Cardinal have played in 30 bowl games in their history, including 17 appearances in bowls now comprising the College Football Playoff, specifically 15 Rose Bowls (the third-most appearances of any team, behind only USC's 33 appearances and Michigan's 22), the 2011 Orange Bowl, and the 2012 Fiesta Bowl.

Quarterback Jim Plunkett is the only Stanford player to win the Heisman Trophy, doing so in 1970. Stanford players have finished second in Heisman voting six times: quarterback John Elway was second to Herschel Walker in 1982; running back Toby Gerhart was second to Mark Ingram II in 2009; quarterback Andrew Luck finished second to Cam Newton in 2010 and to Robert Griffin III in 2011; running back Christian McCaffrey finished second to Derrick Henry in 2015; and running back Bryce Love finished second to Baker Mayfield in 2017.

As of September 10, 2025, 271 former Cardinal have played in an NFL or AFL regular-season game.

== History ==
=== Early history (1891–1979) ===
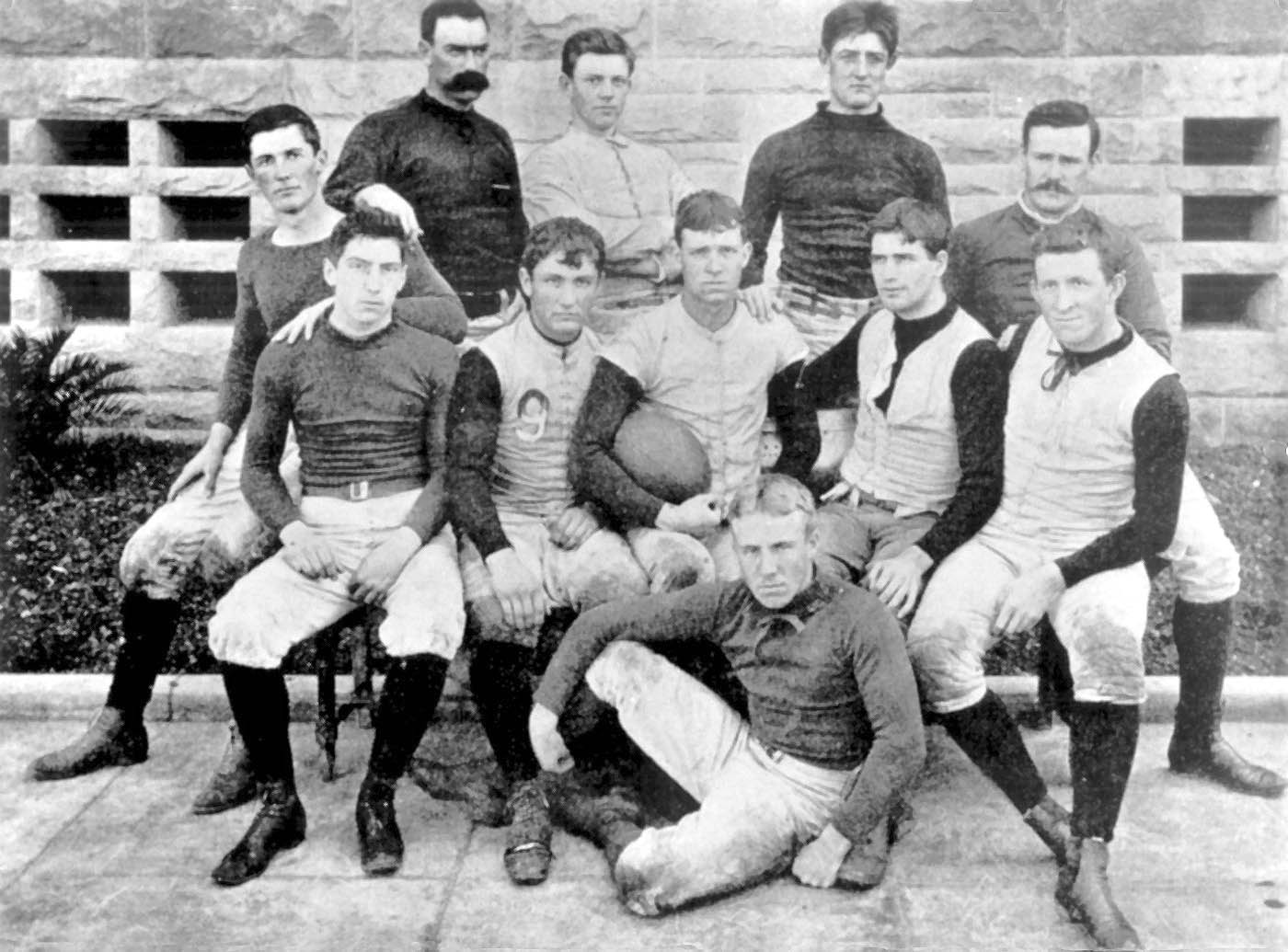
The Stanford team of 1892, that would play the first Big Game ever

Stanford first fielded a football team in 1891. The team was without a coach and only played a few games. Early football pioneer Walter Camp served as Stanford's head coach in 1892 and from 1894 to 1895. Football on the Pacific Coast had been on the rise since the late 1910s. (Note: At the 1917 Rose Bowl, the University of Oregon defeated University of Pennsylvania 14 to 0. While at the 1920 Rose Bowl, Oregon lost to one of the recognized national champions, Harvard, by one point: 6 to 7. The next year, Andy Smith's University of California team beat an undefeated Ohio State 28 to 0, making California the widely agreed national champions of the 1920 season.)

==== Pop Warner era ====
Early in 1922, Pop Warner signed a contract with Stanford University in which he would begin coaching in 1924, after his contract with Pitt expired. Health concerns, a significant pay raise and the rising status of Pacific Coast football made Warner make the big change. Years later, he wrote:

I felt my health would be better on the Pacific coast. Weather conditions at Pittsburgh during the football season are rather disagreeable, and much of the late season work had to be done upon a field which was ankle deep in mud. At the close of every season I would be in poor physical condition, twice being rendered incapable of coaching while I recuperated in a hospital. Doctors advised me that the climate of the Pacific coast would be much better for a man of my age and in the work in which I was engaged.

In 1924, Warner began his nine-year tenure at Stanford. (Note: Stanford was founded in 1887 and had fielded a football team every year since 1892, with the exception of 1906 to 1918, when football was dropped due concerns over the sport's increasing numbers of injuries and deaths. Along with other west coast schools the sport of rugby was played instead.) When he began coaching, Stanford was one of nine teams in the Pacific Coast Conference (PCC). Warner inherited a notable squad from the previous year, including Ernie Nevers (whom Warner considered his greatest player) and All-American ends Ted Shipkey and Jim Lawson.

A season highlight was the final game against Stanford's arch-rival California at California Memorial Stadium, the last game of the regular season. Before the game, both teams were undefeated and Stanford had not beaten California since 1905. (Note: In 1906, concerned with the growing levels of violence in football, both schools stopped playing American football and switched to rugby as their university's main sport. California switched back to football in 1915, with Stanford following in 1919.) Nevers did not play due to a broken ankle. Late in the game, California was leading 20–3; California coach Andy Smith, sure the game was over, began substituting regular players. Warner seized the opportunity to combine passing with the trick plays for which he was known (a fake reverse and a full spinner), and Stanford made a comeback. The game ended in a 20–20 tie.

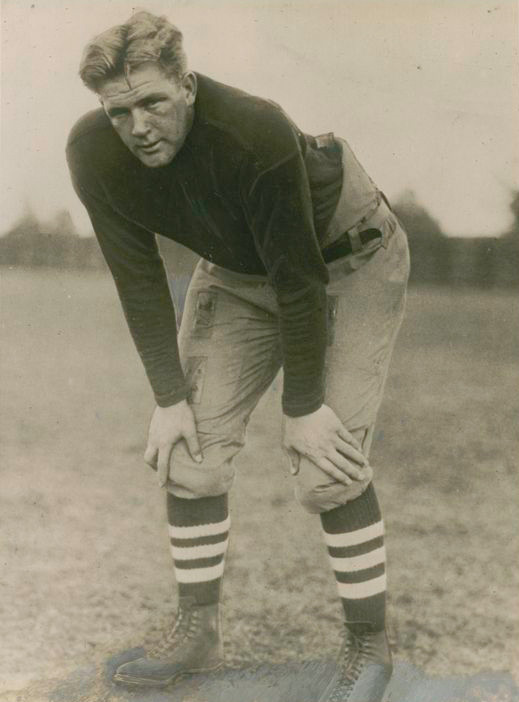
Warner called Ernie Nevers (pictured) his greatest player.

Because the game was California's second tie, Stanford was chosen to play in the Rose Bowl on New Year's Day against the University of Notre Dame's Fighting Irish coached by Knute Rockne. Like Warner, Rockne is considered one of the greatest coaches in football history. According to journalist Allison Danzig, "With the exception of Knute Rockne of Notre Dame, Pop Warner was the most publicized coach in football." The game was thus a test of two different and highly influential systems of football: "the Warner system with the wing backs, unbalanced line and gigantic power [and the] Knute Rockne system with its rhythmic, dancing shift, lightning speed, balanced line and finely timed blocking". Notre Dame's backfield was composed of the renowned Four Horsemen. Nevers played all 60 minutes of the game, and rushed for 114 yd (104 m) (more yardage than the Four Horsemen combined). Warner's offense moved the ball but was unable to score, and Notre Dame won 27–10.

During the 1925 season, Stanford lost just one PCC game (to Washington); California was finally defeated, 27–7. It was the first year of a new rivalry, with coach Howard Jones and the University of Southern California (USC) team. (Note: Jones won 1921 and 1922 Big Ten conference titles while heading the University of Iowa.) In their first game, at the Los Angeles Memorial Colosseum, Stanford scored twice in the first half but had to hold off the charging Trojans in a 13–9 win. Because of the loss to Washington, Warner's team was not invited to the Rose Bowl. Stanford won all its 1926 games, crushing California 41–7 and narrowly defeating USC 13–12. Warner's team was invited to the Rose Bowl to play Alabama. Like the game against the Fighting Irish, Stanford dominated but the result was a 7–7 tie. After the game, both teams were recognized as national champions by a number of publications. (Note: Parke H. Davis selected the Lafayette Leopards, coached by Herb McCracken, Warner's former player at Pittsburgh, as national champion.) The 1927 season was one of underachievement and ultimate success. Stanford lost its third game to non-conference St. Mary's College. Stanford's next loss was against non-conference Santa Clara. The game against USC was a 13–13 tie. However, that year, Stanford defeated California 13–6. The game included a bootleg play, the invention of which some credit to Warner. Powers stated that,

Stanford put the game on ice in the fourth period when Pop introduced the bootlegger play, which was to be widely copied and still is in use. On the original bootlegger, Warner made use of Biff Hoffman's tremendous hands. Hoffman would take the pass from center and then fake to another back. Keeping the ball, he would hide it behind him and run as though he had given it to a teammate. Sometimes defensive players would step out of Hoffman's path, thinking he was going to block. Hoffman "bootlegged" for the touchdown against California ...

Despite the two losses, Stanford finished the season as PCC co-champion. They were invited to the 1928 Rose Bowl against Pitt, Warner's former team now coached by protégé Jock Sutherland. Warner broke his losing Rose Bowl streak, defeating Sutherland 7–6. The win was Warner's last appearance at the Rose Bowl. The 1929 season is known for Warner's regular use of the hook and lateral, a play that involves a receiver who runs a curl pattern, catches a short pass and immediately laterals the ball to another receiver running a crossing route. According to the October 25, 1929 Stanford Daily, "The trickiness that Pop Warner made famous in his spin plays and passing is very evident ... The frosh have been drilling all week on fast, deceptive forward and lateral pass plays, and together with the reverses will have a widely varied attack". That season brought Warner his second straight loss to Jones, with Stanford defeated by the Trojans 7–0. USC won the conference, and went to the Rose Bowl. Jones went on to win every year thereafter, including 1932, Warner's last season at Stanford. Because of the five consecutive defeats, Warner was severely criticized by Stanford alumni. (Note: During Warner's latter years at Stanford, USC became the undisputed leader of the west, winning multiple national championships.) In all, Warner and Jones played eight games; Jones won five, Warner two and one was a tie. Against Stanford's main rival, California, Warner won five games, tied three and lost one.

==== Vow Boys ====
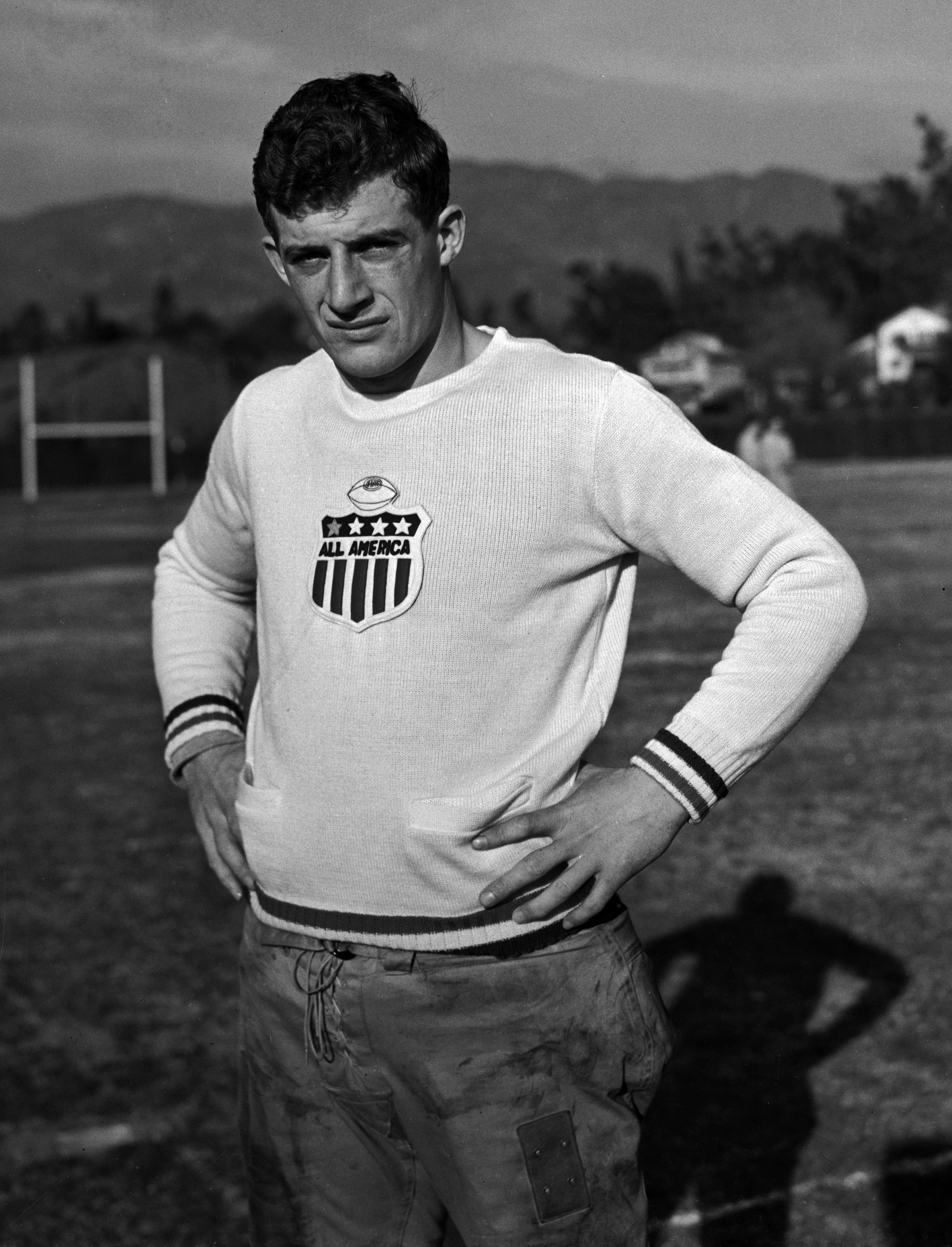
Bobby Grayson, one of the "Vow Boys"

After Pop Warner's departure, Claude E. "Tiny" Thornhill was promoted from line coach and named head coach prior to the 1933 season. Players of the Stanford class of 1936 had seen Stanford's 13–0 home loss to rival USC during their freshman season, 1932. This caused quarterback Frank Alustiza to proclaim, "They will never do that to our team. We will never lose to the Trojans." A few minutes later, Bob "Bones" Hamilton said, "Let's make that a vow." and the team became known as the "Vow Boys".

The press reported on the vow, but it was forgotten until the next fall—facing USC during Thornhill's first season, the Stanford varsity was suddenly called upon to make good on it. The team kept its pledge, winning each of their contests over USC: 13–7 in 1933, 16–0 in 1934, and 3–0 in 1935. Four of the Vow Boys — fullback Bobby Grayson, halfback "Bones" Hamilton, end Jim "Monk" Moscrip, and tackle Bob "Horse" Reynolds — were later inducted to the College Football Hall of Fame.

Other notable players whose careers overlapped with the Vow Boys included David Packard (class of 1934), who went on to co-found Hewlett-Packard, and Bill Corbus, a guard and kicker during the 1931–1933 seasons who was also inducted to the College Football Hall of Fame.

In his first three years, Thornhill led his Indians to the Rose Bowl Game each season. Thornhill was the first Stanford coach to lead his team to postseason play in his first three seasons, a feat not matched until David Shaw's 2011 to 2013 teams. Stanford lost the first two appearances, but won the 1936 Rose Bowl over SMU, 7–0. After those first three seasons, Thornhill's teams went steadily downhill, culminating in a 1–7–1 season in 1939, after which Thornhill was fired and replaced by Clark Shaughnessy. Shaughnessy coached the team for two seasons, posting an undefeated record for the 1940 season—that team ran the T formation and was nicknamed the "Wow Boys"—culminating with a win in the Rose Bowl over Nebraska.

==== World War II and later ====
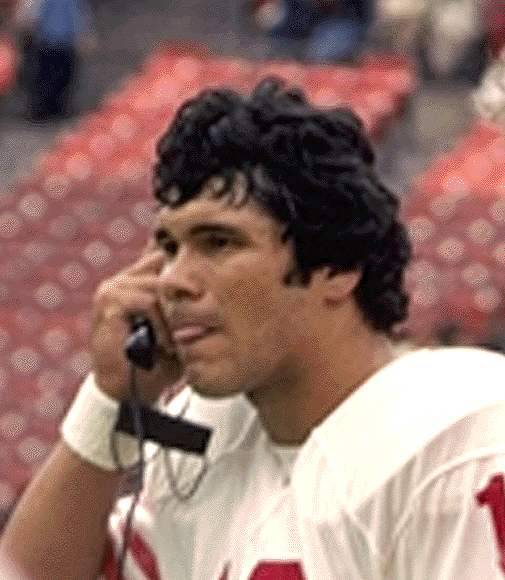
QB Jim Plunkett, winner of the 1970 Heisman Trophy

Marchmont Schwartz led Stanford's football program from 1942 to 1950 (Stanford did not field a football team from 1943 to 1945 because of World War II). During his tenure, Stanford made one bowl appearance, a win in the 1949 Pineapple Bowl. Chuck Taylor led Stanford's football team from 1951 to 1957. Taylor's 1951 team finished 9–2 and lost in the Rose Bowl. The tenure of Jack Curtice was a dismal one. The Indians compiled a record of 14–36 from 1957 to 1962, which included an 0–10 campaign in 1960.

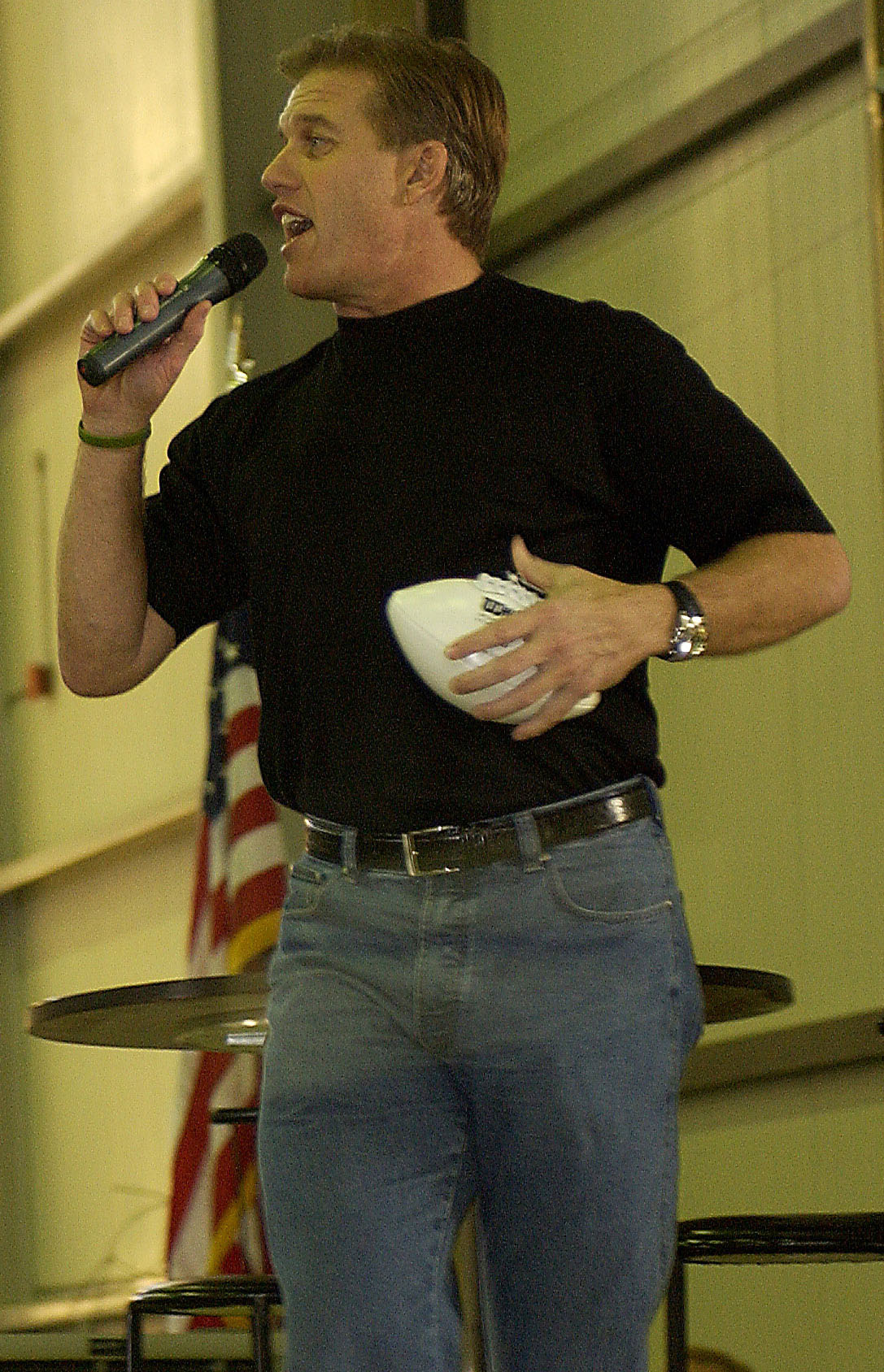
QB John Elway played at Stanford from 1979 to 1982

John Ralston came to Stanford in 1963 and helped revive a sagging program. Over nine seasons, Ralston guided the team back to national respectability while building a mark of 55–36–3. In his last two seasons, 1970–1971, Ralston's teams won two Pacific-8 titles and notched back-to-back Rose Bowl victories over Ohio State and Michigan, both of whom were undefeated coming into the Rose Bowl game. Under Ralston's tutelage, Stanford quarterback Jim Plunkett won the Heisman Trophy in 1970. Plunkett and a stout defense led the team to a 9–3 record in 1970, an effort which resulted in a Rose Bowl victory over No. 2 Ohio State, the program's 4th. Plunkett also won the Heisman trophy that season, and he remains the only Stanford player to receive the award. Stanford won the Rose Bowl again the following year, 13–12 over undefeated Michigan, as Stanford kicker Rod Garcia booted a 31-yard field goal with 12 seconds left in the game. Ralston left Stanford following the 1971 season to take his talents to the NFL, accepting the position of head coach for the Denver Broncos.

In January 1972, when Ralston left to coach the NFL's Denver Broncos, Jack Christiansen was promoted from assistant coach and hired as Stanford's head coach. Christiansen, whose hiring coincided with the university changing the school's nickname from Indians to Cardinals (shortened to Cardinal in 1981), spent five years as Stanford's head coach, compiling a winning record each year and a 30–22–3 overall record. He was criticized for starting Mike Cordova rather than Guy Benjamin at quarterback during the 1975 season and for switching between quarterbacks during the 1976 season. One day prior to the final game of the 1976 season, Stanford announced that it was terminating Christiansen as its head coach. Under Christianson, Stanford never had a losing season, though Christiansen's tenure was largely marked by mediocrity.

In 1977, Bill Walsh was hired as the head coach. He stayed for two seasons. His two Stanford teams were successful, posting a 9–3 record in 1977 with a win in the Sun Bowl vs. LSU, and 8–4 in 1978 with a win in the Bluebonnet Bowl. His notable players at Stanford included quarterbacks Guy Benjamin and Steve Dils, wide receivers James Lofton and Ken Margerum, linebacker Gordy Ceresino, in addition to running back Darrin Nelson. Walsh was the Pac-8 Conference Coach of the Year in 1977. Walsh left Stanford after the 1978 season to move to the NFL's San Francisco 49ers, where he would earn a reputation as one of the NFL's greatest head coaches of all time.

In 1979, Rod Dowhower was promoted from wide receivers coach to Stanford's head coach. In his lone season, Stanford compiled a record of 5–5–1. Future Pro Football Hall of Famer John Elway enrolled at Stanford in 1979. Elway became one of Stanford's most iconic and successful players; however, the team struggled during his tenure.

=== Paul Wiggin era (1980–1983) ===
New Orleans Saints defensive coordinator and former Kansas City Chiefs head coach Paul Wiggin was hired as head coach at his alma mater on February 1, 1980. Despite the presence of quarterback John Elway on the team during his first three years, Wiggin was unable to lead Stanford to a bowl game during his tenure and was dismissed following the 1983 season with a 16–28 record over four years. Wiggin's efforts to reach a bowl game had come agonizingly close in 1982, when his team fell victim to what simply became known as The Play on November 20. In an incredible finish against Cal, the school's arch-rival, Stanford, led by quarterback Elway, drove down the field to kick a go-ahead field goal with just seconds left. On the ensuing kickoff, Stanford's band came onto the field. Cal took advantage of the chaos by lateraling five times to score the winning touchdown. Elway's career culminated in that game's loss, a game Stanford athletic director Andy Geiger said cost Elway the Heisman Trophy. Wiggin was fired following a poor 1–10 campaign in 1983.

=== Jack Elway era (1984–1988) ===
Succeeding Wiggin as the Cardinal head coach was John Elway's father, Jack Elway, who came to Stanford from San Jose State. Under his tutelage, the Cardinal compiled a record of 25–29–2. The best season during the Elway era was an 8–4 campaign in 1986, which culminated in a loss in the Gator Bowl. That season would be the only winning campaign during Elway's tenure as head coach. He was dismissed after 3–6–2 season in 1988.

=== Dennis Green era (1989–1991) ===
In 1989, former Northwestern head coach Dennis Green left the 49ers, where he was serving as wide receivers coach, and took the head coaching position at Stanford, inheriting a team that had graduated 17 of its 21 starters from 1988. Green led the Cardinal from 1989 to 1991. During that time, his teams finished with an overall record of 16–18, going 3–0 in the Big Game against the California Golden Bears. In 1990, his Stanford team defeated the top-ranked Notre Dame in South Bend, Indiana. His tenure culminated with an 8–4 record (Stanford's best since 1986). A loss to Washington in the opening game of the season was the deciding factor for the Pac-10 championship. The Cardinal made an appearance in the 1991 Aloha Bowl, where his team lost to Georgia Tech on a last-minute touchdown. Green left Stanford after three seasons to accept the head coaching position with the NFL's Minnesota Vikings.

=== Walsh's return (1992–1994) ===
Bill Walsh returned to Stanford as head coach in 1992, leading the Cardinal to a 10–3 record and a Pacific-10 Conference co-championship. Stanford finished the season with an upset victory over Penn State in the Blockbuster Bowl on January 1, 1993, and a # 9 ranking in the final AP Poll.

However, some Cardinal football players vandalized George Segal's Gay Liberation sculpture in 1994, wherein with paint and wedged a bench in between the figures of the group. LGBT students at Stanford openly protested against the fact that this act could not be legally deemed a hate crime, as California's definition of a hate crime consists of the violation of an individual's (rather than an institution's) natural/civil liberties. After this and consecutive losing seasons, Walsh resigned that year from Stanford and retired from coaching.

=== Tyrone Willingham era (1995–2001) ===
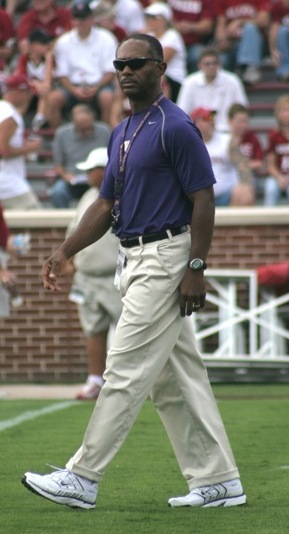
Tyrone Willingham

Despite lacking experience as a head coach or coordinator, Tyrone Willingham was appointed head coach of the football program at Stanford, succeeding Bill Walsh. In his seven seasons as head coach, he led the Cardinal to a 44–36–1 record and four bowl game appearances. In 2000, he was presented with the Eddie Robinson Coach of Distinction Award that is given annually to honor "an outstanding college football coach and role model for career achievement". His best team was the 1999 team, which won the school's first outright Pacific-10 Conference title in 29 years and appeared in the 2000 Rose Bowl. Willingham's 44 wins were the most by a Stanford coach since John Ralston. Troy Walters was arguably Stanford's best player during this time, receiving All-American honors and the Fred Biletnikoff Award in 1999, and setting school career records in receiving yards and receptions. Willingham left Stanford following the 2001 season to accept the head coaching position at Notre Dame.

=== Buddy Teevens era (2002–2004) ===
Buddy Teevens coached Stanford from 2002 to 2004. In his three years at the Farm, his teams posted a 10–23 record, beat BYU twice and San Jose State three times. However, Stanford failed to improve much during his tenure. Teevens went winless against rivals USC, Cal, and Notre Dame, and never posted a win against a team that finished the season with a winning record. Teevens was fired on November 29, 2004. The Associated Press noted that Teevens was "respected for his class and loyalty" and that he even appeared at the official announcement of his firing.

=== Walt Harris era (2005–2006) ===
Walt Harris was the head coach at Stanford for two seasons. In his first season as head coach there he posted a record of 5–6. In his second season as head coach the team posted a 1–11 record, the school's worst since going 0–10 in 1960. Harris was notorious for the extremely rare and bizarre decision to punt on 3rd down while trailing UCLA 7–0 on October 1, 2006, during his second season. He was fired on December 4, 2006, two days after Stanford's regular season ended. By the end of his tenure at Stanford, Harris had surpassed Jack Curtice with the lowest winning percentage in the history of Stanford football, with a .261 mark.

=== Jim Harbaugh era (2007–2010) ===
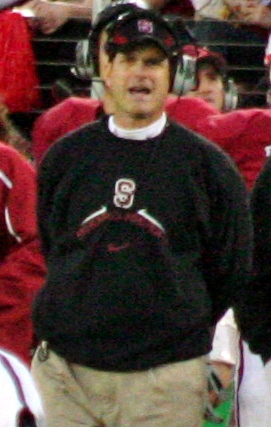
Coach Jim Harbaugh

Jim Harbaugh was named the head football coach at Stanford University in December 2006, replacing Walt Harris. Harbaugh's father, Jack, was Stanford's defensive coordinator from 1980 to 1981, while Harbaugh attended Palo Alto High School, located directly across the street from Stanford Stadium.

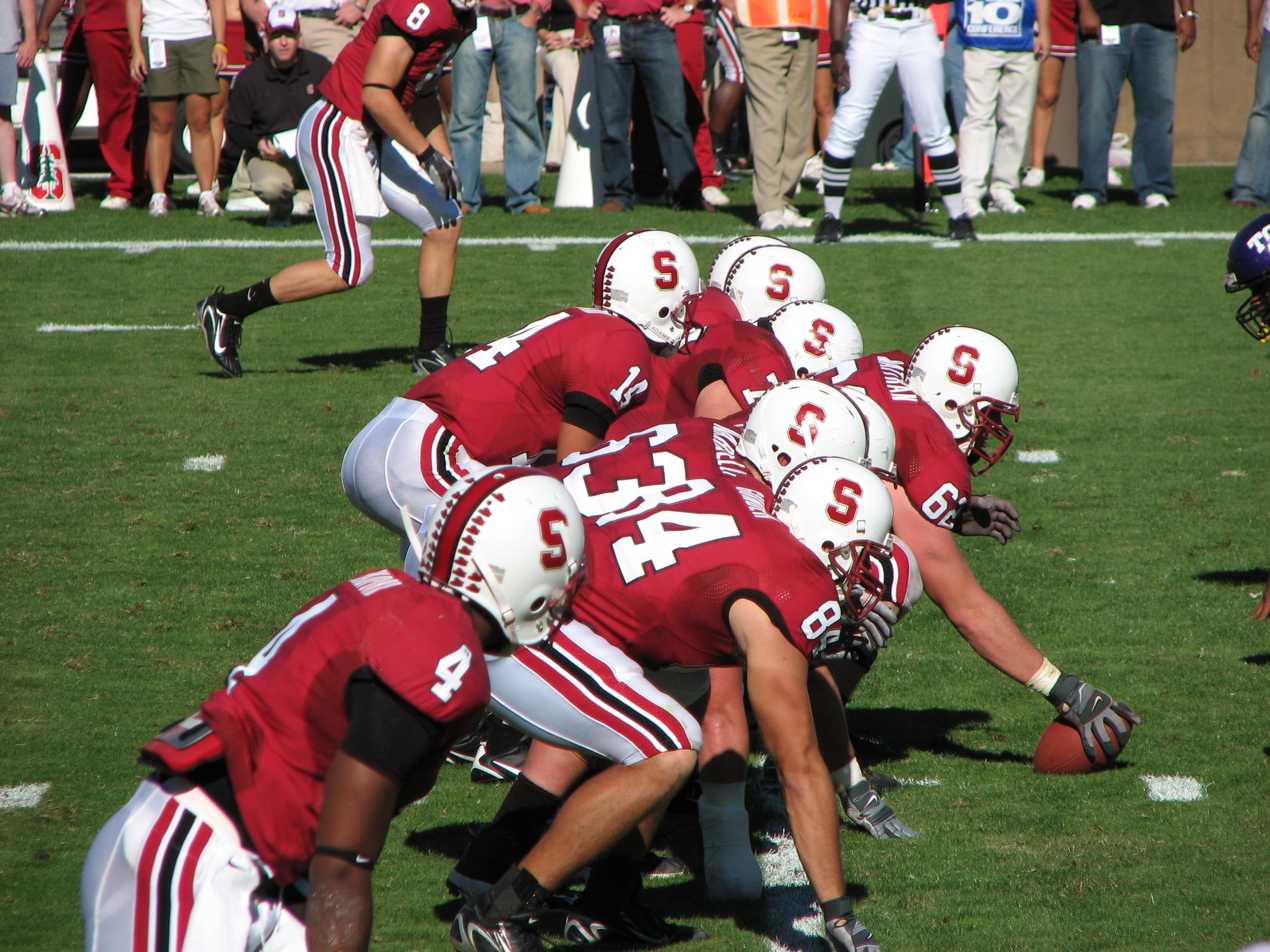
2007 offense lined up for a play

Harbaugh stirred some intra-conference controversy in March 2007, when he was quoted as saying rival USC head coach "Pete Carroll's only got one more year, though. He'll be there one more year. That's what I've heard. I heard it inside the staff." Upon further questions, Harbaugh claimed he had heard it from staff at USC. The comment caused a rebuke from Carroll. (In fact, Carroll would be at USC for three more years.) At the Pacific-10 Conference media day on July 26, 2007, Harbaugh praised the Trojans, stating "There is no question in my mind that USC is the best team in the country and may be the best team in the history of college football." The declaration, especially in light of his earlier comment, garnered more media attention. Later in the season, Stanford defeated No. 1 USC 24–23 with a touchdown in the final minute. With USC being the favorite by 41 points, it was statistically the greatest upset in college football history. Although Stanford lost to USC in 2008, Harbaugh and the Stanford Cardinal upset USC at home again with a score of 55–21 on November 14, 2009. Stanford's 55 points was the most ever scored on USC in the Trojans' history until Oregon scored 62 in a 62–51 win over USC on November 3, 2012. It was Pete Carroll's first November loss as USC head coach. Harbaugh never lost in USC's home stadium, the Los Angeles Memorial Coliseum. In January 2009, Harbaugh was confirmed to have been interviewed by the New York Jets for the head coach position, although the job was eventually offered to Rex Ryan.

In 2009, the Cardinal had a comeback season, finishing the regular season at 8–4, finishing No. 21 in the polls, and receiving an invitation to play in the 2009 Sun Bowl, the Cardinal's first bowl appearance since 2001. Running back Toby Gerhart was named a Heisman Trophy finalist, finishing second to Mark Ingram II in the closest margin of voting in Heisman history. On December 13, 2009, Harbaugh was rewarded with a three-year contract extension through the 2014 season. The 2010 season brought more success for Harbaugh and the Cardinal. The team went 11–1 in the regular season, with their only loss coming from Oregon, a team that was undefeated and earned a berth in the BCS National Championship Game. The first 11-win season in program history earned the Cardinal a No. 4 BCS ranking and a BCS bowl invitation to the Orange Bowl. Stanford defeated Virginia Tech 40–12 for the Cardinal's first bowl win since 1996 and the first BCS bowl victory in program history. Second year starting quarterback Andrew Luck was the runner-up to for the Heisman Trophy, the second year in a row that the runner-up was from Stanford. Harbaugh's 4-year record at Stanford was 29–21 (.580). Harbaugh was named the winner of the Woody Hayes Coach of the Year Award.

=== David Shaw era (2011–2022) ===
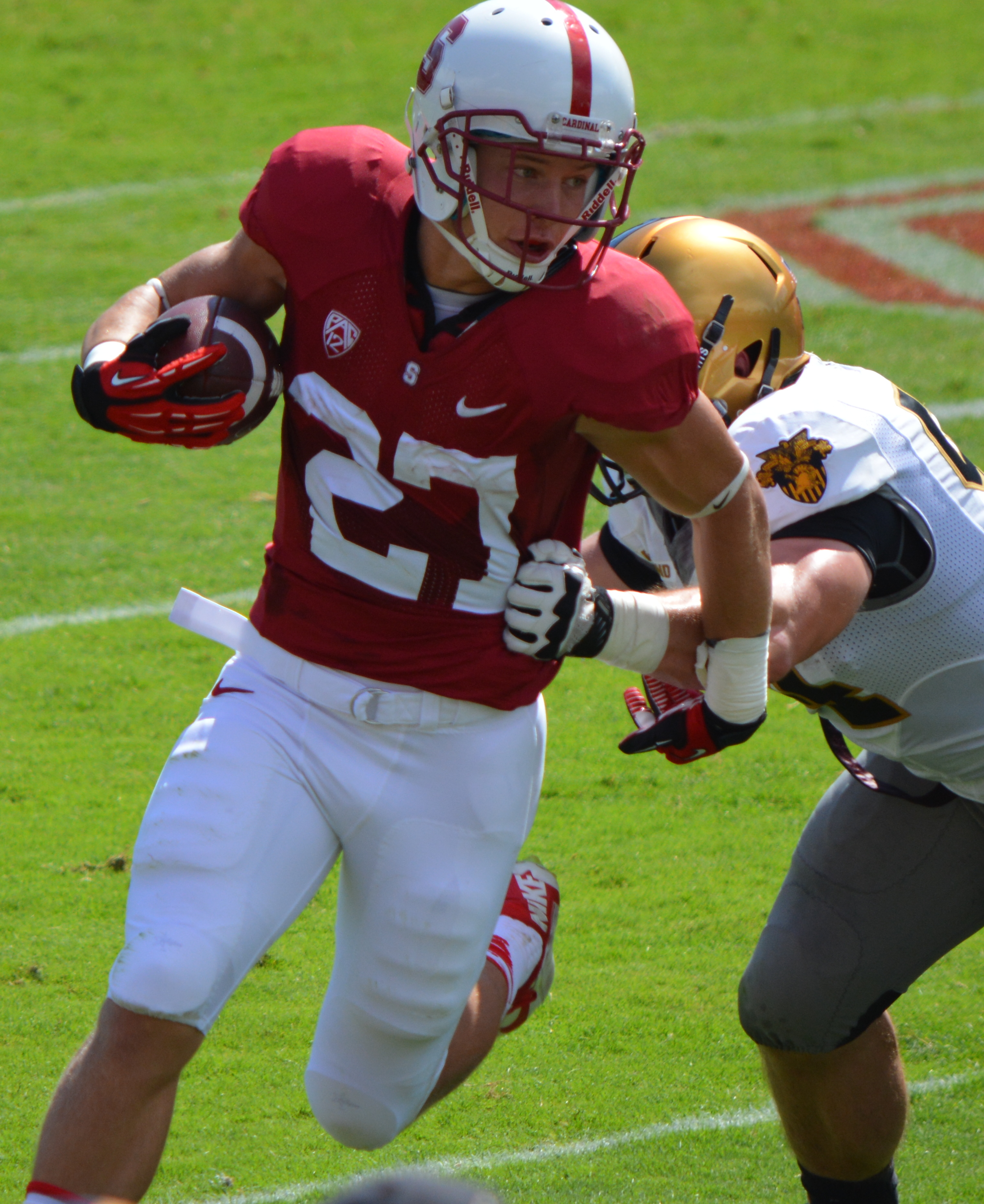
RB Christian McCaffrey

After Harbaugh left to coach the San Francisco 49ers, the team's offensive coordinator David Shaw became head coach. Shaw led the team to three consecutive BCS bowl games, including two Rose Bowls. The team was led by its quarterback, Andrew Luck, and its dominating defense. After Luck departed for the NFL draft, Kevin Hogan became the team's starting quarterback. Hogan led the team to a Rose Bowl victory over Wisconsin. The team returned to the Rose Bowl again the following year in the 2013 season, but lost a heart-breaker to Michigan State. After a rebuilding season in 2014, the 2015 season saw Shaw, Hogan, and Heisman runner up Christian McCaffrey lead Stanford to its third Pac-12 championship in four years, and consequently, its third Rose Bowl in four years. With the 2015 conference title, Shaw became the first Stanford coach in 80 years to win three conference titles and only the third ever in program history (after Tiny Thornhill from 1933 to 1935 and Pop Warner in 1924, 1926, and 1927). In 2017, Shaw once again led Stanford to a Pac-12 Championship appearance with Heisman runner up Bryce Love only to lose to rival USC. After two consecutive 3–9 seasons, Shaw resigned as head coach, effective immediately, on November 27, 2022, just over an hour after the end of Stanford's last game of the 2022 season.

=== Troy Taylor era (2023–2024) ===
Former Sacramento State football coach Troy Taylor was named the 35th head football coach in Stanford history on December 10, 2022. Taylor graduated at archrival Cal and served as an assistant coach there from 1996 to 1999 and as a radio color analyst from 2005 to 2011. Prior to Sacramento State, he was offensive coordinator at Utah and Eastern Washington. Taylor's tenure began with a win against Hawaii, but was followed up with four consecutive losses against USC, Taylor's previous school Sacramento State, Arizona, and Oregon. After staging a 29-point comeback against Deion Sanders' led Colorado, the fourth biggest comeback in Pac-12 history, the Cardinal proceeded to lose all but one of its remaining games, beating Washington State and losing to UCLA, Washington, Oregon State, Cal, and Notre Dame. Stanford finished 129th out of 130 teams in points allowed (37.2), yards allowed (461.7), and passing yards allowed (298), and finished 110th in points (20.6) and 92nd in yards (351.4). They were the only team in FBS without a home win and lost five games by 33 points or more. Taylor was fired on March 25, 2025, following back to back 3–9 seasons, and an investigation into alleged bullying of members of the Stanford athletic department.

==== Frank Reich season (2025) ====
On March 31, 2025, Stanford hired former Indianapolis Colts and Carolina Panthers head coach Frank Reich as their interim head coach for the 2025 season.

=== Tavita Pritchard era (2026–present) ===
On November 28, 2025, Stanford hired former Cardinal QB and current Washington Commanders quarterbacks coach Tavita Pritchard as permanent head coach. Prior to Washington, Pritchard coached at Stanford and was teammate of general manager Andrew Luck in 2008 and 2009. In July 2026, the team became the first campus chapter of the College Football Players Association, an organization advocating for the unionization of college athletes.

== Conference affiliations ==
- Independent (1891–1905)
- Pac-12 Conference (1919–2024)
  - Pacific Coast Conference (1919–1958)
  - Athletic Association of Western Universities (1959–1967)
  - Pacific-8 Conference (1968–1977)
  - Pacific-10 Conference (1978–2010)
  - Pac-12 Conference (2011–2023)
- Atlantic Coast Conference (2024–present)

== Championships ==
=== National championships ===
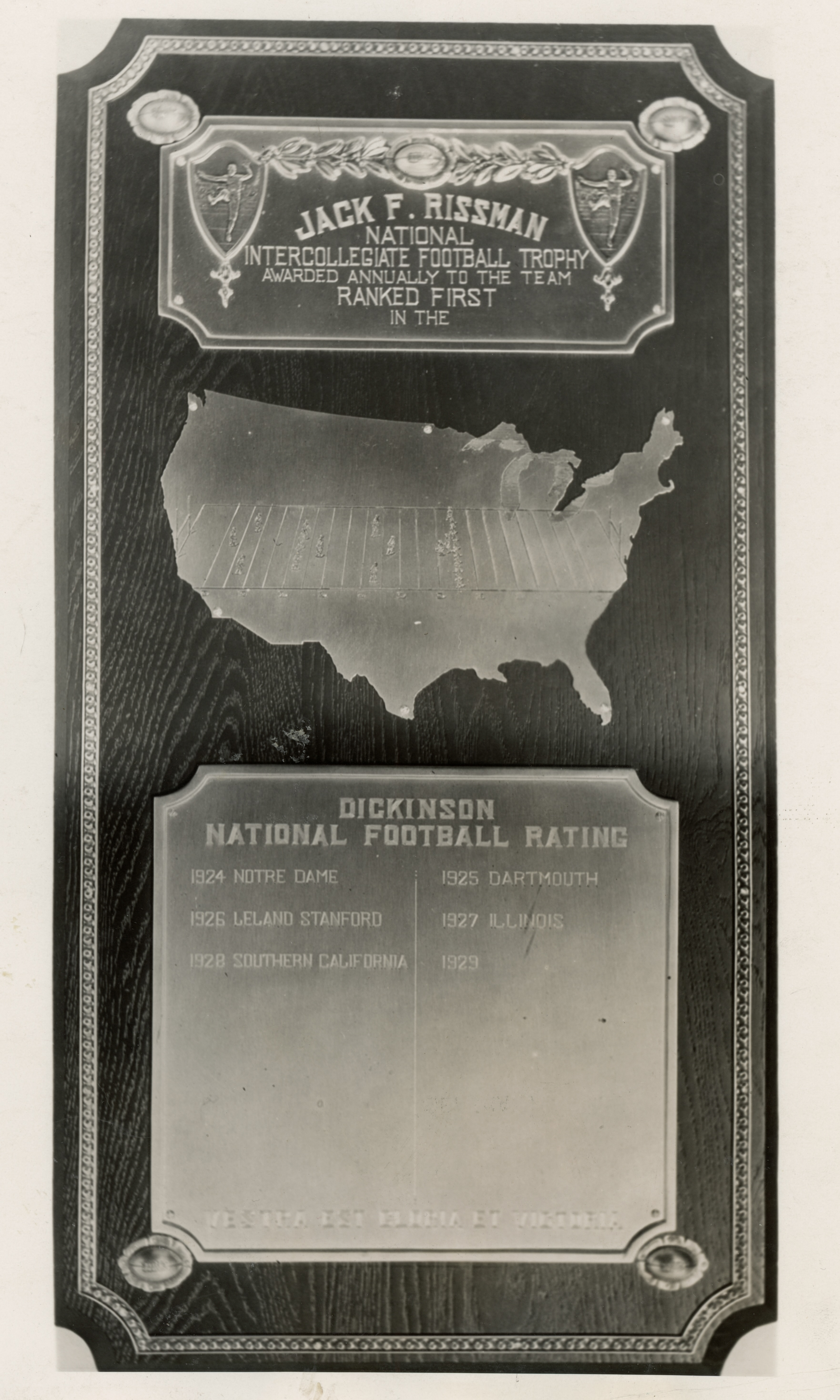
Jack F. Rissman Trophy awarded to Stanford for 1926 as Dickinson System national champions.

Stanford has won two (1926, 1940) national championships from NCAA-designated major selectors. Stanford claims both of these national championships.

Year	Coach	Selector	Record	Bowl	Result	Final AP	Final Coaches
1926	Pop Warner	Dickinson System, Helms Athletic Foundation, National Championship Foundation, Sagarin (ELOChess)	10–0–1	Rose Bowl	T 7–7	–	–
1940	Clark Shaughnessy	Billingsley Report, Helms, Poling System, Williamson System	10–0	Rose Bowl	W 21–13	No. 2	–

=== Conference championships ===
Stanford has won 16 conference championships, with six shared. They are tied with rival California for the fourth most in the Pac-12 Conference, behind UCLA, USC, and Washington.

Season	Conference	Coach	Conference Record	Overall Record
1924†	Pacific Coast Conference	Pop Warner	3–0–1	7–1–1
1926	Pacific Coast Conference	Pop Warner	4–0	10–0–1
1927†	Pacific Coast Conference	Pop Warner	4–0–1	8–2–1
1929†	Pacific Coast Conference	Pop Warner	5–1	9–2
1933†	Pacific Coast Conference	Claude E. Thornhill	4–1	8–2–1
1934	Pacific Coast Conference	Claude E. Thornhill	5–0	9–1–1
1935†	Pacific Coast Conference	Claude E. Thornhill	4–1	8–1
1940	Pacific Coast Conference	Clark Shaughnessy	7–0	10–0
1951	Pacific Coast Conference	Chuck Taylor	6–1	9–2
1970	Pacific-8 Conference	John Ralston	6–1	9–3
1971	Pacific-8 Conference	John Ralston	6–1	9–3
1992†	Pacific-10 Conference	Bill Walsh	6–2	10–3
1999	Pacific-10 Conference	Tyrone Willingham	7–1	8–4
2012	Pac-12 Conference	David Shaw	8–1	12–2
2013	Pac-12 Conference	David Shaw	7–2	11–3
2015	Pac-12 Conference	David Shaw	8–1	12–2

† Co-championship

=== Division championships ===
Season	Division	Coach	Opponent	CG result
2011†	Pac-12 – North	David Shaw	N/A lost tiebreaker to Oregon	
2012†	Pac-12 – North	David Shaw	UCLA	W 27–24
2013†	Pac-12 – North	David Shaw	Arizona State	W 38–14
2015	Pac-12 – North	David Shaw	USC	W 41–22
2017†	Pac-12 – North	David Shaw	USC	L 28–31

† Co-championship

== Bowl games ==
Stanford has participated in 30 bowl games. The Cardinal have a 15–14–1 bowl record.

Year	Coach	Bowl	Opponent	Result
1901	Charles Fickert	Rose Bowl	Michigan	L 0–49
1924	Pop Warner	Rose Bowl	Notre Dame	L 10–27
1926	Pop Warner	Rose Bowl	Alabama	T 7–7
1927	Pop Warner	Rose Bowl	Pittsburgh	W 7–6
1933	Claude E. Thornhill	Rose Bowl	Columbia	L 0–7
1934	Claude E. Thornhill	Rose Bowl	Alabama	L 13–29
1935	Claude E. Thornhill	Rose Bowl	SMU	W 7–0
1940	Clark Shaughnessy	Rose Bowl	Nebraska	W 21–13
1951	Chuck Taylor	Rose Bowl	Illinois	L 7–40
1970	John Ralston	Rose Bowl	Ohio State	W 27–17
1971	John Ralston	Rose Bowl	Michigan	W 13–12
1977	Bill Walsh	Sun Bowl	LSU	W 24–14
1978	Bill Walsh	Bluebonnet Bowl	Georgia	W 25–22
1986	Jack Elway	Gator Bowl	Clemson	L 21–27
1991	Dennis Green	Aloha Bowl	Georgia Tech	L 17–18
1992	Bill Walsh	Blockbuster Bowl	Penn State	W 24–3
1995	Tyrone Willingham	Liberty Bowl	East Carolina	L 13–19
1996	Tyrone Willingham	Sun Bowl	Michigan State	W 38–0
1999	Tyrone Willingham	Rose Bowl	Wisconsin	L 9–17
2001	Tyrone Willingham	Seattle Bowl	Georgia Tech	L 14–24
2009	Jim Harbaugh	Sun Bowl	Oklahoma	L 27–31
2010	Jim Harbaugh	Orange Bowl	Virginia Tech	W 40–12
2011	David Shaw	Fiesta Bowl	Oklahoma State	L 38–41 ^{OT}
2012	David Shaw	Rose Bowl	Wisconsin	W 20–14
2013	David Shaw	Rose Bowl	Michigan State	L 20–24
2014	David Shaw	Foster Farms Bowl	Maryland	W 45–21
2015	David Shaw	Rose Bowl	Iowa	W 45–16
2016	David Shaw	Sun Bowl	North Carolina	W 25–23
2017	David Shaw	Alamo Bowl	TCU	L 37–39
2018	David Shaw	Sun Bowl	Pittsburgh	W 14–13

== Head coaches ==
The following are Stanford's head coaches through the end of the 2025 season.

Coach	Tenure	Record	Pct.	Bowl record
No coach	1891	3–1–0	.750	
Walter Camp	1892, 1894–1895	11–3–3	.735	
C. D. Bliss	1893	8–0–1	.944	
Harry P. Cross	1896, 1898	7–4–2	.615	
George H. Brooke	1897	4–1–0	.800	
Burr Chamberlain	1899	2–5–2	.333	
Fielding H. Yost	1900	7–2–1	.750	
Charles Fickert	1901	3–2–2	.571	0–1
Carl L. Clemans	1902	6–1–0	.857	
James F. Lanagan	1903–1905	23–2–4	.862	
Bob Evans	1919	4–3–0	.571	
Walter D. Powell	1920	4–3–0	.571	
Eugene Van Gent	1921	4–2–2	.625	
Andrew Kerr	1922–1923	11–7–0	.611	
Pop Warner	1924–1932	71–17–8	.781	1–1–1
Claude E. Thornhill	1933–1939	35–25–7	.575	1–2
Clark Shaughnessy	1940–1941	16–3–0	.842	1–0
Marchmont Schwartz	1942, 1946–1950	28–28–4	.500	
Chuck Taylor	1951–1957	40–29–2	.577	0–1
Jack Curtice	1958–1962	14–36–0	.280	
John Ralston	1963–1971	55–36–3	.601	2–0
Jack Christiansen	1972–1976	30–22–3	.573	
Bill Walsh	1977–1978, 1992–1994	34–24–1	.585	3–0
Rod Dowhower	1979	5–5–1	.500	
Paul Wiggin	1980–1983	16–28–0	.364	
Jack Elway	1984–1988	25–29–2	.464	0–1
Dennis Green	1989–1991	16–18–0	.471	0–1
Tyrone Willingham	1995–2001	44–36–1	.549	1–3
Buddy Teevens	2002–2004	10–23	.303	
Walt Harris	2005–2006	6–17	.261	
Jim Harbaugh	2007–2010	29–21	.580	1–1
David Shaw	2011–2022	96–54	.640	5–3
Troy Taylor	2023–2024	6–18	.250	
Frank Reich	2025	4–8	.333	

== Individual honors ==
=== Award winners ===
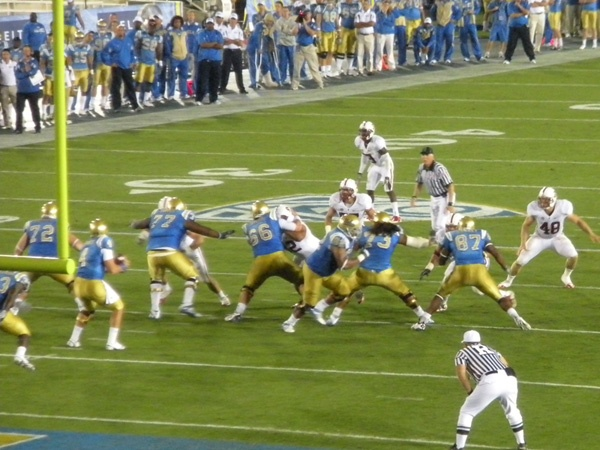
Stanford Cardinal playing the UCLA Bruins in the Rose Bowl Stadium

- Associated Press College Football Player of the Year

Christian McCaffrey – 2015

- Chic Harley Award

Jim Plunkett – 1970

- Doak Walker Award

Toby Gerhart – 2009
Bryce Love – 2017

- Fred Biletnikoff Award

Troy Walters – 1999

- Heisman Trophy

Jim Plunkett – 1970

- Jet Award

Ty Montgomery – 2013
Christian McCaffrey – 2015

- Johnny Unitas Golden Arm Award

Andrew Luck – 2011

- Jon Cornish Trophy

Elic Ayomanor – 2023

- Maxwell Award

Jim Plunkett – 1970
Andrew Luck – 2011

- Outland Trophy

Joshua Garnett – 2015

- Paul Hornung Award

Owen Marecic – 2010
Christian McCaffrey – 2015

- Sammy Baugh Trophy

Dick Norman – 1959
Guy Benjamin – 1977
Steve Dils – 1978
John Elway – 1982

- Walter Camp Award

Jim Plunkett – 1970
Andrew Luck – 2011

=== Retired numbers ===
Stanford has retired the following numbers.

Stanford Cardinal retired numbers
No.	Player	Pos.	Tenure
1	Ernie Nevers	FB	1923–1925
7	John Elway	QB	1979–1982
16	Jim Plunkett	QB	1968–1970

=== College Football Hall of Fame ===
The following Stanford players and coaches are members of the College Football Hall of Fame:

- Frankie Albert
- John Brodie
- Chris Burford
- Walter Camp (coach)
- Bill Corbus
- John Elway
- Hugh "Duke" Gallarneau
- Bobby Grayson
- Bob "Bones" Hamilton
- Andrew Kerr (coach)
- Andrew Luck
- Bill McColl
- James "Monk" Moscrip
- Darrin Nelson
- Ernie Nevers
- Jim Plunkett
- John Ralston (coach)
- Bob "Horse" Reynolds
- Clark Shaughnessy (coach)
- Jeff Siemon
- Chuck Taylor
- Pop Warner (coach)
- Paul Wiggin
- Fielding H. Yost (coach)
- Ken Margerum

=== Pro Football Hall of Famers ===
The following Stanford players are members of the Pro Football Hall of Fame:

- John Elway
- James Lofton
- John Lynch
- Ernie Nevers

=== Stanford Athletics Hall of Fame ===
The following Stanford players and coaches are members of the Stanford Athletics Hall of Fame

- Frankie Albert
- Frank Alustiza
- Bruno Banducci
- Benny Barnes
- Guy Benjamin
- John Brodie
- Jackie Brown
- George Buehler
- Don Bunce
- Chris Burford
- Ernie Caddel
- Gordy Ceresino
- Jack Chapple
- Bill Corbus
- Murray Cuddeback
- Ed Cummings
- Dud DeGroot
- Steve Dils
- Pat Donovan
- Mike Dotterer
- John Elway
- Chuck Evans
- Skip Face
- Hugh Gallarneau
- Bobby Garrett
- Bobby Grayson
- Bob "Bones" Hamilton
- Ray Handley
- Walt Heinecke
- Tony Hill
- Biff Hoffman
- Brian Holloway
- Dick Horn
- Dick Hyland
- Gary Kerkorian
- Gordon King
- Pete Kmetovic
- Jim Lawson
- Pete Lazetich
- Vic Lindskog
- James Lofton
- John Lynch
- Ken Margerum
- Norm Manoogian
- Ed McCaffrey
- Bill McColl
- Duncan McColl
- Hal McCreery
- Glyn Milburn
- Phil Moffatt
- Bob Moore
- Sam Morley
- Monk Moscrip
- Wes Muller
- Brad Muster
- Darrin Nelson
- Ernie Nevers
- Blaine Nye
- Don Parish
- John Paye
- Jim Plunkett
- Seraphim Post
- John Ralston
- Bob Reynolds
- Don Robesky
- Ken Rose
- Harlow Rothert
- John Sande III
- Clark Shaughnessy
- Harry Shipkey
- Ted Shipkey
- Jeff Siemon
- Bob Sims
- Malcolm Snider
- Norm Standlee
- Roger Stillwell
- Chuck Taylor
- Dink Templeton
- Keith Topping
- Tommy Vardell
- Randy Vataha
- Garin Veris
- Bill Walsh
- Pop Warner
- Gene Washington
- Bob Whitfield
- Paul Wiggin
- Dave Wyman

== Rivalries ==
=== California ===
Stanford's main rival is California (Cal). The rivalry between the two schools is one of the oldest in college football. The two teams play in the Big Game with the winner receiving the Stanford Axe. The most famous moment of the rivalry occurred in the 1982 Big Game, when Cal used a series of laterals to defeat Stanford 25–20 as time expired. Stanford leads the series 65–51–11.

=== Notre Dame ===
Notre Dame and Stanford have been rivals since 1925. The two teams have met every year since 1988, with the exception of 1995, 1996, and 2020. Notre Dame leads the series 24–14.

=== San Jose State ===
Stanford and San Jose State have been rivals since 1900. These two institutions are separated by approximately 23 miles in the Silicon Valley. The rivalry was named after Bill Walsh, who was a SJSU alumnus and positively contributed to Stanford Cardinal football through head coaching, notably the win against No. 21 Penn State in the 1993 Blockbuster Bowl, which later became the Cheez-It Bowl. Stanford leads the series 52–15–1, where the vast majority of matches have been played at Stanford.

=== Oregon ===
The Stanford–Oregon football rivalry dates to 1900 and rose to national significance during the 2010 to 2014 seasons, when the two teams alternated in spoiling one another's Pac-12 and College Football Playoff ambitions. Stanford leads the series 50–36–1.

The matchup is now dormant: after the Pac-12's collapse, Oregon moved to the Big Ten and Stanford joined the ACC beginning with the 2024 season, and no future meetings are scheduled.

=== UCLA ===
The West Coast in-state rivals have spent much of their respective athletics histories as members of the same conference; first the Pacific Coast Conference from 1925 to 1958 followed by the various predecessors of the modern day Pac-12 Conference from 1959 to 2023. The teams met annually from 1946 to 2023 without interruption. The rivalry has seen its fair share of excitement throughout its history, but reached its peak in the 21st century when both teams were consistently ranked in the top 25 and had numerous competitive games against each other. With the collapse of the Pac-12 following the 2023 season, which resulted in Stanford leaving to join the Atlantic Coast Conference (ACC) and UCLA accepting an invitation to join the Big Ten Conference, the annual series between the Cardinal and Bruins was put on hiatus. As of August 2025, there are no plans for the schools to meet again on the football field.

=== USC ===
Stanford maintains an active rivalry with USC. In 2007, an unranked Stanford team upset a No. 1 ranked USC team 24–23. Stanford was a 41-point underdog prior to the game, and many observers have called it the greatest upset in college football history. In 2009, Stanford defeated USC 55–21, resulting in a post-game verbal confrontation between Harbaugh and USC head coach Pete Carroll. In 2013, USC returned the favor by defeating No. 5 Stanford 20–17. In 2015, un-ranked Stanford went into L.A. and left with a 41–31 win over No. 6 USC, with Stanford QB Kevin Hogan playing the majority of the second half with a sprained ankle. USC leads the series 65–34–3.

== Future opponents ==
=== Conference opponents ===
On October 30, 2023, the Atlantic Coast Conference (ACC) announced the future schedules for SMU for the 2024 season to 2030. The 17-team ACC will play an eight-game conference schedule with just one division, with four non-conference contests. All 17 teams will play each other at least twice in 7 years, once at home and once on the road. The new scheduling model gives Stanford two protected games to play each year with California (rivalry) and SMU and rotate the remaining 14 teams each year.

=== Non-conference opponents ===
Announced schedules as of May 20, 2026.

2026	2027	2028	2029	2030	2031	2032	2033	2034	2035	2036
Hawaii	Vanderbilt	at Fresno State	Fresno State	Hawaii	Arizona State	Vanderbilt	at Vanderbilt	San Jose State	at San Jose State	San Jose State
Elon	Notre Dame	Portland State		William & Mary	at San Jose State	at Arizona State				
at Notre Dame		at Notre Dame								
		San Jose State								

== See also ==
- American football in the United States

== Sources ==
- Danzig, Allison (1956). The History of American Football: Its Great Teams, Players, and Coaches. Englewood Cliffs, NJ: Prentice-Hall.
- Miller, Jeffrey J. (August 3, 2015). Pop Warner. McFarland. ISBN 978-1-4766-2274-3.
- Nelson, David M. (1994). The Anatomy of a Game. University of Delaware Press. ISBN 978-0-87413-455-1.
- Pope, Edwin (1956). Football's Greatest Coaches. Tupper and Love.
- Powers, Francis J. (1969). Life Story of Glen S. (Pop) Warner, Gridiron's Greatest Strategist. Chicago, IL: The Athletic Institute.
