= Howard Christie =

American producer (1912–1992)

Howard Christie (September 16, 1912 – March 25, 1992) was an American producer of films and television.

== Early life and education ==
Christie was born in Orinda, California and graduated from Oakland Technical High School in 1929. He attended UC Berkeley, where he was a center on the Cal Bears football team and an All-American. He had planned to study medicine, but became interested in Hollywood after playing a small part in a 1935 anti-Communist comedy movie called Fighting Youth.

== Career ==
After his initial exposure to Hollywood and the film-making industry, Christie developed a preference for the production side of the business. He began as an assistant production manager at Universal, then transitioned to assistant director, and director. Ultimately, he became a producer, a role which he filled until his retirement in 1970. After serving as associate producer on the 1945 Deanna Durbin film Lady on a Train, he mostly produced Westerns and comedies. He produced more than 40 films including Against All Flags, Away All Boats, several Ma and Pa Kettle movies, and several Abbott and Costello movies including Abbott and Costello Meet the Invisible Man (1951), Abbott and Costello Go to Mars (1953), Abbott and Costello Meet the Mummy (1955), and Abbott and Costello Meet the Keystone Kops (1955).

In the late 1950s, as Universal reduced its production of western and comedy films, Christie moved into television. He became a vice president in Universal Studios’ television division. He was responsible for the production of several popular Western-themed TV series, notably Wagon Train for the entirety of its 8-year, 280-episode life (1957–1965). He was involved in the production of several other TV westerns, including 30 episodes of Laredo (1965–1967) and five episodes of The Virginian.

He retired in 1970 at age 58, and died in 1992 in Oak View, California.
