= Jim Moscrip =

American football player (1913–1980)

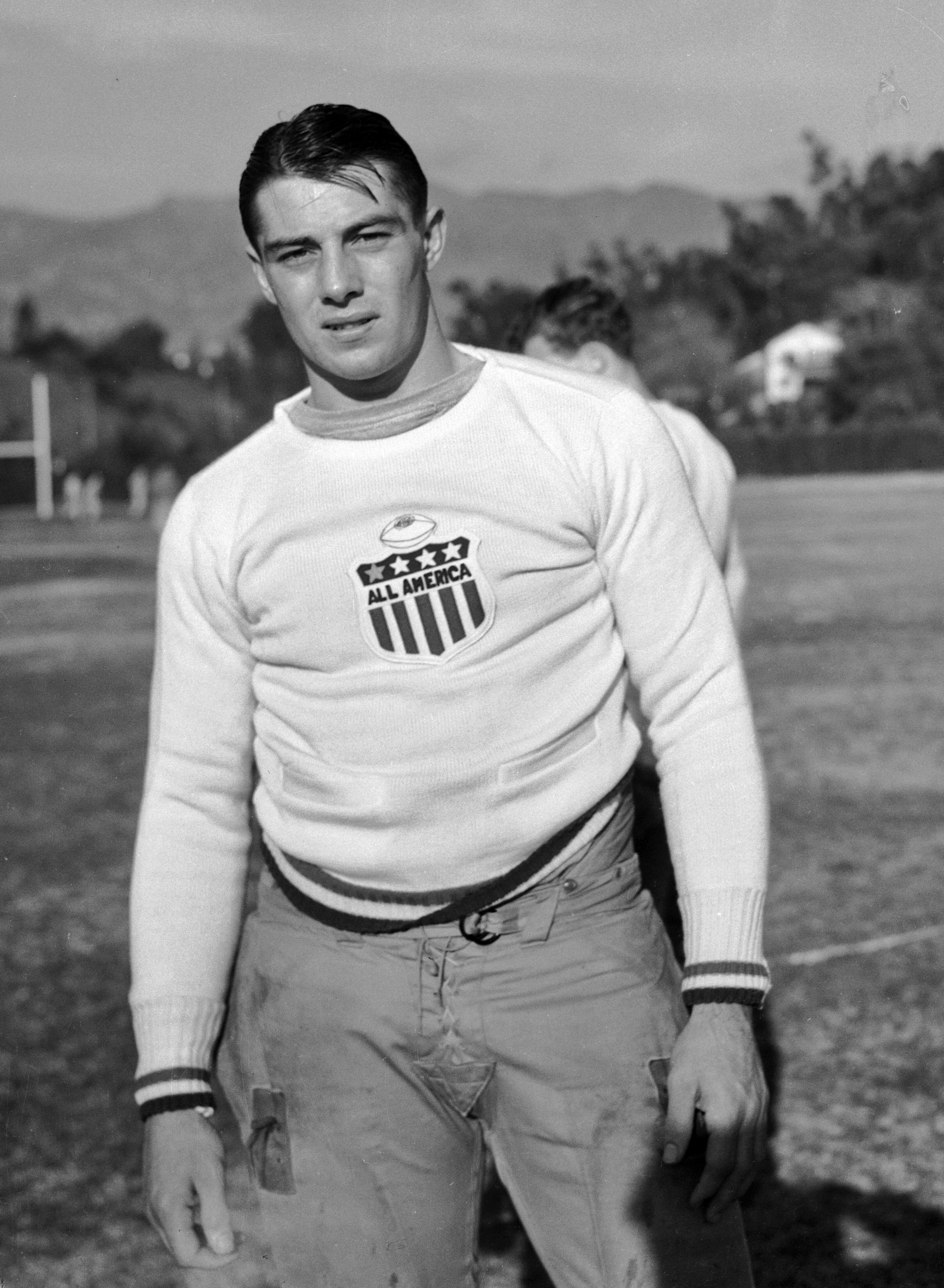
- Moscrip as a Stanford player in 1934

No. 23, 11
- Position: End

Personal information
- Born: September 17, 1913; Adena, Ohio, U.S.
- Died: October 11, 1980 (aged 67); Atherton, California, U.S.
- Listed height: 6 ft 0 in (1.83 m)
- Listed weight: 195 lb (88 kg)

Career information
- High school: Adena; Kiski School (Saltsburg, Pennsylvania)
- College: Stanford (1933–1935)
- NFL draft: 1936: 9th round, 76th overall pick

Career history
- Detroit Lions (1938–1939)

Awards and highlights
- Rose Bowl co-MVP (1936); Consensus All-American (1935); First-team All-American (1934); Third-team All-American (1933); 3× First-team All-PCC (1933, 1934, 1935)

Career NFL statistics
- Receptions: 20
- Receiving yards: 294
- Receiving touchdowns: 1
- Stats at Pro Football Reference
- College Football Hall of Fame

James Henderson "Monk" Moscrip (September 17, 1913 – October 11, 1980) was an American professional football player who was an end for the Detroit Lions of the National Football League (NFL). He played college football at Stanford University, then played two seasons professionally with the Lions. He is an inductee of the College Football Hall of Fame.

== Biography ==
Born in Adena, Ohio, Moscrip attended The Kiski Prep School in Saltsburg, Pennsylvania, before enrolling at Stanford University. Moscrip played as an end for the Stanford Indians football team (as it was then known) for the 1933 to 1935 seasons. Those teams were known as the "Vow Boys", as they vowed not to lose to USC. The Vow Boys teams did not lose a game to either USC or Cal, and went to three consecutive Rose Bowl Games, the January 1934 to January 1936 editions. Moscrip was named to the 1934 College Football All-America Team by multiple selectors, (Note: Despite receiving first-team honors from five of the nine official selectors, the NCAA does not recognize Moscrip as a consensus All-American for the 1934 season.) and was a consensus selection to the 1935 College Football All-America Team.

A 1933 newspaper article stated that Moscrip acquired his nickname while at Kiski: he once came to school with haircut that made him look "apish" (as in, like a monkey), and he was quickly called "Monk".

Moscrip was selected in the ninth round of the 1936 NFL draft. He played professional football with the Detroit Lions in 1938 and 1939—appearing in 11 games each season, he made 15 of 18 extra point attempts as a kicker and had one receiving touchdown.

Moscrip appeared in one movie, the 1936 film The Big Game, along with several other players of the era. He served as a lieutenant in the United States Navy during World War II and participated in battles at Guadalcanal, Iwo Jima, and Okinawa. After winning a fight against alcohol addiction, Moscrip served as the manager of the alcohol rehabilitation center in Woodside, California, for nearly 25 years. In October 1980, Moscrip died of a heart attack at his home in Atherton, California, at the age of 67. He was survived by his wife and two daughters.

Moscrip was selected to the Stanford Athletics Hall of Fame in 1954, and the College Football Hall of Fame in 1985.
