= 2018 Stanford Cardinal football team =

American college football season

2018 Stanford Cardinal football

Sun Bowl champion

Sun Bowl, W 14–13 vs. Pittsburgh
- Conference: Pac-12 Conference
- North Division
- Record: 9–4 (6–3 Pac-12)
- Head coach: David Shaw (8th season)
- Offensive coordinator: Tavita Pritchard (1st season)
- Offensive scheme: Multiple
- Defensive coordinator: Lance Anderson (5th season)
- Base defense: 3–4
- Home stadium: Stanford Stadium

2018 Pac-12 Conference football standings
	Conf.			Overall
Team	W		L	W		L
North Division
No. 13 Washington xy$	7	–	2	10	–	4
No. 10 Washington State x	7	–	2	11	–	2
Stanford	6	–	3	9	–	4
Oregon	5	–	4	9	–	4
California	4	–	5	7	–	6
Oregon State	1	–	8	2	–	10
South Division
Utah xy	6	–	3	9	–	5
Arizona State	5	–	4	7	–	6
USC	4	–	5	5	–	7
Arizona	4	–	5	5	–	7
UCLA	3	–	6	3	–	9
Colorado	2	–	7	5	–	7
Championship: Washington 10, Utah 3
$ – Conference champion; x – Division champion/co-champions; y – Championship game participant; Rankings from AP Poll

The 2018 Stanford Cardinal football team represented Stanford University in the 2018 NCAA Division I FBS football season. The Cardinal were led by eighth-year head coach David Shaw. They played their home games at Stanford Stadium and were members of the North Division of the Pac-12 Conference.

Stanford, coming off a 9–5 season and an appearance in the Pac-12 Championship Game in 2017, began the year ranked 13th in the preseason AP Poll. They won their first four games of the year, including wins over No. 17 USC and No. 20 Oregon, and rose to 7th in the polls. The Cardinal then lost four of their next five games, compiling losses to Notre Dame, Utah, Washington State, and Washington. After closing out the regular season with three straight wins, Stanford was third in the Pac-12 North with a conference record of 6–3. They were invited to the Sun Bowl, where they defeated ACC runner-up Pittsburgh to end the year at 9–4 overall.

Stanford's offense was led by junior quarterback K. J. Costello, who led the Pac-12 Conference in passer rating and finished in second in passing yards and touchdowns. Wide receiver J. J. Arcega-Whiteside finished with 1,059 receiving yards and a Pac-12-leading 14 receiving touchdowns. Offensive tackle Walker Little was named first-team all-conference. On defense, cornerback Paulson Adebo led the team with four interceptions and 17 passes defended, and was also named first-team all-conference.

As of 2026, this is Stanford's most recent bowl-eligible season and most recent season above .500.

== Recruiting ==
=== Recruits ===
The Cardinal signed a total of 14 recruits.

College recruiting (2018)
Name	Hometown	School	Height	Weight	Commit date
Jack West; QB	Saraland, Alabama	Saraland High School	6 ft 4 in (1.93 m)	217 lb (98 kg)	Jul 12, 2016
Jack West; QB	Recruit ratings: Scout: Rivals: 247Sports: ESPN:				
Justus Woods; RB	Charlotte, North Carolina	Charlotte Christian School	6 ft 0 in (1.83 m)	190 lb (86 kg)	Mar 16, 2017
Justus Woods; RB	Recruit ratings: Scout: Rivals: 247Sports: ESPN:				
Michael Wilson; WR	West Hills, California	Chaminade College Preparatory School	6 ft 2 in (1.88 m)	180 lb (82 kg)	Mar 29, 2017
Michael Wilson; WR	Recruit ratings: Scout: Rivals: 247Sports: ESPN:				
Tobe Umerah; DE	Macon, Georgia	Stratford Academy	6 ft 4 in (1.93 m)	237 lb (108 kg)	Apr 11, 2017
Tobe Umerah; DE	Recruit ratings: Scout: Rivals: 247Sports: ESPN:				
Ethan Bonner; CB	The Woodlands, Texas	The Woodlands High School	6 ft 1 in (1.85 m)	170 lb (77 kg)	Aug 3, 2017
Ethan Bonner; CB	Recruit ratings: Scout: Rivals: 247Sports: ESPN:				
Donjae Logan; CB	Mesa, Arizona	Desert Ridge High School	5 ft 11 in (1.80 m)	170 lb (77 kg)	Aug 4, 2017
Donjae Logan; CB	Recruit ratings: Scout: Rivals: 247Sports: ESPN:				
Jacob Mangum-Farrar; LB	Sugar Land, Texas	Kempner High School	6 ft 3 in (1.91 m)	210 lb (95 kg)	Aug 8, 2017
Jacob Mangum-Farrar; LB	Recruit ratings: Scout: Rivals: 247Sports: ESPN:				
Jay Symonds Jr. FB	Cambridge, Massachusetts	Buckingham Browne & Nichols School	6 ft 4 in (1.93 m)	257 lb (117 kg)	Oct 8, 2017
Jay Symonds Jr. FB	Recruit ratings: Scout: Rivals: 247Sports: ESPN:				
Kendall Williamson; CB	Snellville, Georgia	Brookwood High School	6 ft 1 in (1.85 m)	185 lb (84 kg)	Oct 16, 2017
Kendall Williamson; CB	Recruit ratings: Scout: Rivals: 247Sports: ESPN:				
Thomas Booker; DE	Baltimore, Maryland	Gilman School	6 ft 5 in (1.96 m)	290 lb (130 kg)	Oct 22, 2017
Thomas Booker; DE	Recruit ratings: Scout: Rivals: 247Sports: ESPN:				
Trey Stratford; C	Allen, Texas	Allen High School	6 ft 4 in (1.93 m)	270 lb (120 kg)	Dec 3, 2017
Trey Stratford; C	Recruit ratings: Scout: Rivals: 247Sports: ESPN:				
Andres Fox; DE	Mobile, Alabama	Mobile Christian School	6 ft 4 in (1.93 m)	245 lb (111 kg)	Dec 20, 2017
Andres Fox; DE	Recruit ratings: Scout: Rivals: 247Sports: ESPN:				
Caleb Kelly; LB	Atlanta, Georgia	Hapeville Charter Career Academy	6 ft 3 in (1.91 m)	218 lb (99 kg)	Feb 1, 2018
Caleb Kelly; LB	Recruit ratings: Scout: Rivals: 247Sports: ESPN:				
Tanner McKee; QB	Corona, California	Centennial High School	6 ft 6 in (1.98 m)	220 lb (100 kg)	Feb 7, 2018
Tanner McKee; QB	Recruit ratings: Scout: Rivals: 247Sports: ESPN:				
Overall recruit ranking:
Note: In many cases, Scout, Rivals, 247Sports, On3, and ESPN may conflict in their listings of height and weight.; In these cases, the average was taken. ESPN grades are on a 100-point scale.; Sources: "Stanford Football Commitments". Rivals.; "2018 Team Ranking". Rivals.com.

== Preseason ==
=== Award watch lists ===
Listed in the order that they were released

Award	Player	Position	Year
Lott Trophy	Bobby Okereke	LB	SR
Rimington Trophy	Jesse Burkett	C	SR
Chuck Bednarik Award	Alijah Holder	CB	SR
Chuck Bednarik Award	Bobby Okereke	LB	SR
Maxwell Award	K. J. Costello	QB	SO
Maxwell Award	Bryce Love	RB	SR
Doak Walker Award	Bryce Love	RB	JR
Fred Biletnikoff Award	J. J. Arcega-Whiteside	WR	SR
John Mackey Award	Kaden Smith	TE	SO
Butkus Award	Bobby Okereke	LB	SR
Outland Trophy	Jesse Burkett	C	SR
Outland Trophy	Nate Herbig	G	JR
Lou Groza Award	Jet Toner	K	JR
Ray Guy Award	Jake Bailey	P	SR
Wuerffel Trophy	Alameen Murphy	DB	SR
Walter Camp Award	Bryce Love	RB	SR
Earl Campbell Tyler Rose Award	Kaden Smith	TE	JR

=== Pac-12 media days ===
The 2018 Pac-12 media days are set for July 25, 2018 in Hollywood, California. David Shaw (HC), J. J. Arcega-Whiteside (WR) & Alijah Holder (CB) at Pac-12 media days. The Pac-12 media poll was released with the Cardinal predicted to finish in second place in the Pac-12 North division.

== Schedule ==
Date	Time	Opponent	Rank	Site	TV	Result	Attendance
August 31	6:00 p.m.	San Diego State*	No. 13	Stanford Stadium; Stanford, CA	FS1	W 31–10	40,913
September 8	5:30 p.m.	No. 17 USC	No. 10	Stanford Stadium; Stanford, CA (rivalry)	FOX	W 17–3	42,856
September 15	11:00 a.m.	No. 23 (FCS) UC Davis*	No. 9	Stanford Stadium; Stanford, CA	P12N	W 30–10	31,772
September 22	5:00 p.m.	at No. 20 Oregon	No. 7	Autzen Stadium; Eugene, OR (College GameDay; rivalry)	ABC	W 38–31 ^{OT}	58,453
September 29	4:30 p.m.	at No. 8 Notre Dame*	No. 7	Notre Dame Stadium; Notre Dame, IN (Legends Trophy)	NBC	L 17–38	77,622
October 6	7:30 p.m.	Utah	No. 14	Stanford Stadium; Stanford, CA	ESPN	L 21–40	37,244
October 18	6:00 p.m.	at Arizona State		Sun Devil Stadium; Tempe, AZ	ESPN	W 20–13	42,946
October 27	4:00 p.m.	No. 14 Washington State^{†}	No. 24	Stanford Stadium; Stanford, CA	P12N	L 38–41	39,596
November 3	6:00 p.m.	at Washington		Husky Stadium; Seattle, WA	P12N	L 23–27	69,690
November 10	6:00 p.m.	Oregon State		Stanford Stadium; Stanford, CA	P12N	W 48–17	34,671
November 24	12:00 p.m.	at UCLA		Rose Bowl; Pasadena, CA (rivalry)	P12N	W 49–42	38,391
December 1 (Note: Rescheduled from November 17 due to poor air quality caused by the Camp Fire.)	12:30 p.m.	at California		California Memorial Stadium; Berkeley, CA (121st Big Game/Stanford Axe)	P12N	W 23–13	57,858
December 31	11:00 a.m.	vs. Pittsburgh*		Sun Bowl; El Paso, TX (Sun Bowl)	CBS	W 14–13	40,680
*Non-conference game; ^{†}Homecoming; Rankings from AP Poll released prior to the game; All times are in Pacific time

== Personnel ==
=== Coaching staff ===
Name	Position	Stanford years	Alma mater
David Shaw	Head coach	12th	Stanford (1994)
Lance Anderson	Defensive coordinator / outside linebackers coach	12th	Idaho State (1996)
Tavita Pritchard	Offensive coordinator/quarterbacks	6th	Stanford (2009)
Pete Alamar	Special teams coordinator	5th	Cal Lutheran (1983)
Ron Gould	Running backs coach	2nd	Oregon (1987)
Morgan Turner	Tight ends coach	6th	Illinois (2009)
Kevin Carberry	Offensive line coach	1st	Ohio (2005)
Bobby Kennedy	Wide receivers coach	1st	Northern Colorado (1989)
Duane Akina	Defensive backs coach	5th	Washington (1979)
Peter Hansen	Inside linebackers coach	5th	Arizona (2001)
Diron Reynolds	Defensive linemen coach	2nd	Wake Forest (1994)

=== Roster ===
2018 Stanford Cardinal football
Quarterback: 3 K. J. Costello – junior (6'5, 215); 10 Jack West – freshman (6'4, 210); 15 Davis Mills – sophomore (6'4, 220); 17 Dylan Plautz – freshman (6'2, 200); 18 Jack Richardson – junior (6'5, 213); Running back: 20 Bryce Love – senior (5'10, 202); 22 Cameron Scarlett – senior (6'1, 216); 23 Trevor Speights – junior (5'11, 209); 25 Justus Woods – freshman (6'1, 211); 28 Dorian Maddox – junior (5'10, 202); 30 Cameron McFarlane – freshman (6'0, 200); Fullback: 6 Reagan Williams – senior (6'3, 220); 24 Jay Symonds – freshman (6'3, 247); 34 Houston Heimuli – sophomore (5'11, 244); 87 Ben Snyder – senior (6'4, 249); Wide receiver: 2 Trenton Irwin – senior (6'2, 204); 4 Michael Wilson – freshman (6'2, 200); 5 Connor Wedington – sophomore (6'0, 198); 8 Donald Stewart – junior (6'4, 200); 9 Osiris St. Brown – sophomore (6'2, 186); 11 Harry Schwartz – junior (6'0, 189); 13 Simi Fehoko – freshman (6'4, 210); 19 J. J. Arcega-Whiteside – senior (6'3, 225); 21 Isaiah Brandt-Sims – 5th Year Senior (5'11, 178); 81 Brycen Tremayne – freshman (6'4, 185); 83 Cameron Buzzell – sophomore (5'10, 170); 86 Sidhart Krishnamurthi – senior (5'11, 176); Tight end: 44 TaeVeon Le – freshman (6'4, 230); 80 Scooter Harrington – junior (6'5, 250); 82 Kaden Smith – junior (6'5, 252); 84 Colby Parkinson – sophomore (6'7, 240); 87 Kyle McCombs – sophomore (6'5, 233); 88 Tucker Fisk – sophomore (6'4, 260); Placekicker: 26 Jet Toner – junior (6'4, 201); 37 Collin Riccitelli – junior (6'0, 196)	Offensive lineman: 50 Trey Stratford – OG/OT – freshman (6'4, 258); 51 Drew Dalman – C – sophomore (6'3, 279); 54 Nick Wilson – OG – senior (6'3, 273); 55 Dylan Powell – OG/-C – junior (6'3, 281); 63 Nate Herbig – OG – junior (6'4, 334); 71 Brandon Fanaika – OG – 5th Year Senior (6'3, 315); 65 Brian Chaffin – C – senior (6'2, 275); 72 Walker Little – OT – sophomore (6'7, 313); 73 Jesse Burkett – C – 5th Year Senior (6'4, 300); 74 Devery Hamilton – OT – junior (6'7, 287); 75 A.T. Hall – OT – 5th Year Senior (6'5, 299); 76 Grant Pease – OT – freshman (6'4, 250); 78 Henry Hattis – OT – junior (6'6, 291); 79 Foster Sarell – OT – sophomore (6'7, 314); Long snapper: 49 Kyle Petrucci – freshman (6'6, 230); 53 Jack Chapman – freshman (6'2, 215); 69 Richard McNitzky – junior (6'1, 216); Punter: 14 Jake Bailey – senior (6'2, 202); 27 Charlie Beall – junior (6'2, 206); 14 Alex Gracey – freshman (6'3, 195); Defensive linemen: 6 Andres Fox – DE – freshman (6'4, 240); 23 Ryan Johnson – DE – sophomore (6'4, 262); 24 Dalyn Wade-Perry – DT – sophomore (6'4, 316); 34 Thomas Booker – DE – freshman (6'4, 279); 51 Jovan Swann – DE – junior (6'2, 271); 57 Michael Williams – DT – junior (6'2, 293); 58 Dylan Boles – DE – sophomore (6'4, 262); 91 Thomas Schaffer – DE – junior (6'7, 290); 93 Trey LaBounty – DE – freshman (6'7, 235); 97 Dylan Jackson – DE – senior (6'6, 264); 99 Bo Peek – DT – junior (6'3, 296)	Linebacker: 10 Jordan Fox – OLB – sophomore (6'3, 227); 14 Jacob Mangum-Farrar – ILB – freshman (6'4, 223); 15 Jordan Perez – ILB – 5th Year Senior (6'2, 228); 20 Bobby Okereke – ILB – 5th Year Senior (6'3, 234); 21 Curtis Robinson – OLB – junior (6'3, 232); 25 Andrew Pryts - ILB – junior (6'1, 222); 27 Sean Barton – ILB – senior (6'3, 224); 31 Mustafa Branch – ILB – senior (5'11, 212); 32 Joey Alfieri – OLB – 5th Year Senior (6'3, 239); 35 Tobe Umerah – OLB – freshman (6'4, 239); 40 Anthony Trinh – OLB – junior (6'2, 239); 42 Caleb Phillips – OLB – sophomore (6'5, 215); 44 Caleb Kelly – OLB – freshman (6'3, 213); 43 Ryan Beecher – ILB – senior (6'1, 245); 45 Ricky Miezan – ILB – freshman (6'2, 248); 47 Tangaloa Kaufusi – OLB – freshman (6'3, 245); 49 Lewis Burik – ILB – senior (5'10, 205); 52 Casey Toohill – OLB – senior (6'4, 248); 56 Jake Lynch – OLB – freshman (6'2, 220); 77 Thunder Keck – OLB – sophomore (6'3, 230); 90 Gabe Reid – OLB – sophomore (6'2, 231); Cornerback: 4 Alameen Murphy – 5th Year Senior (5'11, 198); 6 Treyjohn Butler – junior (5'11, 197); 11 Paulson Adebo – sophomore (6'1, 189); 13 Alijah Holder – 5th Year Senior (6'2, 188); 22 Obi Eboh – junior (6'2, 194); 26 J.J. Parson – junior (5'10, 175); 28 Donjae Logan – freshman (5'11, 178); 29 Kendall Williamson – freshman (6'1, 195); 30 Ethan Bonner – freshman (6'1, 181); Safety: 2 Brandon Simmons – SS – 5th Year Senior (6'0, 199); 3 Malik Antoine – FS – junior (5'11, 192); 5 Frank Buncom – FS – senior (6'2, 206); 9 Ben Edwards – SS – senior (6'0, 199); 18 Stuart Head – SS – sophomore (6'4, 201); 19 Noah Williams – FS – sophomore (6'0, 191)

== Game summaries ==
=== San Diego State ===
San Diego State Aztecs vs. Stanford Cardinal – Game summary

Quarter	1	2	3	4	Total
Aztecs	7	0	3	0	10
No. 13 Cardinal	0	9	15	7	31

at Stanford Stadium • Stanford, California

- Date: August 31, 2018
- Game time: 6:00 p.m.
- Game weather: Clear, 71 °F (22 °C)
- Game attendance: 40,913
- Referee: Brandon Cruse
- TV announcers (FS1): Justin Kutcher, DeMarco Murray, and Petros Papadakis
- No. 13 Stanford beats San Diego St. 31-10 in season opener,

Game information

First quarter

- SDSU – Juwan Washington 4-yard run (John Baron II kick), 2:38 (SDSU 7-0)

Second quarter

- STAN – Bobby Okereke safety, 7:27 (SDSU 7–2)
- STAN – J. J. Arcega-Whiteside 38-yard pass from K. J. Costello (Jet Toner kick), 0:27 (STAN 9-7)

Third quarter

- STAN – J. J. Arcega-Whiteside 19-yard pass from K. J. Costello (Jet Toner kick), 11:02 (STAN 16-7)
- SDSU – John Baron II 30-yard field goal, 6:49 (STAN 16-10)
- STAN – J. J. Arcega-Whiteside 80-yard pass from K. J. Costello (K. J. Costello–J. J. Arcega-Whiteside pass), 4:43 (STAN 24-10)

Fourth quarter

- STAN – Colby Parkinson 19-yard pass from K. J. Costello (Jet Toner kick), 10:54 (STAN 31-10)

Top passers

- SDSU – Christian Chapman – 10/15, 113 yards
- STAN – K. J. Costello – 21/31, 332 yards, 4 TD, int

Top rushers

- SDSU – Juwan Washington – 24 rushes, 158 yards, TD
- STAN – Bryce Love – 18 rushes, 29 yards

Top receivers

- SDSU – Tim Wilson Jr. – 2 receptions, 49 yards
- STAN – J. J. Arcega-Whiteside – 6 receptions, 226 yards, 3 TD

=== USC ===
USC Trojans vs. Stanford Cardinal – Game summary

Quarter	1	2	3	4	Total
No. 17 Trojans	0	0	3	0	3
No. 10 Cardinal	7	7	3	0	17

at Stanford Stadium • Stanford, California

- Date: September 8, 2018
- Game time: 5:30 p.m.
- Game attendance: 42,856
- TV: FOX

Game information

First quarter

- STAN – Bryce Love 6-yard run (Jet Toner kick), 10:26. Stanford 7-0. Drive: 8 plays, 83 yards, 4:34.

Second quarter

- STAN – Colby Parkinson 9-yard pass from K. J. Costello (Jet Toner kick), 0:34. Stanford 14-0. Drive: 5 plays, 51 yards, 0:44.

Third quarter

- USC – Chase McGrath 35-yard field goal, 11:24. Stanford 14-3. Drive: 9 plays, 58 yards, 3:36.
- STAN – Jet Toner 30-yard field goal, 6:04. Stanford 17-3. Drive: 9 plays, 79 yards, 5:20.

Fourth quarter

- No scoring plays.

Top passers

- USC – JT Daniels – 16/34, 215 yards, 2 int
- STAN – K. J. Costello – 16/27, 183 yards, TD

Top rushers

- USC – Aca'Cedric Ware – 18 rushes, 59 yards
- STAN – Bryce Love – 22 rushes, 136 yards, TD

Top receivers

- USC – Tyler Vaughns – 7 rec, 84 yards
- STAN – Kaden Smith – 4 rec, 77 yards

=== UC Davis ===
UC Davis Aggies vs. Stanford Cardinal – Game summary

Quarter	1	2	3	4	Total
No. 23 (FCS) Aggies	3	0	0	7	10
No. 10 Cardinal	0	17	10	3	30

at Stanford Stadium • Stanford, California

- Date: September 15, 2018
- Game time: 2:00 p.m.
- Game attendance: 31,722
- TV: Pac-12 Network

Game information

First quarter

- UCD – Max O'Rourke 26-yard field goal, 8:42 (UCD 3-0)

Second quarter

- STAN – J. J. Arcega-Whiteside 9 yard pass from K. J. Costello (Jet Toner kick), 13:26 (STAN 7-3)
- STAN – Jet Toner 31 yard field goal, 7:28 (STAN 10-3)
- STAN – J. J. Arcega-Whiteside 8-yard pass from K. J. Costello (Jet Toner kick), 2:16 (STAN 17-3)

Third quarter

- STAN – Jet Toner 33-yard field goal, 12:38 (STAN 20-3)
- STAN – Cameron Scarlett 5-yard run (Jet Toner kick), 2:38 (STAN 27-3)

Fourth quarter

- STAN – Jet Toner 46-yard field goal, 3:43 (STAN 30-3)
- UCD – C. J. Spencer 26-yard pass from Hunter Rodrigues (Max O'Rourke kick), 0:00 (STAN 30-10)

Top passers

- UCD – Jake Maier – 22/45, 194 yards, int
- STAN – K. J. Costello – 17/30, 214 yards, 2 TD, 2 int

Top rushers

- UCD – Namane Modise – 5 rushes, 41 yards
- STAN – Trevor Speights – 11 rushes, 87 yards

Top receivers

- UCD – Keelan Doss – 13 receptions, 106 yards
- STAN – Kaden Smith – 6 receptions, 68 yards

=== At Oregon ===
Stanford Cardinal vs. Oregon Ducks – Game summary

Quarter	1	2	3	4	OT	Total
No. 7 Cardinal	0	7	14	10	7	38
No. 20 Ducks	7	17	0	7	0	31

at Autzen Stadium • Eugene, Oregon

- Date: September 22, 2018
- Game time: 5:00 p.m.
- Game attendance: 58,453
- TV: ABC

Game information

First quarter

- ORE – Tony Brooks-James 7-yard run (Adam Stack kick), 8:30. ORE 7–0. Drive: 6 plays, 82 yards, 2:09.

Second quarter

- ORE – Jake Breeland 7-yard pass from Justin Herbert (Adam Stack kick), 13:26 ORE 14–0. Drive: 14 plays, 88 yards, 6:29.
- STAN – J. J. Arcega-Whiteside 13-yard pass from K. J. Costello (Jet Toner kick), 9:14. ORE 14–7. Drive: 7 plays, 64 yards, 4:12.
- ORE – C. J. Verdell 48-yard run (Adam Stack kick), 7:30. ORE 21–7. Drive: 4 plays, 75 yards, 1:44.
- ORE – Adam Stack 38-yard field goal, 1:55. ORE 24–7. Drive: 11 plays, 59 yards, 3:57.

Third quarter

- STAN – Joey Alfieri 80-yard Fumble Return (Jet Toner kick), 2:43. ORE 24–14. Drive: 9 plays, 29 yards, 4:31.
- STAN – Bryce Love 22-yard run (Jet Toner kick), 0:12. ORE 24–21. Drive: 3 plays, 65 yards, 1:11.

Fourth quarter

- ORE – Cyrus Habibi-Likio 1-yard run (Adam Stack kick), 4:39. ORE 31–21. Drive: 11 plays, 70 yards, 6:11.
- STAN – J. J. Arcega-Whiteside 15-yard pass from K. J. Costello (Jet Toner kick), 3:10. ORE 31–28. Drive: 3 plays, 79 yards, 1:29.
- STAN – Jet Toner 32-yard field goal, 0:00. Tied 31–31. Drive: 7 plays, 46 yards, 0:46.

Overtime

- STAN – Colby Parkinson 23-yard pass from K. J. Costello (Jet Toner kick). STAN 38–31. Drive: 2 plays, 25 yards.

Top passers

- STAN – K. J. Costello – 19/26, 327 yards, 3 TD
- ORE – Justin Herbert – 26/33, 346 yards, TD, int

Top rushers

- STAN – Bryce Love – 19 rushes, 89 yards, TD
- ORE – C. J. Verdell – 20 rushes, 115 yards, TD

Top receivers

- STAN – Kaden Smith – 6 rec, 95 yards
- ORE – Dillon Mitchell – 14 rec, 239 yards

Late in the 3rd quarter, Oregon led 24–7 and had a 1st & Goal at the Stanford 1-yard line. An ensuing fumble returned for a touchdown by the Stanford defense sparked an epic comeback where the Cardinal were able to win in overtime.

=== At Notre Dame ===
Stanford Cardinal vs. Notre Dame Fighting Irish – Game summary

Quarter	1	2	3	4	Total
No. 7 Cardinal	7	7	3	0	17
No. 8 Fighting Irish	14	7	3	14	38

at Notre Dame Stadium • Notre Dame, Indiana

- Date: September 29, 2018
- Game time: 7:30 p.m.
- Game attendance: 77,622
- TV: NBC

Game information

First quarter

- ND – Dexter Williams 45-yard run (Justin Yoon kick), 8:13. ND 7–0. Drive: 7 plays, 85 yards, 2:20.
- STAN – Bryce Love 39-yard run (Jet Toner kick), 4:39. Tied 7–7. Drive: 7 plays, 75 yards, 3:34.
- ND – Nic Weishar 6-yard pass from Ian Book (Justin Yoon kick), 0:09. ND 14–7. Drive: 11 plays, 77 yards, 4:30.

Second quarter

- STAN – J. J. Arcega-Whiteside 4-yard pass from K. J. Costello (Jet Toner kick), 10:36. Tied 14–14. Drive: 8 plays, 84 yards, 4:33.
- ND – Chase Claypool 10-yard pass from Ian Book (Justin Yoon kick), 0:39. ND 21–14. Drive: 7 plays, 80 yards, 1:24.

Third quarter

- ND – Justin Yoon 37-yard field goal, 8:07. ND 24–14. Drive: 11 plays, 56 yards, 4:05.
- STAN – Jet Toner 46-yard field goal, 2:16. ND 24–17. Drive: 8 plays, 53 yards, 3:51.

Fourth quarter

- ND – Miles Boykin 8-yard pass from Ian Book (Justin Yoon kick), 8:16. ND 31–17. Drive: 10 plays, 58 yards, 3:05.
- ND – Alizé Mack 35-yard pass from Ian Book (Justin Yoon kick), 8:02. ND 38–17. Drive: 1 play, 35 yards, 0:08.

Top passers

- STAN – K. J. Costello – 15/27, 174 yards, TD, int
- ND – Ian Book – 24/33, 278 yards, 4 TD

Top rushers

- STAN – Bryce Love – 17 rushes, 73 yards, TD
- ND – Dexter Williams – 21 rushes, 161 yards, TD

Top receivers

- STAN – Trenton Irwin – 5 rec, 57 yards
- ND – Miles Boykin – 11 rec, 144 yards, TD

=== Utah ===
Utah Utes vs. Stanford Cardinal – Game summary

Quarter	1	2	3	4	Total
Utes	7	17	3	13	40
No. 14 Cardinal	0	7	14	0	21

at Stanford Stadium • Stanford, California

- Date: October 6, 2018
- Game time: 7:30 p.m.
- Game attendance: 37,244
- TV: ESPN

Game information

First quarter

- UTAH – Zack Moss 7-yard run (Matt Gay kick), 0:47. UTAH 7–0. Drive: 13 plays, 80 yards, 6:28.

Second quarter

- UTAH – Jaylon Johnson 100-yard interception return (Matt Gay kick), 10:50. UTAH 14–0. Drive: 11 plays, 66 yards, 4:57.
- UTAH – Zack Moss 35-yard run (Matt Gay kick), 2:56. UTAH 21–0. Drive: 9 plays, 72 yards, 5:19.
- STAN – Trevor Speights 2-yard run (Jet Toner kick), 0:24. UTAH 21–7. Drive: 11 plays, 77 yards, 2:32.
- UTAH – Matt Gay 48-yard field goal, 0:00. UTAH 24–7. Drive: 4 plays, 45 yards, 0:24.

Third quarter

- UTAH – Matt Gay 49-yard field goal, 9:40. UTAH 27–7. Drive: 12 plays, 44 yards, 5:20.
- STAN – Cameron Scarlett 1-yard run (Jet Toner kick), 5:02. UTAH 27–14. Drive: 9 plays, 77 yards, 4:38.
- STAN – Michael Wilson 26-yard pass from K. J. Costello (Jet Toner kick), 1:44. UTAH 27–21. Drive: 5 plays, 74 yards, 2:02.

Fourth quarter

- UTAH – Matt Gay 34-yard field goal, 12:33. UTAH 30–21. Drive: 9 plays, 59 yards, 4:11.
- UTAH – Samson Nacua 57-yard pass from Tyler Huntley (Matt Gay kick), 7:12. UTAH 37–21. Drive: 5 plays, 74 yards, 2:39.
- UTAH – Matt Gay 37-yard field goal, 3:34. 'UTAH 40–21. Drive: 5 plays, 39 yards, 1:58.

Top passers

- UTAH – Tyler Huntley – 17/21, 199 yards, 1 TD
- STAN – K. J. Costello – 26/41, 381 yards, 1 TD, 2 int

Top rushers

- UTAH – Zack Moss – 20 rushes, 160 yards, 2 TD
- STAN – Trevor Speights – 17 rushes, 56 yards, 1 TD

Top receivers

- UTAH – Samson Nacua – 2 rec, 70 yards, 1 TD
- STAN – Kaden Smith – 8 rec, 120 yards

Starting running back Bryce Love sat the game out due to an ankle injury.

=== At Arizona State ===
Stanford Cardinal vs. Arizona State Sun Devils – Game summary

Quarter	1	2	3	4	Total
Cardinal	0	6	14	0	20
Sun Devils	3	0	3	7	13

at Sun Devil Stadium • Tempe, Arizona

- Date: October 18, 2018
- Game time: 6:00 p.m.
- Game attendance: 65,870
- TV: ESPN

Game information

First quarter

- ASU – Brandon Ruiz 34-yard field goal, 0:27. ASU 3–0. Drive: 8 plays, 66 yards, 1:57.

Second quarter

- STAN – Jet Toner 21-yard field goal, 3:40. Tied 3–3. Drive: 8 plays, 63 yards, 4:43.
- STAN – Jet Toner 31-yard field goal, 0:00. STAN 6–3. Drive: 12 plays, 76 yards, 2:01.

Third quarter

- ASU – Brandon Ruiz 24-yard field goal, 11:58. Tied 6–6. Drive: 8 plays, 59 yards, 3:02.
- STAN – J. J. Arcega-Whiteside 28-yard pass from K. J. Costello (Jet Toner kick), 7:55. STAN 13–6. Drive: 8 plays, 75 yards, 4:03.
- STAN – Cameron Scarlett 1-yard run (Jet Toner kick), 2:45. STAN 20–6. Drive: 7 plays, 80 yards, 3:45.

Fourth quarter

- ASU – Manny Wilkins 10-yard run (Brandon Ruiz kick), 7:50. STAN 20–13. Drive: 6 plays, 64 yards, 1:44.

Top passers

- STAN – K. J. Costello – 22/29, 231 yards, 1 TD
- ASU – Manny Wilkins – 26/43, 353 yards, 1 int

Top rushers

- STAN – Cameron Scarlett – 9 rushes, 54 yards, 1 TD
- ASU – Manny Wilkins – 11 rushes, 41 yards, 1 TD

Top receivers

- STAN – J. J. Arcega-Whiteside – 7 rec, 91 yards, 1 TD
- ASU – N'Keal Harry – 8 REC, 91 YDS

=== Washington State ===
Washington State Cougars vs. Stanford Cardinal – Game summary

Quarter	1	2	3	4	Total
No. 14 Cougars	14	3	7	17	41
No. 24 Cardinal	14	14	3	7	38

at Stanford Stadium • Stanford, California

- Date: October 27, 2018
- Game time: 4:00 p.m.
- Game attendance: 39,596
- TV: Pac-12 Network

Game information

First quarter

- STAN – J. J. Arcega-Whiteside 18-yard pass from K. J. Costello (Jet Toner kick), 11:09. STAN 7–0. Drive: 10 plays, 75 yards, 3:51.
- WSU – James Williams 5-yard run (Blake Mazza kick), 8:17. Tied 7–7. Drive: 6 plays, 75 yards, 2:52.
- WSU – Max Borghi 4-yard pass from Gardner Minshew (Blake Mazza kick), 5:23. WSU 14–7. Drive: 5 plays, 23 yards, 2:12.
- STAN – Cameron Scarlett 2-yard run (Jet Toner kick), 1:22. Tied 14–14. Drive: 8 plays, 75 yards, 4:01.

Second quarter

- STAN – Kaden Smith 10-yard pass from K. J. Costello (Jet Toner kick), 9:25. STAN 21–14. Drive: 4 plays, 66 yards, 2:00.
- STAN – Houston Heimuli 1-yard pass from K. J. Costello (Jet Toner kick), 1:04. STAN 28–14. Drive: 8 plays, 80 yards, 4:31.
- WSU – Blake Mazza 23-yard field goal, 0:00. STAN 28–17. Drive: 7 plays, 69 yards, 1:04.

Third quarter

- WSU – James Williams 3-yard run (Blake Mazza kick), STAN 28–24. Drive: 9 plays, 75 yards, 4:28.
- STAN – Jet Toner 40-yard field goal, 6:16. STAN 31–24. Drive: 8 plays, 53 yards, 4:16.

Fourth quarter

- WSU – Davontavean Martin 7-yard pass from Gardner Minshew (Blake Mazza kick), 12:26. Tied 31–31. Drive: 10 plays, 82 yards, 5:01.
- WSU – Renard Bell 3-yard pass from Gardner Minshew (Blake Mazza kick), 4:28. WSU 38–31. Drive: 11 plays, 67 yards, 4:47.
- STAN – J. J. Arcega-Whiteside 25-yard pass from K. J. Costello (Jet Toner kick), 1:25. Tied 38–38. Drive: 10 plays, 73 yards, 3:03.
- WSU – Blake Mazza 42-yard field goal, 0:19. WSU 41–38. Drive: 7 plays, 50 yards, 1:06.

Top passers

- WSU – Gardner Minshew – 40/50, 438 yards, 3 TD
- STAN – K. J. Costello – 34/43, 323 yards, 4 TD

Top rushers

- WSU – James Williams – 8 rushes, 30 yards, 2 TD
- STAN – Bryce Love – 6 rushes, 71 yards

Top receivers

- WSU – Dezmon Patmon – 10 rec, 127 yards
- STAN – Kaden Smith – 9 rec, 112 yards, TD

=== At Washington ===
Stanford Cardinal vs. Washington Huskies – Game summary

Quarter	1	2	3	4	Total
Cardinal	0	0	14	9	23
Huskies	14	7	3	3	27

at Husky Stadium • Seattle, Washington

- Date: November 3, 2018
- Game time: 6:00 p.m.
- Game weather: 54 °F (12 °C) and overcast
- Game attendance: 69,690
- Referee: Steven Strimling
- TV: Pac-12 Network

Game information

First quarter

- UW – Jake Browning 2-yard run (Peyton Henry kick), 8:09. UW 7–0. Drive: 8 plays, 73 yards, 4:44.
- UW – Drew Sample 11-yard pass from Jake Browning (Peyton Henry kick), 0:55. UW 14–0. Drive: 14 plays, 80 yards, 5:30.

Second quarter

- UW – Myles Gaskin 6-yard run (Peyton Henry kick), 12:20. UW 21–0. Drive: 6 plays, 26 yards, 2:31.

Third quarter

- STAN – Kaden Smith 14-yard pass from K. J. Costello (Collin Riccitelli kick), 9:43. UW 21–7. Drive: 8 plays, 61 yards, 4:27.
- UW – Peyton Henry 22-yard field goal, 4:27. UW 24–7. Drive: 10 plays, 70 yards, 5:16.
- STAN – Bryce Love 5-yard run (Collin Riccitelli kick), 1:55. UW 24–14. Drive: 6 plays, 67 yards, 2:28.

Fourth quarter

- STAN – Collin Riccitelli 21-yard field goal, 9:00. UW 24–17. Drive: 5 plays, 30 yards, 2:55.
- UW – Peyton Henry 38-yard field goal, 5:09. UW 27–17. Drive: 9 plays, 54 yards, 3:51.
- STAN – Trenton Irwin 33-yard pass from K. J. Costello (Collin Riccitelli PAT failed), 3:24. UW 27–23. Drive: 6 plays, 80 yards, 1:39.

Top passers

- STAN – K. J. Costello – 29/43, 347 yards, 2 TD, 3 int
- UW – Jake Browning – 16-27, 194 yards, TD

Top rushers

- STAN – Bryce Love – 18 rushes, 71 yards, TD
- UW – Myles Gaskin – 28 rushes, 148 yards, TD

Top receivers

- STAN – Kaden Smith – 8 rec, 107 yards, TD
- UW – Aaron Fuller – 5 rec, 62 yards

=== Oregon State ===
Oregon State Beavers vs. Stanford Cardinal – Game summary

Quarter	1	2	3	4	Total
Beavers	7	10	0	0	17
Cardinal	13	21	7	7	48

at Stanford Stadium • Stanford, California

- Date: November 10, 2018
- Game time: 6:00 p.m.
- Game attendance: 34,671

Game information

First quarter

- STAN – Bryce Love 28-yard run (Collin Riccitelli kick), 13:12. STAN 7–0. Drive: 5 plays, 75 yards, 1:48.
- OSU – Trevon Bradford 63-yard pass from Jake Luton (Jordan Choukair kick), 9:09. Tied 7–7. Drive: 1 play, 63 yards, 0:10.
- STAN – Colby Parkinson 28-yard pass from K. J. Costello (Collin Riccitelli PAT failed), 5:25. STAN 13–7. Drive: 8 plays, 75 yards, 3:44.

Second quarter

- STAN – Colby Parkinson 9-yard pass from K. J. Costello (Collin Riccitelli kick), 14:17. STAN 20–7. Drive: 9 plays, 65 yards, 4:47.
- STAN – Colby Parkinson 75-yard pass from K. J. Costello (Collin Riccitelli kick), 12:47. STAN 27–7. Drive: 1 play, 75 yards, 0:12.
- STAN – Colby Parkinson 5-yard pass from K. J. Costello (Collin Riccitelli kick), 7:51. STAN 34–7. Drive: 4 plays, 51 yards, 2:58.
- OSU – Noah Togiai 7-yard pass from Jake Luton (Jordan Choukair kick), 2:36. STAN 34–14. Drive: 13 plays, 75 yards, 5:15.
- OSU – Jordan Choukair 40-yard field goal, 0:00. STAN 34–17. Drive: 4 plays, 26 yards, 0:20.

Third quarter

- STAN – Cameron Scarlett 41-yard run (Collin Riccitelli kick), 9:32. STAN 41–17. Drive: 4 plays, 72 yards, 2:11.

Fourth quarter

- STAN – Dorian Maddox 1-yard run (Collin Riccitelli kick), 13:33. STAN 48–17. Drive: 15 plays, 80 yards, 8:44.

Top passers

- OSU – Jake Luton – 14/26, 205 yards, 2 TD, int
- STAN – K. J. Costello – 23/33, 342 yards, 4 TD, int

Top rushers

- OSU – Jermar Jefferson – 19 rushes, 109 yards
- STAN – Bryce Love – 11 rushes, 90 yards, TD

Top receivers

- OSU – Trevon Bradford – 5 rec, 120 yards, TD
- STAN – Colby Parkinson – 6 rec, 166 yards, 4 TD

Stanford beat Oregon State on a smoky night caused by the Camp Fire. The Air Quality Index was close to 150, which qualified as "Dangerous".

=== At UCLA ===
Stanford Cardinal vs. UCLA Bruins – Game summary

Quarter	1	2	3	4	Total
Cardinal	10	17	14	8	49
Bruins	6	14	16	6	42

at Rose Bowl • Pasadena, California

- Date: November 24, 2018
- Game time: 12:00 p.m.
- Game attendance: 38,391
- TV: Pac-12 Network

Game information

First quarter

- UCLA – J. J. Molson 38-yard field goal, 13:32. UCLA 3–0. Drive: 4 plays, 2 yards, 0:42.
- STAN – J. J. Arcega-Whiteside 19-yard pass from K. J. Costello (Jet Toner kick), 7:50. STAN 7–3. Drive: 5 plays, 62 yards, 2:12.
- STAN – Jet Toner 30-yard field goal, 3:20. STAN 10–3. Drive: 6 plays, 25 yards, 3:02.
- UCLA – J. J. Molson 35-yard field goal, 0:00. STAN 10–6. Drive: 8 plays, 57 yards, 3:20.

Second quarter

- STAN – Bryce Love 2-yard run (Jet Toner kick), 11:11. STAN 17–6. Drive: 7 plays, 75 yards, 3:49.
- UCLA – Joshua Kelley 12-yard run (J. J. Molson kick), 7:34. STAN 17–13. Drive: 9 plays, 75 yards, 3:37.
- STAN – Trenton Irwin 37-yard pass from K. J. Costello (Jet Toner kick), 2:27. STAN 24–13. Drive: 3 plays, 37 yards, 0:16.
- UCLA – Joshua Kelley 1-yard run (J. J. Molson kick), 0:37. STAN 24–20. Drive: 7 plays, 75 yards, 1:50.
- STAN – Jet Toner 20-yard field goal, 0:03. STAN 27–20. Drive: 3 plays, 24 yards, 0:22.

Third quarter

- UCLA – Martell Irby 12-yard run (JJ Molson kick), 12:19. Tied 27–27. Drive: 9 plays, 75 yards, 2:41.
- STAN – J. J. Arcega-Whiteside 23-yard pass from K. J. Costello (Jet Toner kick), 7:02. STAN 34–27. Drive: 10 plays, 75 yards, 5:17.
- STAN – J. J. Arcega-Whiteside 2-yard pass from K. J. Costello (Jet Toner kick), 5:24. STAN 41–27. Drive: 4 plays, 21 yards, 1:30.
- UCLA – Martin Andrus Jr. safety, 2:21. STAN 41–29. Drive: 1 play, -3 yards, 0:06.
- UCLA – Darnay Holmes 93-yard kickoff Return (JJ Molson kick), 2:09. STAN 41–36.

Fourth quarter

- UCLA – Wilton Speight 1-yard run (two-point conversion failed), 9:27. UCLA 42–41. Drive: 13 plays, 90 yards, 4:35.
- STAN – Osiris St. Brown 52-yard pass from K. J. Costello (Bryce Love run), 8:19. STAN 49–42. Drive: 3 plays, 75 yards, 1:08.

Top passers

- STAN – K. J. Costello – 23/37, 344 yards, 5 TD, int
- UCLA – Wilton Speight – 29/47, 466 yards, int

Top rushers

- STAN – Bryce Love – 22 rushes, 85 yards, TD
- UCLA – Joshua Kelley – 18 rushes, 55 yards, 2 TD

Top receivers

- STAN – J. J. Arcega-Whiteside – 7 rec, 106 yards, 3 TD
- UCLA – Caleb Wilson – 9 rec, 184 yards

=== At California ===
Stanford Cardinal vs. California Golden Bears – Game summary

Quarter	1	2	3	4	Total
Cardinal	10	3	0	10	23
Golden Bears	0	6	0	7	13

at California Memorial Stadium • Berkeley, California

- Date: December 1, 2018
- Game time: 12:00 p.m.
- Game weather: Clear • 52°F • Wind 12 WNW
- Game attendance: 57,857
- Referee: Steve Strimling
- TV: Pac-12 Network
- Stanford Football

Game information

First quarter

- STAN – Jet Toner 26-yard field goal, 9:15. STAN 3–0. Drive: 12 plays, 75 yards, 5:45.
- STAN – Cameron Scarlett 46-yard pass from K. J. Costello (Jet Toner kick), 4:37. STAN 10–0. Drive: 4 plays, 73 yards, 2:12.

Second quarter

- CAL – Greg Thomas 40-yard field goal, 10:14. STAN 10–3. Drive: 11 plays, 36 yards, 3:44.
- CAL – Greg Thomas 24-yard field goal, 4:58. STAN 10–6. Drive: 7 plays, 75 yards, 2:39.
- STAN – Jet Toner 19-yard field goal, 0:01. STAN 13–6. Drive: 9 plays, 53 yards, 1:21.

Third quarter

- No scoring plays.

Fourth quarter

- STAN – Jet Toner 21-yard field goal, 3:43. STAN 16–6. Drive: 13 plays, 77 yards, 7:07.
- STAN – Cameron Scarlett 3-yard run (Jet Toner kick), 2:27. STAN 23–6. Drive: 1 play, 3 yards, 0:05.
- CAL – Jordan Duncan 11-yard pass from Chase Garbers (Greg Thomas kick), 0:10. STAN 23–13. Drive: 13 plays, 75 yards, 2:17.

Top passers

- STAN – K. J. Costello – 18/29, 237 yards, TD
- CAL – Chase Garbers – 22/39, 197 yards, TD, 2 int

Top rushers

- STAN – Bryce Love – 22 rushes, 74 yards
- CAL – Patrick Laird – 19 rushes, 116 yards

Top receivers

- STAN – J. J. Arcega-Whiteside – 5 rec, 109 yards
- CAL – Jordan Duncan – 5 rec, 59 yards, TD

The 121st installment of the Big Game was delayed due to unhealthy air quality caused by the Camp Fire. It was only the second time in 27 years that both teams had 7 or more wins. The Cardinal quickly jumped out to a 10–0 start and never looked back. From there, the game was mostly a defensive struggle as cornerback Paulson Adebo intercepted two passes from Cal's Chase Garbers. As a result of this game, Stanford extended its winning streak to 9 games, the longest by either team in the series.

=== Vs. Pittsburgh (Sun Bowl) ===
Stanford Cardinal vs. Pittsburgh Panthers – Game summary

Quarter	1	2	3	4	Total
Cardinal	0	7	0	7	14
Panthers	0	10	3	0	13

at Sun Bowl • El Paso, Texas

- Date: December 31, 2018
- Game time: 12:00 p.m.
- Game attendance: 40,680
- TV: CBS

Game information

First quarter

- No scoring plays.

Second quarter

- PITT – Alex Kessman 29-yard field goal, 14:14. PITT 3–0. Drive: 6 plays, 54 yards, 3:04.
- STAN – Cameron Scarlett 1-yard run (Jet Toner kick), 7:39. STAN 7–3. Drive: 7 plays, 64 yards, 4:00.
- PITT – Darrin Hall 6-yard run (Alex Kessman kick), 2:32. PITT 10–7. Drive: 9 plays, 75 yards, 5:07.

Third quarter

- PITT – Alex Kessman 28-yard field goal, 8:13. PITT 13–7. Drive: 6 plays, 46 yards, 3:04.

Fourth quarter

- STAN – Cameron Scarlett 0-yard fumble recovery (Jet Toner kick), 11:28. STAN 14–13. Drive: 8 plays, 78 yards, 3:53.

Top passers

- STAN – K. J. Costello – 6/17, 105 yards
- PITT – Kenny Pickett – 11/29, 136 yards

Top rushers

- STAN – Cameron Scarlett – 22 rushes, 94 yards, 2 TD
- PITT – Darrin Hall – 16 rushes, 123 yards, TD

Top receivers

- STAN – J. J. Arcega-Whiteside – 3 rec, 90 yards
- PITT – Taysir Mack – 4 rec, 68 yards

== Rankings ==
Ranking movements Legend: ██ Increase in ranking ██ Decrease in ranking — = Not ranked RV = Received votes
	Week															
Poll	Pre	1	2	3	4	5	6	7	8	9	10	11	12	13	14	Final
AP	13	10	9	7	7	14	RV	RV	24	RV	—	RV	RV	RV	RV	RV
Coaches	13	9	9	7	7	14	24	24	23	RV	—	—	RV	RV	RV	RV
CFP	Not released									—	—	—	—	—	—	Not released

== Players drafted into the NFL ==
Round	Pick	Player	Position	NFL club
2	57	J. J. Arcega-Whiteside	WR	Philadelphia Eagles
3	89	Bobby Okereke	LB	Indianapolis Colts
4	112	Bryce Love	RB	Washington Redskins
5	163	Jake Bailey	P	New England Patriots
6	176	Kaden Smith	TE	San Francisco 49ers
