= 2018 Pittsburgh Panthers football team =

American college football season

2018 Pittsburgh Panthers football

ACC Coastal Division champion

ACC Championship Game, L 10–42 vs. Clemson

Sun Bowl, L 13–14 vs. Stanford
- Conference: Atlantic Coast Conference
- Coastal Division
- Record: 7–7 (6–2 ACC)
- Head coach: Pat Narduzzi (4th season)
- Offensive coordinator: Shawn Watson (2nd season)
- Offensive scheme: Pro-style
- Defensive coordinator: Randy Bates (1st season)
- Base defense: 4–3
- Home stadium: Heinz Field

2018 Atlantic Coast Conference football standings
	Conf.			Overall
Team	W		L	W		L
Atlantic Division
No. 1 Clemson x$#^	8	–	0	15	–	0
No. 15 Syracuse	6	–	2	10	–	3
NC State	5	–	3	9	–	4
Boston College	4	–	4	7	–	5
Wake Forest	3	–	5	7	–	6
Florida State	3	–	5	5	–	7
Louisville	0	–	8	2	–	10
Coastal Division
Pittsburgh x	6	–	2	7	–	7
Georgia Tech	5	–	3	7	–	6
Miami (FL)	4	–	4	7	–	6
Virginia	4	–	4	8	–	5
Virginia Tech	4	–	4	6	–	7
Duke	3	–	5	8	–	5
North Carolina	1	–	7	2	–	9
Championship: Clemson 42, Pittsburgh 10
# – College Football Playoff champion; ^ – College Football Playoff participant; $ – Conference champion; x – Division champion/co-champions; Rankings from AP Poll

The 2018 Pittsburgh Panthers football team represented the University of Pittsburgh in the 2018 NCAA Division I FBS football season. The Panthers were led by fourth-year head coach Pat Narduzzi and played their home games at Heinz Field. They were a member of the Coastal Division of the Atlantic Coast Conference (ACC). This was Pitt's sixth season as a member of the ACC.

== Preseason ==
=== Award watch lists ===
Listed in the order that they were released

Award	Player	Position	Year
Doak Walker Award	Darrin Hall	RB	SR
Butkus Award	Oluwaseun Idowu	LB	RS SR
Wuerffel Trophy	Darrin Hall	RB	SR

=== ACC media poll ===
The ACC media poll was released on July 24, 2018, with the Panthers predicted to finish in fifth place in the Coastal Division.

Media poll (Coastal)
Predicted finish	Team	Votes (1st place)
1	Miami	998 (122)
2	Virginia Tech	838 (16)
3	Georgia Tech	654 (8)
4	Duke	607 (1)
5	Pittsburgh	420
6	North Carolina	370 (1)
7	Virginia	257

== Schedule ==
The Panthers' schedule was released on January 17, 2018.

Date	Time	Opponent	Rank	Site	TV	Result	Attendance
September 1	3:30 p.m.	Albany*		Heinz Field; Pittsburgh, PA	ACCN Extra	W 33–7	34,486
September 8	8:00 p.m.	No. 12 Penn State*		Heinz Field; Pittsburgh, PA (rivalry)	ABC	L 6–51	68,400
September 15	12:30 p.m.	Georgia Tech		Heinz Field; Pittsburgh, PA	ACCRSN	W 24–19	34,284
September 22	12:20 p.m.	at North Carolina		Kenan Memorial Stadium; Chapel Hill, NC	Raycom	L 35–38	44,168
September 29	3:30 p.m.	at No. 11 UCF*		Spectrum Stadium; Orlando, FL	ESPNU	L 14–45	44,904
October 6	12:20 p.m.	Syracuse^{†}		Heinz Field; Pittsburgh, PA (rivalry)	Raycom	W 44–37 ^{OT}	37,100
October 13	2:30 p.m.	at No. 5 Notre Dame*		Notre Dame Stadium; Notre Dame, IN (rivalry)	NBC	L 14–19	77,622
October 27	3:30 p.m.	Duke		Heinz Field; Pittsburgh, PA	ACCRSN	W 54–45	31,510
November 2	7:30 p.m.	at No. 24 Virginia		Scott Stadium; Charlottesville, VA	ESPN2	W 23–13	36,256
November 10	3:30 p.m.	Virginia Tech		Heinz Field; Pittsburgh, PA	ESPNU	W 52–22	44,398
November 17	12:00 p.m.	at Wake Forest		BB&T Field; Winston-Salem, NC	ACCRSN	W 34–13	25,609
November 24	3:30 p.m.	at Miami (FL)	No. 23	Hard Rock Stadium; Miami Gardens, FL	ESPN	L 3–24	59,606
December 1	8:00 p.m.	vs. No. 2 Clemson		Bank of America Stadium; Charlotte, NC (ACC Championship)	ABC	L 10–42	67,784
December 31	2:00 p.m.	vs. Stanford*		Sun Bowl Stadium; El Paso, TX (Sun Bowl)	CBS	L 13–14	40,680
*Non-conference game; ^{†}Homecoming; Rankings from AP Poll and CFP Rankings after October 30 released prior to game; All times are in Eastern time

The Cathedral of Learning, which usually lights up after every Pitt sports win, was darkened following Pitt's 54–45 victory over Duke on October 27 out of respect for the Tree of Life Synagogue shooting in nearby Squirrel Hill, which had occurred earlier that day.

== Coaching staff ==
2018 Pittsburgh Panthers football staff
Coaching staff: Pat Narduzzi – head coach; Charlie Partridge – Assistant head coach/defensive line; Shawn Watson – Offensive coordinator/quarterbacks; Randy Bates – Defensive coordinator; Andre Powell – Running backs/special teams; Rob Harley – Linebackers/recruiting coordinator; Dave Borbely – Offensive line; Archie Bollins – Secondary; Tim Salem – Tight ends; Cory Sanders – Safeties; Kevin Sherman – Wide receivers	Support staff: Chris Lasala – Associate Athletic Director/football operations; Bob Junko – Director of player development and High School Relations; Ben Mathers – Director of football operations; Reed Case – Director of Recruiting; Ben Cotton – Offensive graduate assistant; Mike Caprara – Defensive graduate assistant; Mike Perish – Offensive graduate assistant; Josh Lott – Defensive graduate assistant	Strength and conditioning staff: Dave Andrews – Head Strength and Conditioning Coach; Freddie Walker – Associate Strength and Conditioning Coach; Austin Addington-strapp – Assistant strength and conditioning coach; Source:

== Roster ==
2018 Pittsburgh Panthers football roster
Quarterbacks: 3 Jeff George Jr. – (redshirt) junior (6'3, 220); 4 Nick Patti – freshman (6'1, 185); 8 Kenny Pickett – sophomore (6'2, 220); 12 Ricky Town – (redshirt) junior (6'3, 215); 14 Tyler Zelinski – (redshirt) sophomore (6'4, 210); 15 Justin Sliwoski – freshman (6'1, 190); 16 Jake Cortes – freshman (6'5, 240); Tailbacks: 7 Mychale Salahuddin – freshman (5'11, 190); 21 A.J. Davis – sophomore (6'0, 215); 22 Darrin Hall – senior (5'11, 225); 26 Todd Sibley Jr. – (redshirt) freshman (5'9, 215); 30 Qadree Ollison – (redshirt) senior (6'2, 225); 37 Cole Blake – (redshirt) senior (5'11, 210); 39 Kyle Vreen – (redshirt) sophomore (5'10, 190); Fullbacks: 34 Jason Edwards – freshman (5'10, 230); 35 George Aston – (redshirt) senior (6'0, 240); 47 Ryan Sliwoski – (redshirt) junior (5'11, 225); 48 Peyton Deri – (redshirt) sophomore (6'1, 225); Wide receivers: 2 Maurice Ffrench – junior (5'11, 190); 5 Tre Tipton – (redshirt) junior (6'0, 190); 6 Aaron Mathews – junior (6'4, 215); 9 Michael Smith – (redshirt) freshman (6'1, 215); 11 Taysir Mack – (redshirt) sophomore (6'2, 195); 17 Darian Street – (redshirt) freshman (6'1, 185); 18 Shocky Jacques−Louis – freshman (6'0, 180); 19 V'Lique Carter – freshman (5’9, 170); 40 Charles Chustckie – freshman (6'2, 190); 46 Michael Vardzel – (redshirt) sophomore (5'11, 190); 48 Kellen McAlone – (redshirt) senior (6'2, 210); 49 Alex Capstick – freshman (6'1, 205); 80 Cameron O'Neil – freshman (6'1, 185); 82 Rafael Araujo-Lopes – (redshirt) senior (5'9, 190); 83 John Vardzel – freshman (5'10, 175); 85 Garrett Bickhart – (redshirt) freshman (6'5, 210); 88 Dontavius Butler−Jenkins – (redshirt) freshman (6'0, 210); Tight ends: 10 Will Gragg – (redshirt) junior (6'4, 250); 19 Jake Zilinskas – (redshirt) sophomore (6'2, 230); 81 Jim Medure – (redshirt) junior (6'2, 235); 84 Grant Carrigan – (redshirt) freshman (6'7, 280); 86 Tyler Sear – sophomore (6'4, 250); 98 Kaymar Mimes – freshman (6'5, 235)	Offensive linemen: 52 Devon Davis – (redshirt) junior (6’4, 325); 53 Jake Kradel – freshman (6'3, 290); 55 Chase Brown – (redshirt) junior (6’5, 305); 56 Brandon Ford – (redshirt) sophomore (6’5, 305); 57 Gabe Houy – (redshirt) freshman (6'6, 310); 59 Carson Van Lynn – (redshirt) freshman (6’5, 290); 60 Owen Drexel – (redshirt) freshman (6'3, 290); 63 Nick Stazer – freshman (6’3, 295); 66 Mike Herndon – (redshirt) senior (6’4, 310); 67 Jimmy Morrissey – (redshirt) sophomore (6’3, 300); 68 Blake Zubovic – freshman (6’4, 300); 69 Kenny Rainey III – (redshirt) freshman (6'3, 320); 70 Stefano Millin – (redshirt) senior (6’5, 300); 71 Bryce Hargrove – (redshirt) sophomore (6’4, 310); 74 Jerry Drake Jr. – (redshirt) freshman (6’5, 305); 76 Connor Dintino – (redshirt) senior (6’3, 315); 77 Carter Warren – (redshirt) freshman (6'5, 320); 78 Alex Bookser – (redshirt) senior (6’6, 315); Defensive linemen: 2 David Green – freshman (6'0, 255); 5 Deslin Alexandre – (redshirt) freshman (6'4, 270); 6 John Morgan – freshman (6'2, 250); 8 Dewayne Hendrix – (redshirt) senior (6’4, 265); 10 Keyshon Camp – (redshirt) sophomore (6’4, 285); 17 Rashad Weaver – (redshirt) sophomore (6’5, 260); 34 Amir Watts – junior (6’3, 290); 36 Chase Pine – (redshirt) sophomore (6’2, 250); 40 James Folston Jr. – (redshirt) senior (6’4, 250); 45 Noah Palmer – freshman (6'3, 215); 50 Tyler Bentley – freshman (6'2, 300); 55 Jaylen Twyman – (redshirt) freshman (6'2, 300); 68 Brian Burgess – (redshirt) freshman (6’2, 290); 87 Habakkuk Baldonado – freshman (6’5, 230); 90 Rashad Wheeler – (redshirt) sophomore (6’3, 285); 91 Patrick Jones II – (redshirt) sophomore (6’5, 265); 93 Shane Roy – (redshirt) senior (6’4, 280); 95 Devin Danielson – freshman (6'1, 290); 96 Chris Maloney – freshman (6’2, 235); Punters: 97 Ethan Van Buskirk – freshman (5'10, 220); 98 Kirk Christodoulou – (redshirt) freshman (6'1, 210)	Linebackers: 9 Saleem Brightwell – (redshirt) junior (6’0, 225); 23 Oluwaseun Idowu – (redshirt) senior (6’0, 230); 25 Elijah Zeise – (redshirt) senior (6’2, 240); 28 Anthony McKee Jr. – (redshirt) junior (6’2, 220); 29 Albert Tucker – (redshirt) freshman (6'1, 225); 35 Chase Villani – freshman (6’1, 220); 37 Jackson Henry – freshman (6’2, 225); 38 Cam Bright – (redshirt) freshman (6'0, 220); 39 Wendell Davis – freshman (6’2, 235); 44 Elias Reynolds – (redshirt) sophomore (6’2, 235); 47 Kyle Nunn – (redshirt) freshman (6'3, 225); 52 Jack Hansberry – freshman (6’1, 210); 58 Quintin Wirginis – (redshirt) senior (6'2, 250); Defensive backs: 3 Damar Hamlin – junior (6’1, 195); 4 Therran Coleman – (redshirt) sophomore (6’0, 200); 7 Jazzee Stocker – (redshirt) junior (6’2, 190); 11 Dane Jackson – (redshirt) junior (6’0, 185); 12 Paris Ford – (redshirt) freshman (6'0, 195); 14 Marquis Williams – freshman (5’8, 160); 15 Jason Pinnock – sophomore (6'0, 195); 16 Damarri Mathis – sophomore (5'11, 190); 20 Dennis Briggs – (redshirt) senior (5’10, 195); 22 Kollin Smith – (redshirt) freshman (5'10, 180); 24 Phil Campbell III – (redshirt) sophomore (6’1, 200); 26 Judson Tallandier – freshman (6'0, 180); 27 Bricen Garner – (redshirt) sophomore (6’1, 190); 31 Erick Hallett – freshman (5'11, 175); 32 Phillipie Motley – (redshirt) senior (5’10, 180); 41 Colin Jonov – (redshirt) senior (5’9, 195); 46 Rimoni Dorsey – (redshirt) junior (6’0, 205); Placekickers: 49 Jake Scarton – (redshirt) freshman (6'3, 195); 97 Alex Kessman – (redshirt) sophomore (6'3, 195); 98 Will Connelly – freshman (6'2, 220); Long snappers: 51 Grey Brancifort – freshman (6'1, 225); 94 Cal Adomitis – sophomore (6'1, 225)

== Game summaries ==
=== Albany ===
Albany at Pittsburgh

Team	1	2	3	4	Total
Great Danes	7	0	0	0	7
• Panthers	19	14	0	0	33

- Date: September 1
- Location:
  Heinz Field
  Pittsburgh, PA
- Game start: 3:35 p.m. EDT
- Elapsed time: 2:56
- Game attendance: 34,486
- Game weather: 86°F • S 6 • Mostly Sunny, Humid
- Referee: Marcus Woods
- TV announcers (ACCN Extra):
  Play-by-Play: Joel Meyers
  Analyst: Dustin Fox

Scoring summary
1	14:48	PITT	Maurice Ffrench 91-yard kickoff return (Alex Kessman kick)	PITT 7–0
1	11:03	PITT	Kenny Pickett 5-yard run (Alex Kessman PAT missed)	PITT 13–0
1	4:42	PITT	Maurice Ffrench 5-yard run (2-pt conversion failed)	PITT 19–0
1	1:45	ALBY	Dev Holmes 9-yard pass from Vincent Testaverde (Ethan Stark kick)	PITT 19–7
2	10:17	PITT	Rafael Araujo-Lopes 3-yard pass from Kenny Pickett (Alex Kessman kick)	PITT 26–7
2	1:08	PITT	Rafael Araujo-Lopes 42-yard pass from Kenny Pickett (Alex Kessman kick)	PITT 33–7

=== Penn State ===
Penn State at Pittsburgh

Team	1	2	3	4	Total
• No. 13 Nittany Lions	7	7	16	21	51
Panthers	6	0	0	0	6

- Date: September 8
- Location:
  Heinz Field
  Pittsburgh, PA
- Game start: 8:15 p.m. EDT
- Elapsed time: 3:25
- Game attendance: 68,400
- Game weather: 58°F • ENE 10 • Rain
- Referee: John O'Neill
- TV announcers (ABC):
  Play-by-Play: Sean McDonough
  Analyst: Todd Blackledge
  Sideline: Holly Rowe

Scoring summary
1	12:14	PSU	K. J. Hamler 32-yard run (Jake Pinegar kick)	PSU 7–0
1	7:09	PITT	Qadree Ollison 13-yard run (Kirk Christodoulou rush failed)	PSU 7–6
2	0:26	PSU	K. J. Hamler 14-yard pass from Trace McSorley (Jake Pinegar kick)	PSU 14–6
3	8:36	PSU	Trace McSorley 4-yard run (Jake Pinegar kick)	PSU 21–6
3	7:38	PSU	safety	PSU 23–6
3	0:28	PSU	DeAndre Thompkins 39-yard punt return (Jake Pinegar kick)	PSU 30–6
4	11:40	PSU	Mac Hippenhammer 11-yard pass from Trace McSorley (Jake Pinegar kick)	PSU 37–6
4	6:17	PSU	Mark Allen 4-yard run (Jake Pinegar kick)	PSU 44–6
4	4:21	PSU	Brandon Polk 34-yard pass from Sean Clifford (Jake Pinegar kick)	PSU 51–6

=== Georgia Tech ===
Georgia Tech at Pittsburgh

Team	1	2	3	4	Total
Yellow Jackets	0	0	6	13	19
• Panthers	14	7	3	0	24

- Date: September 15
- Location:
  Heinz Field
  Pittsburgh, PA
- Game start: 12:34 p.m. EDT
- Elapsed time: 3:03
- Game attendance: 34,284
- Game weather: 79°F • E 8 • Mostly Cloudy
- Referee: Jerry Magallanes
- TV announcers (ACCRSN):
  Play-by-Play: Wes Durham
  Analyst: James Bates

Scoring summary
1	8:38	PITT	Qadree Ollison 31-yard run (Alex Kessman kick)	PITT 7–0
1	5:20	PITT	Darrin Hall 5-yard run (Alex Kessman Kick)	PITT 14–0
2	2:59	PITT	Qadree Ollison 8-yard run (Alex Kessman kick)	PITT 21–0
3	8:43	GT	TaQuon Marshall 1-yard run (Brenton King kick failed)	PITT 21–6
3	2:36	PITT	Alex Kessman 33-yard field goal	PITT 24–6
4	13:09	GT	TaQuon Marshall 7-yard run (TaQuon Marshall pass failed)	PITT 24–12
4	0:37	GT	Clinton Lynch 3-yard run (Brenton King kick )	PITT 24–19

=== At North Carolina ===
Pittsburgh at North Carolina

Team	1	2	3	4	Total
Panthers	7	21	0	7	35
• Tar Heels	7	14	17	0	38

- Date: September 22
- Location:
  Kenan Memorial Stadium
  Chapel Hill, NC
- Game start: 12:20 p.m. EDT
- Elapsed time: 3:17
- Game attendance: 44,168
- Game weather: 84°F • W 3 • Sunny
- Referee: Riley Johnson
- TV announcers (Raycom):
  Play-by-Play: Tom Werme
  Analyst: Dave Archer
  Sideline: Lericia Harris

Scoring summary
1	7:02	UNC	Antonio Williams 37-yard run (Freeman Jones kick)	UNC 0–7
1	2:31	PITT	Kenny Pickett 7-yard run (Alex Kessman Kick)	Tied 7–7
2	14:36	UNC	Antonio Williams 1-yard run (Freeman Jones kick)	UNC 7–14
2	7:56	PITT	Qadree Ollison 2-yard run (Alex Kessman kick)	Tied 14–14
2	5:56	UNC	Michael Carter 8-yard pass from Nathan Elliott (Freeman Jones kick)	UNC 14–21
2	3:07	PITT	Darrin Hall 65-yard run (Alex Kessman kick)	Tied 21–21
2	0:35	PITT	George Aston 1-yard pass from Kenny Pickett (Alex Kessman kick)	PITT 28–21
3	7:17	UNC	Jordon Brown 1-yard run (Freeman Jones kick)	Tied 28–28
3	4:12	UNC	Dyami Brown 19-yard pass from Nathan Elliott (Freeman Jones kick)	UNC 28–35
3	1:36	UNC	Freeman Jones 37-yard field goal	UNC 28–38
4	3:12	PITT	Maurice Ffrench 16-yard pass from Kenny Pickett (Alex Kessman kick )	UNC 35–38

=== At UCF ===
Pittsburgh at UCF

Team	1	2	3	4	Total
Panthers	7	0	0	7	14
• No. 13 Knights	14	17	7	7	45

- Date: September 29
- Location:
  Spectrum Stadium
  Orlando, FL
- Game start: 3:32 p.m. EDT
- Elapsed time: 3:20
- Game attendance: 44,904
- Game weather: 91°F • E 11 • Hot
- Referee: Jerry Magallanes
- TV announcers (ESPNU):
  Play-by-Play: Mike Corey
  Analyst: Rene Ingoglia

Scoring summary
1	6:52	UCF	McKenzie Milton 5-yard run (Matthew Wright kick)	UCF 0–7
1	4:07	UCF	Gabe Davis 24-yard pass from McKenzie Milton (Matthew Wright kick)	UCF 0–14
1	1:13	PITT	Rafael Araujo-Lopes 86-yard punt return (Alex Kessman kick)	UCF 7–14
2	14:50	UCF	McKenzie Milton 23-yard run (Matthew Wright kick)	UCF 7–21
2	5:33	UCF	Michael Colubiale 2-yard pass from McKenzie Milton (Matthew Wright kick)	UCF 7–28
2	0:07	UCF	Matthew Wright 21-yard field goal	UCF 7–31
3	12:39	UCF	Adrian Killins 71-yard pass from McKenzie Milton (Matthew Wright kick)	UCF 7–38
4	7:17	UCF	Otis Anderson 13-yard pass from McKenzie Milton (Matthew Wright kick)	UCF 7–45
4	4:46	PITT	Maurice Ffrench 58-yard pass from Kenny Pickett	UCF 14–45

=== Syracuse ===
Syracuse at Pittsburgh

Team	1	2	3	4	OT	Total
Orange	14	3	14	6	0	37
• Panthers	14	6	7	10	7	44

- Date: October 6
- Location:
  Heinz Field
  Pittsburgh, PA
- Game start: 12:21 p.m. EDT
- Elapsed time: 4:31
- Game attendance: 37,100
- Game weather: 82°F • SW 8 • Mostly Sunny
- Referee: David Epperley
- TV announcers (Raycom):
  Play-by-Play: Tom Werme
  Analyst: Dave Archer
  Sideline: Lericia Harris

Scoring summary
1	10:54	SU	Aaron Hackett 1 yard pass from Eric Dungey (Andre Szmyt kick)	SU 7–0
1	6:32	SU	Jarveon Howard 2 yard TD run (Andre Szmyt kick)	SU 14–0
1	5:47	PITT	Qadree Ollison 69 yard TD run (Alex Kessman Kick)	SU 14–7
1	4:21	PITT	Dane Jackson 35 yard fumble return for TD (Alex Kessman Kick)	TIED 14–14
2	12:26	PITT	Alex Kessman 54 yard field goal	PITT 14–17
2	6:50	PITT	Alex Kessman 55 yard field goal	PITT 14–20
2	1:30	SU	Andre Szmyt 33 yard field goal	PITT 17–20
3	14:12	PITT	Rafael Araujo-Lopes 68 yard TD pass from Kenny Pickett (Alex Kessman Kick)	PITT 17–27
3	8:12	SU	Jarveon Howard 5 yard TD run (Andre Szmyt Kick)	PITT 24–27
3	0:21	SU	Eric Dungey 21 yard TD run (Andre Szmyt Kick)	SU 31–27
4	11:11	SU	Andre Szmyt 29 yard field goal	SU 34–27
4	7:51	PITT	Darrin Hall 7 yard TD run (Alex Kessman Kick)	TIED 34–34
4	5:53	SU	Andre Szmyt 54 yard field goal	SU 37–34
4	0:08	PITT	Alex Kessman 45 yard field goal	TIED 37–37
OT		PITT	Darrin Hall 3 yard TD run (Alex Kessman kick )	PITT 37–44

=== At Notre Dame ===
Pittsburgh at Notre Dame

Team	1	2	3	4	Total
Panthers	7	0	7	0	14
• No. 5 Fighting Irish	0	6	6	7	19

- Date: October 13
- Location:
  Notre Dame Stadium
  Notre Dame, IN
- Game start: 2:41 p.m. EDT
- Elapsed time: 3:05
- Game attendance: 77,622
- Game weather: 49°F • SW 9 • Sunny
- Referee: Gary Patterson
- TV announcers (NBC):
  Play-by-Play: Mike Tirico
  Analyst: Doug Flutie

Scoring summary
1	1:26	PITT	Qadree Ollison 9 yd run (Alex Kessman kick)	PITT 7–0
2	4:34	ND	Justin Yoon 22 yd FG	PITT 7–3
2	0:05	ND	Justin Yoon 41 yd FG	PITT 7–6
3	14:46	PITT	Maurice Ffrench 99 yd kick return (Alex Kessman kick)	PITT 14–6
3	2:09	ND	Chase Claypool 16 yd pass from Ian Book (failed 2pt pass)	PITT 14–12
4	5:43	ND	Miles Boykin 35 yd pass from Ian Book (Justin Yoon kick)	ND 14–19

=== Duke ===
Duke at Pittsburgh

Team	1	2	3	4	Total
Blue Devils	7	14	21	3	45
• Panthers	7	10	18	19	54

- Date: October 27
- Location:
  Heinz Field
  Pittsburgh, PA
- Game start: 3:33 p.m. EDT
- Elapsed time: 3:21
- Game attendance: 31,510
- Game weather: 45°F • NE 4 • Light rain
- Referee: David Epperley
- TV announcers (ACCRSN):
  Play-by-Play: Wes Durham
  Analyst: James Bates

Scoring summary
1	11:04	PITT	Kenny Pickett 30 yd run (Alex Kessman kick)	PITT 0–7
1	7:12	DUKE	Quentin Harris 6 yd run (Collin Wareham kick)	TIED 7–7
2	11:41	DUKE	T.J. Rahming 3 yd pass from Daniel Jones (Collin Wareham kick)	DUKE 14–7
2	7:24	PITT	Alex Kessman 27 yd FG	DUKE 14–10
2	5:38	DUKE	T.J. Rahming 4 yd pass from Daniel Jones (Collin Wareham kick)	DUKE 21–10
2	4:07	PITT	Maurice Ffrench 50 yd pass from Kenny Pickett (Alex Kessman kick)	DUKE 21–17
3	13:41	DUKE	Deon Jackson 74 yd pass from Daniel Jones (Collin Wareham kick)	DUKE 28–17
3	10:22	PITT	Qadree Ollison 4 yd run (Rafael Araujo-Lopes 2pt pass from Kenny Pickett)	DUKE 28–25
3	7:45	DUKE	Quentin Harris 1 yd run (Collin Wareham kick)	DUKE 35–25
3	4:56	PITT	V'Lique Carter 31 yd run (Alex Kessman kick)	DUKE 35–32
3	3:57	DUKE	Johnathan Lloyd 68 yd pass from Daniel Jones (Collin Wareham kick)	DUKE 42–32
3	0:31	PITT	Alex Kessman 54 yd FG	DUKE 42–35
4	10:39	PITT	V'Lique Carter 16 yd run (Alex Kessman kick)	TIED 42–42
4	8:07	DUKE	Collin Wareham 25 yd FG	DUKE 45–42
4	2:33	PITT	Alex Kessman 48 yd FG	TIED 45–45
4	0:05	PITT	Maurice Ffrench 25 yd pass from Kenny Pickett (Alex Kessman kick)	PITT 45–52
4	0:00	PITT	Team safety	PITT 45–54

=== At Virginia ===
Pittsburgh at Virginia

Team	1	2	3	4	Total
• Panthers	7	0	7	9	23
No. 23 Cavaliers	7	3	0	3	13

- Date: November 2
- Location:
  Scott Stadium
  Charlottesville, VA
- Game start: 7:31 p.m. EDT
- Elapsed time: 3:15
- Game attendance: 36,256
- Game weather: 65°F • NE 12 • Heavy rain
- Referee: Riley Johnson
- TV announcers (ESPN2):
  Play-by-Play: Clay Matvick
  Analyst: Dan Orlovsky

Scoring summary
1	6:09	PITT	Darrin Hall 41 yard run (Alex Kessman kick)	PITT 7–0
1	5:54	UVA	Terrell Jana 42 yard pass from Bryce Perkins (Brian Delaney kick)	TIED 7–7
2	0:02	UVA	Brian Delaney 29 yard field goal	UVA 7–10
3	0:21	PITT	Darrin Hall 2 yard run (Alex Kessman kick)	PITT 14–10
4	9:51	UVA	Brian Delaney 42 yard field goal	PITT 14–13
4	9:40	PITT	Darrin Hall 75 yard run (failed 2pt rush)	PITT 20–13
4	4:25	PITT	Alex Kessman 53 yard field goal	PITT 23–13

=== Virginia Tech ===
Virginia Tech at Pittsburgh

Team	1	2	3	4	Total
Hokies	0	7	8	7	22
• Panthers	10	21	7	14	52

- Date: November 10
- Location:
  Heinz Field
  Pittsburgh, PA
- Game start: 3:32 p.m. EST
- Elapsed time: 3:07
- Game attendance: 44,398
- Game weather: 32°F • W 13 • Clear
- Referee: Jerry Magallanes
- TV announcers (ESPNU):
  Play-by-Play: Kevin Brown
  Analyst: Andre Ware

Scoring summary
1	6:35	PITT	Alex Kessman 48 yard field goal	PITT 0–3
1	1:59	PITT	Qadree Ollison 8 yard run (Alex Kessman kick)	PITT 0–10
2	14:01	PITT	Maurice Ffrench 78 yard pass from Kenny Pickett (Alex Kessman kick)	PITT 0–17
2	6:38	VT	Eric Kumah 29 yard pass from Ryan Willis (Jordan Stout kick)	PITT 7–17
2	2:54	PITT	Maurice Ffrench 12 yard run (Alex Kessman kick)	PITT 7–24
2	0:35	PITT	George Aston 1 yard run (Alex Kessman kick)	PITT 7–31
3	5:00	VT	Eric Kumah 5 yard pass from Ryan Willis (Eric Kumah pass from Ryan Willis)	PITT 15–31
3	4:04	PITT	Darrin Hall 73 yard run (Alex Kessman kick)	PITT 15–38
4	12:34	VT	Damon Hazelton 24 yard pass from Ryan Willis (Jordan Stout kick)	PITT 22–38
4	8:48	PITT	Qadree Ollison 31 yard run (Alex Kessman kick)	PITT 22–45
4	4:43	PITT	Qadree Ollison 97 yard run (Alex Kessman kick)	PITT 22–52

=== At Wake Forest ===
Pittsburgh at Wake Forest

Team	1	2	3	4	Total
• Panthers	0	6	14	14	34
Demon Deacons	3	7	0	3	13

- Date: November 17
- Location:
  BB&T Field
  Winston-Salem, NC
- Game start: 12:04 p.m. EST
- Elapsed time: 3:01
- Game attendance: 25,609
- Game weather: 54°F • ENE 4 • Sunny
- Referee: Duane Heydt
- TV announcers (ACCRSN):
  Play-by-Play: Evan Lepler
  Analyst: Takeo Spikes

Scoring summary
1	10:50	WF	Nick Sciba 32 yard field goal	WF 0–3
2	4:03	PITT	Darrin Hall 2 yard run (Alex Kessman kick blocked)	PITT 6–3
2	1:32	WF	Alex Bachman 28 yard pass from Jamie Newman (Nick Sciba kick)	WF 6–10
3	4:03	PITT	Rafael Araujo-Lopes 4 yard pass from Kenny Pickett (Alex Kessman kick)	PITT 13–10
3	1:14	PITT	Taysir Mack 63 yard pass from Kenny Pickett (Alex Kessman kick)	PITT 20–10
4	12:30	WF	Nick Sciba 20 yard field goal	PITT 20–13
4	7:27	PITT	Maurice Ffrench 23 yard pass from Kenny Pickett (Alex Kessman kick)	PITT 27–13
4	4:43	PITT	Stefano Millin 6 yard run (Alex Kessman kick)	PITT 34–13

=== At Miami (FL) ===
Pittsburgh at Miami (FL)

Team	1	2	3	4	Total
No. 24 Panthers	0	0	3	0	3
• Hurricanes	3	7	7	7	24

- Date: November 24
- Location:
  Hard Rock Stadium
  Miami Gardens, FL
- Game start: 3:35 p.m. EST
- Elapsed time: 3:25
- Game attendance: 59,606
- Game weather: 82°F • WSW 14 • Partly cloudy
- Referee: Stuart Mullins
- TV announcers (ESPN):
  Play-by-Play: Anish Shroff
  Analyst: Ahmad Brooks

Scoring summary
1	10:17	UM	Bubba Baxa 37 yard field goal	UM 0–3
2	9:08	UM	DeeJay Dallas 65 yard punt return (Bubba Baxa kick)	UM 0–10
3	3:27	PITT	Alex Kessman 40 yard field goal	UM 3–10
3	2:49	UM	Travis Homer 64 yard run (Bubba Baxa kick)	UM 3–17
4	10:58	UM	DeeJay Dallas 3 yard run (Bubba Baxa kick)	UM 3–24

=== Vs. Clemson (ACC Championship game) ===
Pittsburgh vs. Clemson

Team	1	2	3	4	Total
• No. 2 Tigers	14	14	0	14	42
Panthers	3	7	0	0	10

- Date: December 1
- Location:
  Bank of America Stadium
  Charlotte, NC
- Game start: 8:14 p.m. EST
- Elapsed time: 3:16
- Game attendance: 67,784
- Game weather: 55°F • ESE 7 • Rain
- Referee: Jeff Heaser
- TV announcers (ABC):
  Play-by-Play: Chris Fowler
  Analyst: Kirk Herbstreit

Scoring summary
1	14:47	CU	Travis Etienne 75 yd run (Greg Huegel kick)	CU 7–0
1	9:29	CU	Travis Etienne 3 yd run (Greg Huegel kick)	CU 14–0
1	1:46	PITT	Alex Kessman 37 yd FG	CU 14–3
2	7:56	PITT	Qadree Ollison 1 yd run (Alex Kessman kick)	CU 14–10
2	4:57	CU	Tee Higgins 5 yd pass from Trevor Lawrence (Greg Huegel kick)	CU 21–10
2	0:25	CU	Tee Higgins 10 yd pass from Trevor Lawrence (Greg Huegel kick)	CU 28–10
4	14:27	CU	Adam Choice 1 yd run (Greg Huegel kick)	CU 35–10
4	3:17	CU	Lyn-J Dixon 4 yd run (Greg Huegel kick)	CU 42–10

=== Vs. Stanford (Sun Bowl) ===
Pittsburgh vs. Stanford

Team	1	2	3	4	Total
• Cardinal	0	7	0	7	14
Panthers	0	10	3	0	13

- Date: December 31
- Location:
  Sun Bowl Stadium
  El Paso, TX
- Game start: 2:10 p.m. EST
- Elapsed time: 3:32
- Game attendance: 40,680
- Game weather: 46°F • WSW 10 • Sunny
- Referee: David Smith
- TV announcers (CBS):
  Play-by-Play: Brad Nessler
  Analyst: Gary Danielson

Scoring summary
2	14:14	PITT	Alex Kessman 29 yard field goal	PITT 0–3
2	7:39	STAN	Cameron Scarlett 1 yd run (Jet Toner kick)	STAN 7–3
2	2:32	PITT	Darrin Hall 6 yd run (Alex Kessman kick)	PITT 7–10
3	8:13	PITT	Alex Kessman 28 yard field goal	PITT 7–13
4	11:28	STAN	Cameron Scarlett 0 yard fumble return for TD (Jet Toner kick)	STAN 14–13

== 2019 NFL draft ==
Player	Position	Round	Pick	NFL club
Qadree Ollison	RB	5	152	Atlanta Falcons
