= 2018 Sun Bowl =

College football bowl game

2018 Hyundai Sun Bowl
- 85th Sun Bowl
Stanford Cardinal	Pittsburgh Panthers
(8–4)	(7–6)
Pac-12	ACC
14	13
Head coach: David Shaw	Head coach: Pat Narduzzi
	1	2	3	4	Total
Stanford	0	7	0	7	14
Pittsburgh	0	10	3	0	13
- Date: December 31, 2018
- Season: 2018
- Stadium: Sun Bowl
- Location: El Paso, Texas
- MVP: Cameron Scarlett (RB, Stanford)
- Favorite: Stanford by 6.5
- Referee: David Smith (SEC)
- Attendance: 40,680
- Payout: US$3,448,000

United States TV coverage
- Network: CBS
- Announcers: Brad Nessler (play-by-play); Gary Danielson (color); Jamie Erdahl (sidelines)

The 2018 Sun Bowl was a college football bowl game that was played on Monday, December 31, 2018. It was the 85th edition of the Sun Bowl, and was one of the 2018–19 bowl games concluding the 2018 FBS football season. Sponsored by Hyundai Motor America, the game was officially known as the Hyundai Sun Bowl.

== Teams ==
The game featured Stanford of the Pac-12 Conference and Pittsburgh of the Atlantic Coast Conference (ACC). The two programs have previously met three times, most recently in 1932, with Pittsburgh holding a 2–1 series lead. The referee for the game, David Smith of the Southeastern Conference (SEC), was the quarterback and MVP for Alabama in the 1988 Sun Bowl.

=== Stanford Cardinal ===
Stanford started off the season with four straight wins, including a victory over rival USC, and they rose in the polls from No. 13 to No. 7 by the time they met Notre Dame on September 29. They lost, 38–17, which dropped them to No. 14. This began a stretch where in five games they suffered four losses, to Notre Dame, Utah, Washington State and Washington, which dropped them out of the polls and serious contention for the North Division title in the Pac-12. Stanford finished with three straight wins to end their regular season with eight victories. This was the ninth consecutive season of bowl eligibility for the Cardinal, and it was their first Sun Bowl invite since the 2016 edition.

=== Pittsburgh Panthers ===
Pittsburgh started their season with four losses in their first seven games, losing to ranked opponents such as Penn State, UCF, and Notre Dame. However, the Panthers pulled off a four-game winning streak, including victories over teams such as No. 23 Virginia before closing out their regular season with a loss to Miami. Pittsburgh's 6–2 conference record was good enough for first in the Coastal Division in the ACC, earning them a birth in the ACC Championship Game against No. 2 Clemson, where they were soundly defeated, 42–10. This was the Panthers' first Sun Bowl appearance since the 2008 edition, and tenth bowl appearance in the past eleven seasons.

== Game summary ==
=== Scoring summary ===
Scoring summary

Quarter	Time	Drive			Team	Scoring information	Score	
Quarter	Time	Plays	Yards	TOP	Team	Scoring information	STAN	PITT
2	14:14	6	54	3:04	PITT	29-yard field goal by Alex Kessman	0	3
2	7:39	7	64	4:00	STAN	Cameron Scarlett 1-yard touchdown run, Jet Toner kick good	7	3
2	2:32	9	75	5:07	PITT	Darrin Hall 6-yard touchdown run, Alex Kessman kick good	7	10
3	8:13	6	46	3:04	PITT	28-yard field goal by Alex Kessman	7	13
4	11:28	8	78	3:53	STAN	K. J. Costello (STAN) fumble recovered by Cameron Scarlett in end zone for touchdown, Jet Toner kick good	14	13
"TOP" = time of possession. For other American football terms, see Glossary of American football.							14	13

=== Statistics ===
	1	2	3	4	Total
Cardinal	0	7	0	7	14
Panthers	0	10	3	0	13

Statistics	STAN	PITT
First downs	12	18
Plays–yards	51–208	71–344
Rushes–yards	34–103	42–208
Passing yards	105	136
Passing: comp–att–int	6–17–0	11–29–0
Time of possession	26:21	33:39

Team	Category	Player	Statistics
Stanford	Passing	K. J. Costello	6/17, 105 yds
Stanford	Rushing	Cameron Scarlett	22 car, 94 yds, 2 TD
Stanford	Receiving	J. J. Arcega-Whiteside	3 rec 90 yds
Pittsburgh	Passing	Kenny Pickett	11/29, 136 yds
Pittsburgh	Rushing	Darrin Hall	16 car, 123 yds, 1 TD
Pittsburgh	Receiving	Taysir Mack	4 rec, 68 yds
