= Kenny Pickett =

American football player (born 1998)

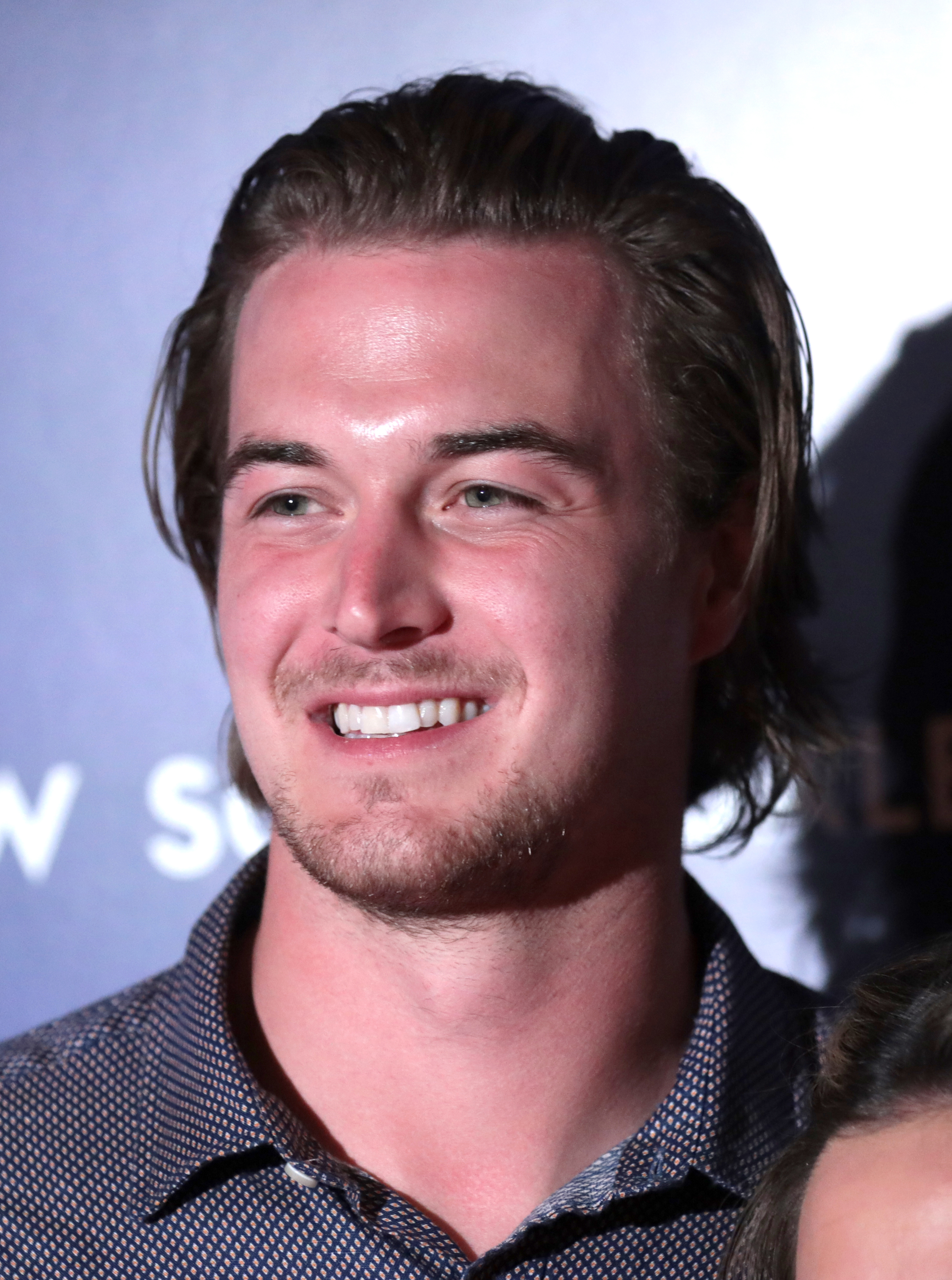
- Pickett in 2023

No. 12 – Carolina Panthers
- Position: Quarterback
- Roster status: Active

Personal information
- Born: June 6, 1998 (age 28); Ocean Township, New Jersey, U.S.
- Listed height: 6 ft 3 in (1.91 m)
- Listed weight: 218 lb (99 kg)

Career information
- High school: Ocean Township (New Jersey)
- College: Pittsburgh (2017–2021)
- NFL draft: 2022: 1st round, 20th overall pick

Career history
- Pittsburgh Steelers (2022–2023); Philadelphia Eagles (2024); Cleveland Browns (2025)*; Las Vegas Raiders (2025); Carolina Panthers (2026–present)
- * Offseason or practice squad member only

Awards and highlights
- Super Bowl champion (LIX); Johnny Unitas Golden Arm Award (2021); First-team All-American (2021); ACC Athlete of the Year (2022); ACC Player of the Year (2021); ACC Offensive Player of the Year (2021); First-team All-ACC (2021)

Career NFL statistics as of Week 7, 2026
- Passing attempts: 805
- Passing completions: 502
- Completion percentage: 62.4%
- TD–INT: 16–16
- Passing yards: 5,000
- Passer rating: 78.3
- Rushing yards: 363
- Rushing touchdowns: 5
- Stats at Pro Football Reference

Kenneth Pickett (born June 6, 1998) is an American professional football quarterback for the Carolina Panthers of the National Football League (NFL). He played college football for the Pittsburgh Panthers, winning the Johnny Unitas Golden Arm Award, ACC Player of the Year, and ACC Athlete of the Year between 2021 and 2022.

Pickett was selected by the Pittsburgh Steelers in the first round of the 2022 NFL draft, spending two seasons as the primary starter and helping the team clinch a playoff appearance in 2023. Due to inconsistent play, he was traded to the Philadelphia Eagles, where he spent one season as a backup and was a member of the team that won Super Bowl LIX. He joined the Las Vegas Raiders as a backup the following year before signing with the Panthers in 2026.

== Early life ==
Pickett was born in the Oakhurst section of Ocean Township, New Jersey. He attended Ocean Township High School and graduated in 2017. Pickett led the Ocean Township Spartans to the New Jersey Central Group III semifinal game as a junior, leading his team to a 9–2 record. 247Sports ranked Pickett as the No. 23 overall high school football player in New Jersey in his senior year. During his high school career, Pickett passed for 4,670 yards with 43 touchdowns and rushed for 873 yards and 17 touchdowns. He originally committed to play college football at Temple University, but changed his commitment to the University of Pittsburgh.

== College career ==
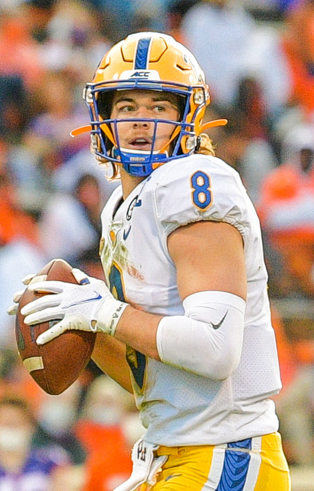
Pickett in 2020

Pickett spent most of his true freshman season at Pittsburgh in 2017 as a backup to Max Browne and Ben DiNucci. He started his first career game in Pittsburgh's final game of the season against the second ranked Miami Hurricanes. During the team's upset victory, Pickett completed 18-of-29 passes for 193 yards with a touchdown and also rushed for 60 yards and two touchdowns. He finished the season completing 39-of-66 passes for 509 yards, a touchdown, and an interception.

Pickett returned as Pittsburgh's starter in 2018. He started all 14 games, completing 180-of-310 passes for 1,969 yards, 12 touchdowns, and six interceptions. Pickett led Pittsburgh to their first ever Atlantic Coast Conference Coastal Division Championship in his first season as the full-time starter. The Associated Press ranked the Panthers as high as the No. 24 team in the country at one point in the 2018 season. The Panthers lost 14–13 to the Stanford Cardinal in the Sun Bowl.

Pickett remained the starter in 2019, making 12 starts and missing one game due to injury. He completed 289-of-469 passes for 3,098 yards, 13 touchdowns, and nine interceptions. This was Pickett's first season with Mark Whipple acting as the offensive coordinator, who increased the amount of passes the offense threw each week. Pickett led the Panthers to a 7–5 record heading into the postseason. The Panthers were selected to the 2019 Quick Lane Bowl in Detroit and defeated the Eastern Michigan Eagles 34–30. Pickett threw for 361 yards and three touchdowns, including a game winning touchdown to wide receiver Taysir Mack in the final minutes of the game.

Pickett and the Panthers played in a shortened season due to the COVID-19 pandemic, finishing with a 6–5 record. Pickett played in nine games and threw for 2,408 yards, 13 touchdowns, and nine interceptions in that stretch. The Associated Press ranked the Panthers as high as the No. 21 team in the country at one point in the 2020 season. Despite being eligible for a bowl game, the Panthers collectively opted out of participating in the postseason.

The NCAA granted all 2020 fall athletes an extra year of eligibility, and Pickett used this option to return as the Panthers' starting quarterback in 2021.

Pickett took advantage of his final year of eligibility and broke out as one of the nation's top players. Pickett recorded 4,319 yards and 42 touchdowns setting school records for single season yards and touchdowns as well as career yards and touchdowns. He was named a first-team All-American and was a finalist for the Heisman Trophy, finishing in third place. Pittsburgh won the ACC Championship and finished 11–2 in games Pickett started, the school's best record since 1976. He graduated with a bachelor's degree in marketing and enrolled at Joseph M. Katz Graduate School of Business. Pickett was also named the men's ACC Athlete of the Year across all sports, sharing honors with women's recipient Charlotte North of Boston College lacrosse.

== Professional career ==
=== Pre-draft ===
Pre-draft measurables
Height	Weight	Arm length	Hand span	Wingspan	40-yard dash	10-yard split	20-yard split	20-yard shuttle	Vertical jump	Broad jump	Wonderlic
6 ft 3 1/4 in (1.91 m)	217 lb (98 kg)	30 7/8 in (0.78 m)	8 1/2 in (0.22 m)	6 ft 1 3/4 in (1.87 m)	4.73 s	1.59 s	2.67 s	4.29 s	33.5 in (0.85 m)	10 ft 1 in (3.07 m)	17
All values from NFL Combine

Pickett's hands, which were measured at 8½ inches, are the smallest hand size measurement for a quarterback. Various journalists prior to the draft scrutinized Pickett's hand size, with some believing that it could make him more prone to fumbling the ball. Pickett had downplayed the importance of the matter, saying that concerns came more frequently from reporters than NFL teams. "Whatever it measures, it measures", Pickett added at the NFL Scouting Combine.

=== Pittsburgh Steelers ===
==== 2022 ====
Pickett was selected by the Pittsburgh Steelers in the first round (20th overall) of the 2022 NFL draft, the highest the Steelers selected a quarterback since drafting Ben Roethlisberger in 2004; the selection was announced by Steelers' legend Franco Harris in one of his last public appearances with the team before his unexpected death on December 20, 2022. With the starting quarterback position wide open following Roethlisberger's retirement, Pickett was named the backup quarterback for the Steelers behind starter Mitchell Trubisky. Initially, Pickett was designated as the team’s third-string quarterback behind both Trubisky and veteran Mason Rudolph, but head coach Mike Tomlin would adjust the depth chart to put Pickett in the backup role citing a "clerical error" with the original depth chart.

Pickett made his NFL debut in the second half of a Week 4 loss against the New York Jets after Trubisky was benched. Pickett completed 10-of-13 passes for 120 yards and rushed for two touchdowns, but threw three interceptions in the 24–20 loss. On his first career pass attempt, Pickett threw a deep ball to wide receiver Chase Claypool that was intercepted by safety Jordan Whitehead. On his second drive, Pickett scored his first NFL touchdown on a one-yard rush.

On October 4, Pickett was named the starter by head coach Tomlin. In his first career start against the Buffalo Bills, Pickett completed 34-of-51 passes for 327 yards and an interception during the 38–3 road loss. The following week against the Tampa Bay Buccaneers, Pickett threw his first touchdown pass to running back Najee Harris, but he exited the narrow 20–18 victory during the third quarter with a concussion.

During Week 14, in a narrow 16–14 loss to the Baltimore Ravens, Pickett once again suffered a concussion. He was ruled out for Week 15 against the Carolina Panthers, but started in Week 16 against the Las Vegas Raiders. Pickett threw a game-winning 14-yard touchdown to wide receiver George Pickens with under a minute left and finished the 13–10 victory with 244 passing yards, the aforementioned touchdown, and an interception.

During Week 17 against the Ravens, Pickett threw the game-winning touchdown with under a minute left for the second consecutive game; a 10-yard pass to Harris. Pickett finished the 16–13 road victory with 168 passing yards and the touchdown, keeping the Steelers' playoff hopes alive. Pickett became the first rookie quarterback in NFL history to throw a game-winning touchdown in the final minute of the fourth quarter in two consecutive games.

Pickett finished his rookie season with 2,404 passing yards, seven touchdowns, and nine interceptions, to go along with 55 carries for 237 yards and three touchdowns in 13 games with 12 starts.

==== 2023 ====
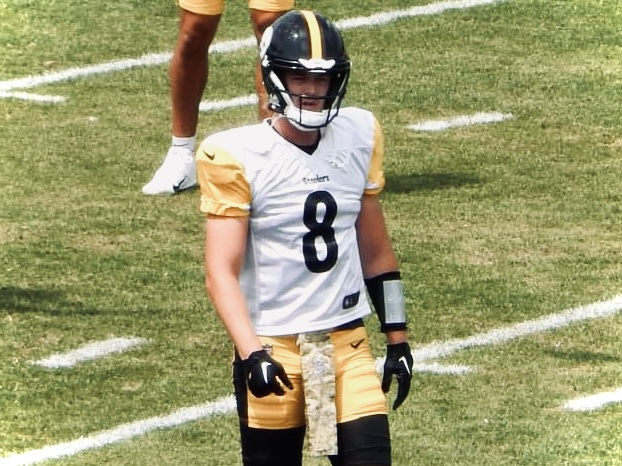
Pickett in 2023

During Week 3 against the Raiders, Pickett threw for 235 yards and two touchdowns in the 23–18 road victory, marking his first professional game with multiple touchdown passes. In the next game against the Houston Texans, Pickett completed 15-of-23 passes for 114 yards and an interception before leaving the eventual 30–6 road loss in the third quarter with a bone bruise. Three weeks later against the Los Angeles Rams, Pickett had 230 passing yards and scored his first rushing touchdown of the season on a quarterback sneak in the 24–17 road victory.

During a Week 8 loss of 20–10 to the Jacksonville Jaguars, Pickett had 73 passing yards and suffered a rib injury late in the second quarter and did not return. However, he started in the next game against the Tennessee Titans and threw for 160 yards and the game-winning touchdown during the 20–16 victory.

In Week 13 against the Arizona Cardinals, Pickett had 70 passing yards before leaving the 24–10 loss with a high ankle sprain. He underwent surgery to accelerate the healing process on his ankle.

In the regular-season finale against the Ravens, Pickett was listed as active for the first time since his injury, but was demoted to backup duties following the success of Mason Rudolph. Rudolph started in the Steelers' 31–17 Wild Card loss to the Buffalo Bills.

Pickett finished his second professional season with 2,070 passing yards and the lowest touchdown percentage of all eligible starting quarterbacks in the league, only throwing for six touchdowns (as well as four interceptions) out of 324 pass attempts across 12 games and as many starts. Pickett's passer rating improved from 76.7 to 81.4.

=== Philadelphia Eagles ===
Following the Steelers' signing of Russell Wilson in the 2024 offseason, Pickett requested a trade. On March 16, 2024, he was traded to the Philadelphia Eagles along with a 2024 fourth-round pick (No. 120; Jaylen Wright) in exchange for a 2024 third-round pick (No. 98; Payton Wilson) and two 2025 seventh-round picks (No. 223 went to the Seattle Seahawks where they selected Damien Martinez) (No. 229; Donte Kent).

Pickett entered the season as the backup quarterback behind incumbent starter Jalen Hurts, despite a competition with Tanner McKee. Pickett made his Eagles debut during a Week 7 28–3 road victory over the New York Giants. He attempted one pass, but it fell incomplete. Three weeks later, in a 34–6 road victory over the Dallas Cowboys, Pickett would relieve Hurts, completing 1-of-2 passes for five yards.

During Week 16 against the Washington Commanders, Pickett replaced Hurts after he was ruled out with a concussion. Pickett finished the 36–33 road loss with 143 passing yards, a touchdown and an interception. Despite suffering a rib injury, he did not miss any plays. Pickett was named the Eagles' starter for the Week 17 matchup against the Cowboys. He completed 10-of-15 passes for 143 yards and a touchdown, while also rushing for a touchdown before leaving the eventual 41–7 victory in the third quarter with a rib injury.

At the end of the NFC Championship game against the Washington Commanders, Pickett was substituted in for Hurts to kneel out the 55–23 victory. Pickett won his first Super Bowl when the Eagles defeated the Kansas City Chiefs in Super Bowl LIX. Pickett finished the game at quarterback for the Eagles, handing the ball off, attempting one pass, and then kneeling to close out the 40–22 victory.

=== Cleveland Browns ===
On March 12, 2025, the Eagles traded Pickett to the Cleveland Browns in exchange for Dorian Thompson-Robinson and a fifth-round pick in the 2025 NFL draft. Pickett entered training camp in a four-way competition with Joe Flacco, Dillon Gabriel, and Shedeur Sanders for Cleveland's starting quarterback role. A hamstring injury limited his participation in camp, and Pickett was named Flacco's backup before the start of the 2025 NFL season.

=== Las Vegas Raiders ===
On August 25, 2025, Pickett was traded to the Las Vegas Raiders in exchange for a fifth-round pick (141st overall) in the 2026 NFL draft. He spent the 2025 season as the backup to Geno Smith. After Smith hurt his shoulder in a Week 14 loss to the Denver Broncos, Pickett entered the game and made all but three of his 11 passes for 96 yards and a touchdown. Pickett was named the starter for the following week against the Philadelphia Eagles, where he completed 15-of-25 passes for 64 yards, was intercepted once, and sacked four times as the Raiders lost 31–0. Smith returned to the starting position for Week 16.

=== Carolina Panthers ===
On March 11, 2026, Pickett signed a one-year, $4 million contract with the Carolina Panthers.

== Career statistics ==
=== NFL ===
Legend
	Won the Super Bowl
**Bold**	Career high

==== Regular season ====
Year	Team	Games			Passing									Rushing					Sacked		Fumbles	
Year	Team	GP	GS	Record	Cmp	Att	Pct	Yds	Y/A	Lng	TD	Int	Rtg	Att	Yds	Y/A	Lng	TD	Sck	SckY	Fum	Lost
2022	PIT	13	12	7–5	**245**	**389**	**63.0**	**2,404**	6.2	57	**7**	**9**	76.7	**55**	**237**	4.3	**23**	**3**	**27**	**182**	**4**	**1**
2023	PIT	12	12	7–5	201	324	62.0	2,070	6.4	**72**	6	4	81.4	42	54	1.3	11	1	23	173	2	0
2024	PHI	5	1	**1–0**	25	42	59.5	291	**6.9**	49	2	1	**86.5**	9	15	1.7	8	1	4	33	1	0
2025	LV	6	2	1–1	28	45	62.2	188	4.2	26	1	2	60.2	5	22	**4.4**	9	0	8	54	1	**1**
2026	CAR	3	0	0–0	3	5	60.0	47	9.4	32	0	0	91.2	3	35	11.7	24	0	0	0	0	0
Career		39	27	16–11	502	805	62.4	5,000	6.2	72	16	16	78.3	114	363	3.2	24	5	62	442	8	2

==== Postseason ====
Year	Team	Games			Passing									Rushing					Sacked		Fumbles	
Year	Team	GP	GS	Record	Cmp	Att	Pct	Yds	Y/A	Lng	TD	Int	Rtg	Att	Yds	Y/A	Lng	TD	Sck	SckY	Fum	Lost
2023	PIT	0	0	—	DNP																	
2024	PHI	2	0	—	0	1	0.0	0	0.0	0	0	0	39.6	5	−7	−1.4	−1	0	0	0	0	0
Career		2	0	—	0	1	0.0	0	0.0	0	0	0	39.6	5	−7	−1.4	−1	0	0	0	0	0

=== College ===
Season	Team	Games			Passing							Rushing			
Season	Team	GP	GS	Record	Cmp	Att	Yds	Pct	TD	Int	Rtg	Att	Yds	Avg	TD
2017	Pittsburgh	4	1	1–0	39	66	509	59.1	1	1	125.8	26	98	**3.6**	0
2018	Pittsburgh	**14**	**14**	7–7	180	310	1,969	58.1	12	6	120.3	**117**	220	1.9	3
2019	Pittsburgh	12	12	7–5	289	469	3,098	61.6	13	**9**	122.4	95	110	1.2	2
2020	Pittsburgh	9	9	6–3	203	332	2,408	61.1	13	**9**	129.6	81	145	1.8	**8**
2021	Pittsburgh	13	13	**11–2**	**334**	**497**	**4,319**	**67.2**	**42**	7	**165.3**	98	**233**	2.4	5
Career		52	49	32–17	1,045	1,674	12,303	62.4	81	32	136.3	417	801	1.9	20

== Personal life ==
Pickett married Amy Paternoster, a former women's soccer player at Princeton University, on June 24, 2023. His sister, Alex, played collegiate soccer at East Stroudsburg, and became the coach of Seton Hill University's women's soccer team in 2019.

From 2022 to 2024, Pickett resided in Cranberry, a suburb of Pittsburgh. He sold his home in Cranberry following his trade to the Philadelphia Eagles in early 2024.
