= Cory Sanders =

American football coach (born 1985)

Current position
- Title: Defensive coordinator
- Team: Pittsburgh
- Conference: ACC

Biographical details
- Born: March 26, 1985 (age 41); Grand Rapids, Michigan, U.S.
- Education: Saint Joseph's College (2007)

Playing career
- 2003–2006: Saint Joseph's (IN)
- Position: Defensive back

Coaching career (HC unless noted)
- 2007: North Central (IL) (DB)
- 2008–2009: Elmhurst (DB)
- 2010: Saint Joseph's (IN) (DC)
- 2011–2014: Saint Joseph's (IN)
- 2015–2016: West Florida (DC/DB)
- 2017: Western Michigan (DB)
- 2018–2023: Pittsburgh (S)
- 2024–2025: Pittsburgh (AHC/S)
- 2026–present: Pittsburgh (DC)

Head coaching record
- Overall: 23–18

Cory Sanders (born March 26, 1985) is an American college football coach. He is the defensive coordinator for the University of Pittsburgh, a position he has held since 2026. He was the head football coach for Saint Joseph's College in Collegeville, Indiana, from 2011 to 2014. He also coached for North Central, Elmhurst, West Florida, and Western Michigan. He played college football for Saint Joseph's as a defensive back.

== Head coaching record ==
Year	Team	Overall	Conference	Standing	Bowl/playoffs
Saint Joseph's Pumas (Great Lakes Football Conference) (2011)
2011	Saint Joseph's	2–8	1–2	3rd	
Saint Joseph's Pumas (Great Lakes Valley Conference) (2012–2014)
2012	Saint Joseph's	6–5	5–3	T–3rd	
2013	Saint Joseph's	7–3	5–2	T–2nd	
2014	Saint Joseph's	8–3	5–3	T–2nd	
Saint Joseph's:		23–18	16–10		
Total:		23–18			
