= Ethan Bonner =

American football player (born 1999)

No. 27 – Miami Dolphins
- Position: Cornerback
- Roster status: Practice squad

Personal information
- Born: October 23, 1999 (age 27); Meridian, Mississippi, U.S.
- Listed height: 6 ft 1 in (1.85 m)
- Listed weight: 192 lb (87 kg)

Career information
- High school: The Woodlands (The Woodlands, Texas)
- College: Stanford (2018–2022)
- NFL draft: 2023: undrafted

Career history
- Miami Dolphins (2023–present)

Career NFL statistics as of 2025
- Total tackles: 17
- Pass deflections: 1
- Interceptions: 1
- Stats at Pro Football Reference

Ethan Kelly Bonner (born October 23, 1999) is an American professional football cornerback for the Miami Dolphins of the National Football League (NFL). He played college football for the Stanford Cardinal.

== Early life ==
Bonner was born in Meridian, Mississippi to Alan and Trisha Bonner. He has one sister, Olivia. He attended The Woodlands High School under head coach Mark Schmid. During his high school career, he was the nation's 78th best cornerback by ESPN and 106th by 247Sports. He also competed in track in high school under head coach Juris Green, running the 4x200m in 1:23.25 for a national high school record.

== College career ==
Bonner played college football for Stanford Cardinal football where he majored in economics. As a freshman in 2018, he played in each of the last four games and was eligible to retain year of eligibility via NCAA redshirt rules. He made his collegiate debut and recorded first career tackle in a win over Oregon State on November 10th.

As a sophomore in 2019, he did not see any collegiate action.

As a junior in 2020, he played in two games with one start. He totaled eight tackles and one tackle for loss. He made his first career start and finished with a career-high five tackles against Oregon on November 7th.

As a senior in 2021, he appeared in five games, making four starts at cornerback. He finished the season with 21 tackles, 15 solo. His career high of eight tackles came against Cal on November 20th.

Bonner played a fifth year in 2022 and started 10 games at cornerback. He ended the season with 29 tackles, 20 solo, 3 tackles for loss and five pass breakups. He was the Stanford Defensive Player of the Week on Week 7 against Notre Dame.

== Professional career ==
Pre-draft measurables
Height	Weight	Arm length	Hand span	Wingspan	40-yard dash	10-yard split	20-yard split	20-yard shuttle	Three-cone drill	Vertical jump	Broad jump
6 ft 1 in (1.85 m)	186 lb (84 kg)	31 in (0.79 m)	9 3/8 in (0.24 m)	6 ft 2 3/8 in (1.89 m)	4.40 s	1.57 s	2.56 s	4.18 s	6.78 s	35.5 in (0.90 m)	10 ft 7 in (3.23 m)
All values from Pro Day

Bonner signed with the Miami Dolphins as an undrafted free agent on May 12, 2023. He was waived on August 29, and re-signed to the practice squad. Bonner signed a reserve/future contract with Miami on January 15, 2024.

On August 31, 2026, Bonner was waived by the Dolphins. The following day, Miami re–signed Bonner to their practice squad.
