= The Woodlands High School =

Public high school in The Woodlands, Texas

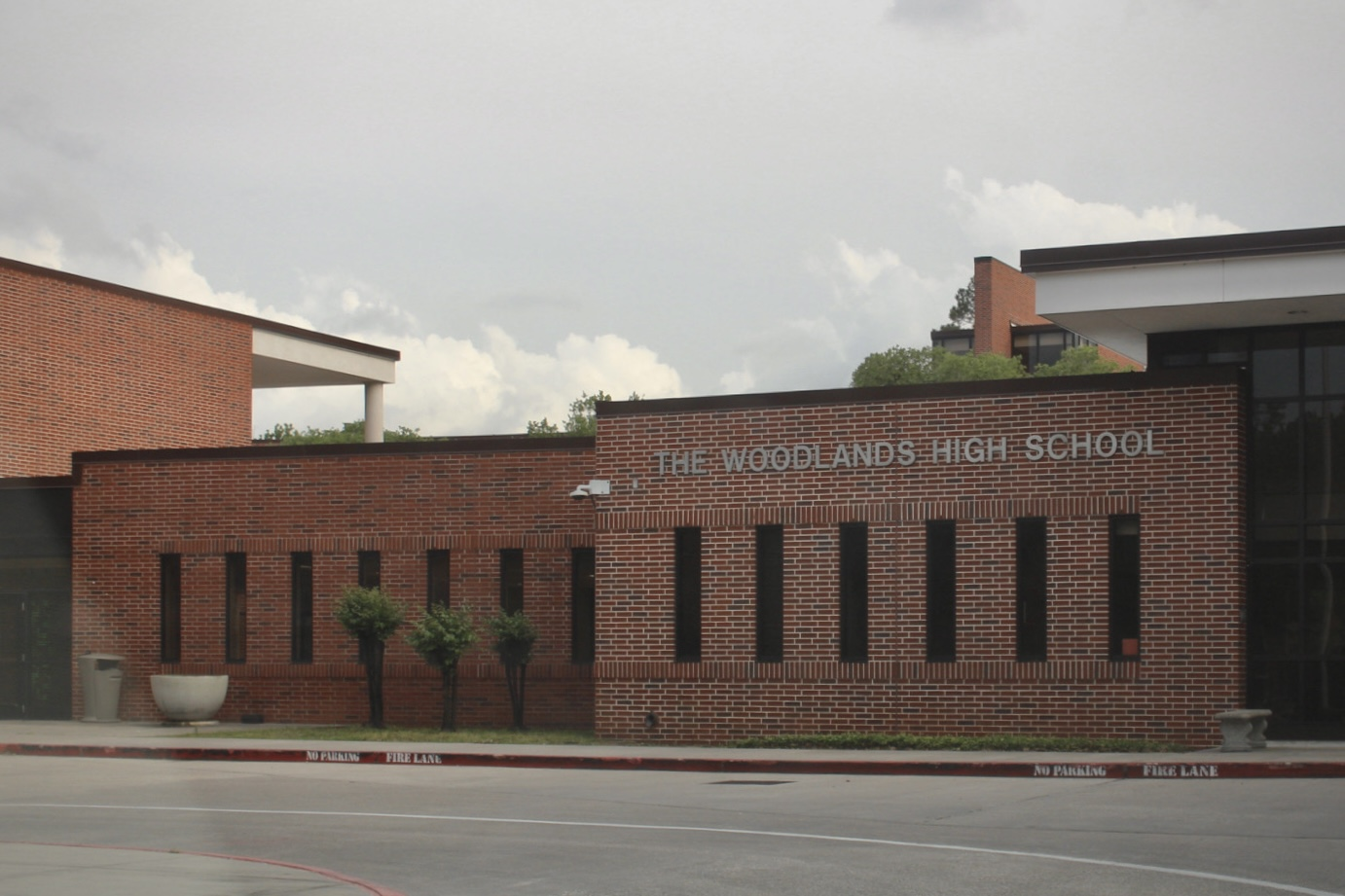

Location
- 6101 Research Forest Drive; The Woodlands, Texas 77381-6028; United States; 30°11′40″N 95°30′12″W

Information
- School type: Public high school
- Motto: A Tradition of Excellence
- Established: 1996
- School district: Conroe Independent School District
- Principal: Dennis Muehsler
- Teaching staff: 248.15 (FTE)
- Grades: 9–12
- Enrollment: 4,444 (2024-2025)
- Student to teacher ratio: 17.91
- Campus: City: Midsize
- Colors: Forest green, red, and white
- Athletics conference: UIL Class 6A
- Nickname: Highlanders
- Newspaper: The Caledonian
- Website: twhs.conroeisd.net

The Woodlands High School is a public high school located in The Woodlands, Texas, and is a part of the Conroe Independent School District. The majority of the Woodlands, as well as some unincorporated areas in Montgomery County, are served by The Woodlands High School. In 2025, the school received an A grade from the Texas Education Agency.

== History ==
=== Establishment and early years ===
The development of The Woodlands High School was closely connected to the growth of The Woodlands, a master-planned community in Montgomery County, Texas. The community was developed by George P. Mitchell, whose vision included residential neighborhoods, commercial areas, recreational facilities, and educational institutions. As the community expanded during the 1970s and 1980s, the need for additional public educational facilities increased.

Before The Woodlands High School was established, McCullough High School served as the primary public high school for The Woodlands community. McCullough opened in 1976 and was named after J. L. "Mac" McCullough, a former Conroe Independent School District superintendent who worked in the district for 50 years as a teacher, football coach, principal, and administrator. The school initially served students throughout southern Montgomery County until Oak Ridge High School opened in 1981.

As the population of The Woodlands continued to increase, Conroe Independent School District developed plans for another high school campus. The Woodlands High School opened in 1996 on Research Forest Drive. Following its opening, McCullough High School continued operating as an additional campus of The Woodlands High School, serving ninth- and tenth-grade students, while the Research Forest Drive campus primarily housed upperclassmen.

=== Expansion and campus development ===
During the early 2000s, continued population growth in The Woodlands and surrounding communities increased enrollment in Conroe Independent School District. McCullough operated as The Woodlands High School McCullough Campus, serving freshmen and sophomores. The arrangement allowed the district to accommodate enrollment while maintaining the two-campus organization of the high school.

In 2005, The Woodlands College Park High School opened to serve the growing population of southern Montgomery County. The opening resulted in changes to the district's high school attendance zones and campus organization. McCullough returned to operating as a junior high school, serving seventh- and eighth-grade students, while the former Branch Crossing Junior High School became The Woodlands High School Ninth Grade Campus.

The Woodlands High School subsequently developed its present two-campus structure. The main campus on Research Forest Drive serves students in grades 10 through 12, while the ninth-grade campus on Branch Crossing Drive serves ninth-grade students. Both campuses operate as part of the same high school under Conroe Independent School District.

=== Academic and extracurricular development ===
The Woodlands High School has developed academic programs and extracurricular activities across a variety of subjects and disciplines. Its academic offerings include Advanced Placement courses in mathematics, science, history, languages, and the arts. During the 1997–1998 school year, the school was recognized as a National Blue Ribbon School by the United States Department of Education.

The school's extracurricular programs include academic competitions, theatre, choir, orchestra, debate, student organizations, and other activities. The theatre department has participated in the University Interscholastic League's One-Act Play competition and received recognition at the state level, winning the state championship in 2000.

The Woodlands High School Band has received national recognition for its concert and marching programs. The John Philip Sousa Foundation awarded the band the Sudler Flag of Honor in 2003 and the Sudler Shield in 2009 and 2018. The school's Wind Ensemble has also performed at The Midwest Clinic in 2003 and 2012.

== Campuses ==
The Woodlands takes pupils in grades 9 to 12, divided between the two campuses:

- The Woodlands High School: grades 10–12
- The Woodlands High School 9th Grade Campus (formerly Branch Crossing Junior High School): grade 9

From 1976 until the opening of The Woodlands High School in 1996, McCullough High School served The Woodlands community. McCullough High School, named after J.L. McCullough, also housed seventh and eighth graders until Knox Junior High opened its doors in 1978. When The Woodlands High School opened on August 26, 1996, McCullough served The Woodlands community as a junior high school. From 2000 to 2005, McCullough was known as "The Woodlands High School McCullough Campus," housing freshmen and sophomores. Since 2005, with the opening of The Woodlands College Park High School, McCullough has once again served the community as a junior high school.

== Demographics ==
In the 2024-25 school year, The Woodlands High School had 4,444 students, including students at the 9th-grade campus. The ethnic distribution, based on enrollment, was:

- (0.38%) were American Indian/Alaska Native
- (9.42%) were Asian
- (4.88%) were Black
- (29.66%) were Hispanic
- (51.53%) were White
- (0.11%) were Native Hawaiian/Pacific Islander
- (4.00%) were Two or More Races

11.88% of students were eligible for free or reduced-price lunch.

== Academics ==
In 1997–98, The Woodlands High School was named a Blue Ribbon School by the United States Department of Education. For each school year, the Texas Education Agency rates school performance using an A–F grading system based on statistical data. For 2024-2025, the school received a score of 92 out of 100, resulting in an A grade. The school received a similar score of 95 the previous year.

The Woodlands High School was ranked 295 in Newsweek’s 2011 list of the Best High Schools in the United States. The school was ranked based on graduation rate, college matriculation rate, AP tests taken per graduate, average SAT/ACT scores, average AP scores, and AP courses offered. Newsweek has ranked the school among America's top 1,000 high schools on several occasions. Additionally, in its 2013 ranking of America's Best High Schools, U.S. News & World Report awarded a Gold Medal to The Woodlands High School. This means The Woodlands High School ranked among the top 500 schools nationally (out of 21,035 schools) using a College Readiness Index heavily weighted on success on Advanced Placement examinations. The Woodlands High School has also been awarded the University Interscholastic League Class 5A Lone Star Cup on five occasions (2006, 2008, 2009, 2010, and 2011). This award is intended to honor the best overall academic and athletic program in the state of Texas, as determined by success at UIL-sanctioned activities.

The Woodlands High School has a relatively extensive College Board Advanced Placement program that includes the following courses: art history, biology, calculus AB and BC, chemistry, Chinese language and culture, computer science A, English language and literature, environmental science, European history, French language, German language, human geography, Japanese language and culture, macroeconomics, music theory, physics C, psychology, Spanish language, statistics, studio art, U.S. history, U.S. government and politics, and world history.

== Athletics ==
The Woodlands Highlanders compete in baseball, basketball, cross country, football, golf, lacrosse, powerlifting, soccer, softball, swimming and diving, tennis, track and field, volleyball, water polo, and wrestling.

In 2006, The Woodlands baseball team finished the season with a 38–1 record and won the Texas UIL 5A State Championship. They were also named National Champions by Baseball America. The 2006 team included future Major League Players Kyle Drabek and Paul Goldschmidt.

In 2011, The Woodlands softball team finished the season with a 44–1 record and won the Texas UIL 5A State Championship. They were also named National Champions by the National Fastpitch Coaches Association/USA Today and ESPN/Rise. The coaching staff was named NFCA National Coaching Staff of the year.

Due to the similarity of its red "W" logo, the University of Wisconsin threatened to bring legal action against TWHS, which agreed to phase out the logo.

=== State athletic titles ===
- Boys baseball
  - 2000 (5A), 2006 (5A), 2013 (5A) 2018 (6A)
- Boys cross country
  - 1999 (5A), 2000 (5A), 2003 (5A), 2004 (5A), 2006 (5A), 2007 (5A), 2008 (5A), 2009 (5A), 2010 (5A), 2015 (6A), 2016 (6A), 2017 (6A), 2018 (6A)
- Girls cross country
  - 2008 (5A)
- Boys golf
  - 2002 (5A), 2005 (5A), 2007 (5A), 2012 (5A)
- Girls golf
  - T2001 (5A), 2002 (5A), 2003 (5A)
- Girls soccer
  - 2010 (5A)
- Boys swimming
  - 1997, 1998, 1999, 2004 (5A), 2010 (5A), 2021 (6A)
- Girls swimming
  - 1989, 1990, 1991, 1992, 1993, 2006 (5A), 2009 (5A), 2017 (6A), 2018 (6A), 2021 (6A), 2023 (6A), 2024 (6A)
- Girls softball
  - 2011 (5A), 2014 (5A), 2015 (6A)
- Girls volleyball
  - 2011 (5A), 2014 (5A), 2015 (6A), 2018 (6A), 2023 (6A)
- Boys track and field
  - 999 (5A), 2017 (6A), 2018 (6A)
- Boys tennis
  - 2023 (6A)

Additionally, the school has won the Lone Star Cup eight times, most recently as a 6A school in 2020-2021.

== Band ==
The Woodlands High School Band was honored by the John Philip Sousa Foundation with the Sudler Flag of Honor in 2003 in recognition for excellence in a concert setting. The band was honored again by the John Philip Sousa Foundation in 2009 and 2018 with the Sudler Shield in recognition for excellence in marching band. This makes The Woodlands High School one of only a handful of high schools internationally to have received both the Sudler Flag and the Sudler Shield. In 2003 and 2012, The Woodlands High School's Wind Ensemble was invited to perform at The Midwest Clinic. In 2012, the Wind Ensemble was named a National Winner in The Foundation for Music Education's National Wind Band Honors Project. Members of The Woodlands High School Band have placed in the TMEA All-State Bands and Orchestras every year since the school has opened.

In 2006, the band received first place in the class AAA Bands of America Grand National Championships semi-finals. In 2013, the band was named the Bands of America Grand National Champion, scoring a 96.8 and winning caption awards for Outstanding Music Performance and Outstanding General Effect. The band has been a BOA Grand National finalist 13 times, the most out of any band from Texas. The band has been a UIL Marching Band state finalist 13 times between 2002 and 2026.

The marching band was invited to perform at the 2025 Rose Parade in Pasadena, CA, but declined.

== Extracurricular activities ==
The school offers more than 80 different clubs and organizations. Students have the opportunity to participate in band, choir, speech, debate, drama, drill team, orchestra, cheerleading, and UIL academic activities.

In 2024, The Woodlands High School Winter Guard were the Winter Guard International Scholastic World Class champions.

The Woodlands High School Theatre Department has succeeded in advancing to the state finals of the UIL one-act play contest six times, most recently in 2011, and won the state title in 2000. The theatre department has also been invited to perform on the main stage of the International Thespian Festival four times. The department performed at Texas Thespian State Festival and International State Festival for the first time in December 2015 and June 2016 respectively with the musical, The 25th Annual Putnam County Spelling Bee. In 2003, the theatre department performed at the Edinburgh Festival Fringe.

The Woodlands High School Highsteppers were Grand National Champions in 2005.

== Feeder patterns ==
Elementary schools (K-4) that feed into The Woodlands High School include:

- Buckalew
- Bush
- Galatas
- Glen Loch
- Powell (excluding Harper's Landing).

Combined elementary and intermediate schools (K-6) include Deretchin and Coulson Tough.

Intermediate schools (5-6) include Mitchell and Wilkerson (Glen Loch ES zoning only).

McCullough Junior High School is the sole feeder junior high school (7-8) into The Woodlands High School.

== Incidents ==
=== February 2004 bomb threat ===
On February 25, 2004, The Woodlands High School and its McCullough campus were among several Conroe Independent School District secondary schools evacuated following a bomb threat. The threat was communicated through telephone calls to 911 dispatchers and a local radio station, with the caller claiming that a bomb had been planted at a Conroe school. Thousands of students, teachers, and staff members across the affected campuses were evacuated while Conroe ISD police and Montgomery County Sheriff's Office deputies searched the buildings. The evacuations and searches took approximately 30 minutes. All buildings were cleared, and students and staff returned to class. As of March 3, authorities had made no arrests in connection with the threats.

=== April 2007 threatening graffiti and written threats ===
In April 2007, The Woodlands High School investigated a series of written threats and graffiti referring to possible shootings at the school. The first message was discovered on April 2 in a girls' restroom and warned of a shooting at the school. Additional graffiti and threatening messages appeared in school restrooms on April 16 and 17, while rumors of further threats circulated among students. School officials and law enforcement investigated the messages, with the district's police department, canine unit, Bureau of Alcohol, Tobacco, Firearms and Explosives, and Montgomery County Sheriff's Office notified of the incidents.

On April 18, a student admitted writing a note threatening a school shooting and placing it in a locker, explaining that it had been fabricated in an attempt to avoid attending school on April 20. School officials subsequently stated that the investigated threats were not considered credible and appeared to have originated from the initial graffiti and rumors circulating around campus.

=== May 2018 campus lockdown ===
On May 17, 2018, The Woodlands High School was placed on lockdown after a report of a person carrying what appeared to be a firearm near the campus. Conroe ISD police and Montgomery County Sheriff's Office deputies responded to the school. Following an investigation, authorities determined that the individual, who was a student, was carrying a tree branch rather than a firearm. The lockdown lasted less than an hour, and the student was allowed to return to class. The incident occurred one day before the Santa Fe High School shooting in nearby Santa Fe, Texas, which heightened concerns about school safety throughout the region.

=== October 2022 social media bomb threat ===
In late October 2022, a bomb threat directed at The Woodlands High School circulated on social media. Authorities linked a student to the threat, according to school principal Ted Landry, who informed parents that the student faced disciplinary action. Conroe ISD police visited the student's home as part of the threat assessment process. Landry stated that the matter would be addressed under the district's Student Code of Conduct and applicable state law. School administrators also investigated additional rumors circulating among students concerning campus safety.

=== November 2026 campus lockdown ===
On November 4, 2026, The Woodlands High School was placed on lockdown following a telephone threat against the campus. The Montgomery County Sheriff's Office said deputies responded at approximately 12:15 p.m. after receiving a report that an individual in the school parking lot intended to attack the campus using firearms and pipe bombs. Conroe ISD police and other law enforcement agencies responded, and the Bureau of Alcohol, Tobacco, Firearms and Explosives also assisted in the investigation. Law enforcement secured and searched the campus, while students and staff were transported by bus to a designated reunification location for parent pickup.

Authorities reported that all students and staff were safe. During the response, an altered social media post circulated, and a local daycare mistakenly informed parents that an active shooter had been confirmed at the school. A precautionary lockdown at the Lone Star College-System Office in The Woodlands was also lifted after authorities determined that the college campus was not threatened. Conroe ISD police announced additional patrols at the high school for November 5th. The lockdown was subsequently lifted, although the investigation remained ongoing. Authorities had not publicly identified a suspect as of November 5, 2026.

== Notable alumni ==
- Kevin Abstract, rapper and director, Brockhampton
- Danny Amendola, former NFL player
- Scott Atchison, former MLB player
- Chris Beard, college basketball coach
- Lance Blanks, former NBA player
- Bronson Burgoon, professional golfer
- Patrick Carr, NFL player who is currently a free agent, graduated in 2015.
- Matt Champion, rapper, Brockhampton
- Kassidy Cook, Olympian, diver
- Kyle Drabek, former MLB player, Toronto Blue Jays
- Tiffany Grant, anime voice actress
- Paul Goldschmidt, MLB player, Arizona Diamondbacks
- Jack Ingram, country singer
- Larry Izzo, former NFL player
- Daniel Lasco, NFL player, New Orleans Saints
- Stacy Lewis, LPGA Tour golfer, 2013 Women's British Open champion
- Jeff Maggert, PGA Tour golfer
- Nick Mitchell, former professional wrestler known for his time in WWE
- Rusty Pierce, former MLS player
- Jameson Taillon, MLB player, Chicago Cubs
- Ameer Vann, rapper, formerly of Brockhampton
- Antoine Winfield Jr., NFL player, Tampa Bay Buccaneers
- Merlyn Wood, rapper, Brockhampton
- Drew Romo, MLB player, Colorado Rockies
- Peter McPoland, singer-songwriter
- Ethan Bonner, NFL player, Miami Dolphins
