= 1978 All-Pacific-10 Conference football team =

1978 Pacific-10 Conference football standings
	Conf.					Overall
Team	W		L		T	W		L		T
No. 2 USC $	6	–	1	–	0	12	–	1	–	0
No. 14 UCLA	6	–	2	–	0	8	–	3	–	1
Washington	6	–	2	–	0	7	–	4	–	0
Arizona State	4	–	3	–	0	9	–	3	–	0
No. 17 Stanford	4	–	3	–	0	8	–	4	–	0
California	3	–	4	–	0	6	–	5	–	0
Arizona	3	–	4	–	0	5	–	6	–	0
Oregon	2	–	5	–	0	2	–	9	–	0
Oregon State	2	–	6	–	0	3	–	7	–	1
Washington State	1	–	7	–	0	3	–	7	–	1
$ – Conference champion; Rankings from AP Poll

The 1978 All-Pacific-10 Conference football team consists of American football players chosen by various organizations for All-Pacific-10 Conference teams for the 1978 NCAA Division I-A football season.

== Offensive selections ==
=== Quarterback ===
- Jack Thompson, Washington State (Coaches-1)
- Steve Dils, Stanford (Coaches-2)

=== Running backs ===
- Theotis Brown, UCLA (Coaches-1)
- Darrin Nelson, Stanford (Coaches-1)
- Charles White, USC (Coaches-1)
- Joe Steele, Washington (Coaches-2)
- Larry Heater, Arizona (Coaches-2)
- Hubie Oliver, Arizona (Coaches-2)

=== Wide receivers ===
- Ken Margerum, Stanford (Coaches-1)
- Kevin Williams, USC (Coaches-1)
- Spider Gaines, Washington (Coaches-2)
- Chris DeFrance, Arizona State (Coaches-2)

=== Tight end ===
- Ron Beyer, Arizona (Coaches-1)
- James Hunter, USC (Coaches-2)

=== Tackles ===
- Jeff Toews, Washington (Coaches-1)
- Anthony Muñoz, USC (Coaches-1)
- Max Montoya, UCLA (Coaches-2)
- Gene Engle, Stanford (Coaches-2)

=== Guards ===
- Pat Howell, USC (Coaches-1)
- Brad Budde, USC (Coaches-1)
- Duke Leffler, California (Coaches-2)
- Jim Stephens, Stanford (Coaches-2)

=== Center ===
- Mark Chandless, Washington State (Coaches-1)
- John Macaulay, Stanford (Coaches-2)

== Defensive selections ==
=== Linemen ===
- Rich Dimler, USC (Coaches-1)
- Al Harris, Arizona State (Coaches-1)
- Doug Martin, Washington (Coaches-1)
- Manu Tuiasosopo, UCLA (Coaches-1) [nose guard]
- Cleveland Crosby, Arizona (Coaches-2)
- Vince Goldsmith, Oregon (Coaches-2)
- George Yarno, Washington State (Coaches-2)
- Jerry Wilkinson, Oregon State (Coaches-2)

=== Linebackers ===
- Gordy Ceresino, Stanford (Coaches-1)
- Michael Jackson, Washington (Coaches-1)
- Dennis Johnson, USC (Coaches-1)
- Jerry Robinson, UCLA (Coaches-1)
- Kent Peyton, Oregon State (Coaches-2)
- Bruce Beekley, Oregon (Coaches-2)
- Corky Ingraham, Arizona (Coaches-2)
- Antowaine Richardson, Washington (Coaches-2)

=== Defensive backs ===
- Kim Anderson, Arizona State (Coaches-1)
- Kenny Easley, UCLA (Coaches-1)
- Nesby Glasgow, Washington (Coaches-1)
- Kyle Heinrich, Washington (Coaches-1)
- Tim Smith, Oregon State (Coaches-2)
- Dennis Smith, USC (Coaches-2)
- Ronnie Lott, USC (Coaches-2)
- Robby Chapman, Stanford (Coaches-2)

== Special teams ==
=== Placekicker ===
- Peter Boermeester, UCLA (Coaches-1)
- Kieron Walford, Oregon State (Coaches-2)

=== Punter ===
- Marty King, USC (Coaches-1)
- Dan Melville, California (Coaches-2)

== Key ==
Coaches = Pacific-10 football coaches

== See also ==
- 1978 College Football All-America Team
