= 1978–79 NCAA football bowl games =

Series of post-season NCAA football games

- Season: 1978
- Number of bowls: 15
- Bowl games: December 16, 1978 – January 1, 1979
- National Championship: 1979 Sugar Bowl
- Location of Championship: Louisiana Superdome, New Orleans, Louisiana
- Champions: Alabama
Bowl record by conference
Conference	Bowls	Record	Final AP poll

The 1978–79 NCAA football bowl games were a series of post-season games played in December 1978 and January 1979 to end the 1978 NCAA Division I-A football season. A total of 15 team-competitive games were played. The post-season began with the Garden State Bowl on December 16, 1978, and concluded on January 1, 1979, with the Orange Bowl.

== Schedule ==
Date	Game	Site	TV	Teams	Results
Dec. 16	Garden State Bowl	Giants Stadium; East Rutherford, New Jersey	Mizlou	Arizona State (8–3); Rutgers (9–2)	Arizona State 34; Rutgers 18
Dec. 16	Independence Bowl	State Fair Stadium; Shreveport, Louisiana	WITN-TV	East Carolina (8–3); Louisiana Tech (6–4)	East Carolina 35; Louisiana Tech 13
Dec. 20	Hall of Fame Classic	Legion Field; Birmingham, Alabama	Mizlou	Texas A&M (7–4); No. 19 Iowa State (8–3)	Texas A&M 28; Iowa State 12
Dec. 22	Holiday Bowl	Jack Murphy Stadium; San Diego, California	Mizlou	Navy (8–3); BYU (9–3)	Navy 23; BYU 16
Dec. 23	Sun Bowl	Sun Bowl; El Paso, Texas	CBS	No. 14 Texas (8–3); No. 13 Maryland (9–2)	Texas 42; Maryland 0
Dec. 23	Liberty Bowl	Liberty Bowl Memorial Stadium; Memphis, Tennessee	ABC	No. 18 Missouri (7–4); LSU (8–3)	Missouri 20; LSU 15
Dec. 23	Tangerine Bowl	Orlando Stadium; Orlando, Florida	Mizlou	NC State (8–3); No. 16 Pittsburgh (8–3)	NC State 30; Pittsburgh 17
Dec. 25	Peach Bowl	Fulton County Stadium; Atlanta, Georgia	CBS	No. 17 Purdue (8–2–1); Georgia Tech (7–4)	Purdue 41; Georgia Tech 21
Dec. 25	Fiesta Bowl	Sun Devil Stadium; Tempe, Arizona	NBC	No. 8 Arkansas (9–2); No. 15 UCLA (8–3)	Arkansas 10; UCLA 10
Dec. 29	Gator Bowl	Gator Bowl Stadium; Jacksonville, Florida	ABC	No. 7 Clemson (10–1); No. 20 Ohio State (7–3–1)	Clemson 17; Ohio State 15
Dec. 31	Astro-Bluebonnet Bowl	Astrodome; Houston, Texas	Mizlou	Stanford (7–4); No. 11 Georgia (9–1–1)	Stanford 25; Georgia 22
Jan. 1	Cotton Bowl Classic	Cotton Bowl; Dallas, Texas	CBS	No. 10 Notre Dame (8–3); No. 9 Houston (9–2)	Notre Dame 35; Houston 34
Jan. 1	Sugar Bowl	Louisiana Superdome; New Orleans, Louisiana	ABC	No. 2 Alabama (10–1); No. 1 Penn State (11–0)	Alabama 14; Penn State 7
Jan. 1	Rose Bowl	Rose Bowl; Pasadena, California	NBC	No. 3 USC (11–1); No. 5 Michigan (10–1)	USC 17; Michigan 10
Jan. 1	Orange Bowl	Miami Orange Bowl; Miami, Florida	NBC	No. 4 Oklahoma (10–1); No. 6 Nebraska (9–2)	Oklahoma 31; Nebraska 24

Rankings from AP Poll
