= 1984 Cleveland Browns season =

NFL team season

- Owner: Art Modell
- Head coach: Sam Rutigliano (fired October 22nd; 1-7 record); Marty Schottenheimer (interim; 4–4 record)
- Home stadium: Cleveland Municipal Stadium

Results
- Record: 5–11
- Division place: 3rd AFC Central
- Playoffs: Did not qualify
- Pro Bowlers: TE Ozzie Newsome

Uniform

The 1984 Cleveland Browns season was the team's 35th season with the National Football League. At the season's mid-way point, head coach Sam Rutigliano was fired after starting 1–7. He was replaced by defensive coordinator Marty Schottenheimer, who went 4–4 to finish the season. Schottenheimer would coach the Browns until 1988, guiding the Browns to a .620 winning percentage in his tenure with the team.

== Personnel ==
=== Staff ===
1984 Cleveland Browns staff
| Front office: President and Owner – Art Modell; Assistant to the President – Ernie Accorsi; Head coaches: Head coach – Sam Rutigliano; Offensive coaches: Offensive coordinator – Joe Scannella; Running backs – Keith Rowen; Receivers – Joe Daniels; Offensive line – Howard Mudd | Defensive coaches: Defensive coordinator – Marty Schottenheimer; Defensive line – Tom Pratt; Linebackers – Dave Adolph; Special assistant – Darvin Wallis; Special teams coaches: Special teams – John Petercuskie; Strength and conditioning: Strength and Conditioning – Dave Redding |

=== Roster ===
1984 Cleveland Browns roster
| Quarterbacks (QB): 10 Tom Flick; 16 Paul McDonald; 7 Terry Nugent; Running backs (RB): 44 Earnest Byner; 38 Johnny Davis; 30 Boyce Green; 43 Mike Pruitt; Wide receivers (WR): 80 Willis Adams; 86 Brian Brennan; 85 Bruce Davis; 83 Ricky Feacher; 89 Dwight Walker; 83 Glen Young; Tight ends (TE): 81 Harry Holt; 88 Darryl Lewis; 82 Ozzie Newsome | Offensive linemen (OL): 61 Mike Baab C; 64 Joe DeLamielleure G; 54 Tom DeLeone C; 73 Doug Dieken T; 74 Paul Farren T/G; 68 Robert Jackson G; 62 George Lilja T/G; 71 Robert Sikora T; Defensive linemen (DL): 99 Keith Baldwin DE; 96 Reggie Camp DE; 94 Elvis Franks DE; 79 Bob Golic NT; 78 Carl Hairston DE; 72 Dave Puzzuoli NT | Linebackers (LB): 53 Stuart Anderson ILB; 56 Chip Banks OLB; 50 Tom Cousineau ILB; 51 Eddie Johnson ILB; 59 David Marshall ILB; 57 Clay Matthews OLB; 58 Scott Nicolas ILB; 55 Curtis Weathers OLB; Defensive backs (DB): 24 Greg Best SS; 47 Larry Braziel CB; 49 Clinton Burrell SS; 29 Hanford Dixon CB; 27 Al Gross SS; 31 Frank Minnifield CB; 40 Rod Perry CB; 37 Chris Rockins FS; 20 Don Rogers FS; Special teams (ST): 9 Matt Bahr K; 15 Steve Cox P/K | Reserve: 52 Dick Ambrose LB (IR); 88 Rickey Bolden TE (IR); 75 Bill Contz T (IR); 63 Cody Risien T (IR); 87 Tim Stracka TE (IR); 25 Charles White RB (IR); 21 Mike Whitwell S (IR); Rookies in italics |

== Schedule ==
| Week | Date | Opponent | Result | Record | Venue | Attendance |
|---|---|---|---|---|---|---|
| 1 | September 3 | at Seattle Seahawks | **L** 0–33 | 0–1 | Kingdome | 59,540 |
| 2 | September 9 | at Los Angeles Rams | **L** 17–20 | 0–2 | Anaheim Stadium | 43,043 |
| 3 | September 16 | Denver Broncos | **L** 14–24 | 0–3 | Cleveland Municipal Stadium | 61,980 |
| 4 | September 23 | **Pittsburgh Steelers** | **W** 20–10 | 1–3 | Cleveland Municipal Stadium | 77,312 |
| 5 | September 30 | at Kansas City Chiefs | **L** 6–10 | 1–4 | Arrowhead Stadium | 40,785 |
| 6 | October 7 | New England Patriots | **L** 16–17 | 1–5 | Cleveland Municipal Stadium | 53,036 |
| 7 | October 14 | New York Jets | **L** 20–24 | 1–6 | Cleveland Municipal Stadium | 55,673 |
| 8 | October 21 | at **Cincinnati Bengals** | **L** 9–12 | 1–7 | Riverfront Stadium | 50,667 |
| 9 | October 28 | New Orleans Saints | **L** 14–16 | 1–8 | Cleveland Municipal Stadium | 52,489 |
| 10 | November 4 | at Buffalo Bills | **W** 13–10 | 2–8 | Rich Stadium | 33,343 |
| 11 | November 11 | San Francisco 49ers | **L** 7–41 | 2–9 | Cleveland Municipal Stadium | 60,092 |
| 12 | November 18 | at Atlanta Falcons | **W** 23–7 | 3–9 | Atlanta–Fulton County Stadium | 28,280 |
| 13 | November 25 | **Houston Oilers** | **W** 27–10 | 4–9 | Cleveland Municipal Stadium | 46,077 |
| 14 | December 2 | **Cincinnati Bengals** | **L** 17–20 | 4–10 | Cleveland Municipal Stadium | 51,774 |
| 15 | December 9 | at **Pittsburgh Steelers** | **L** 20–23 | 4–11 | Three Rivers Stadium | 55,825 |
| 16 | December 16 | at **Houston Oilers** | **W** 27–20 | 5–11 | Houston Astrodome | 33,676 |
Note: Intra-division opponents are in **bold** text.

=== Standings ===
AFC Central
| | W | L | T | PCT | DIV | CONF | PF | PA | STK |
|---|---|---|---|---|---|---|---|---|---|
| ^{(3)} Pittsburgh Steelers | 9 | 7 | 0 | .563 | 3–3 | 6–6 | 387 | 310 | W2 |
| Cincinnati Bengals | 8 | 8 | 0 | .500 | 5–1 | 6–6 | 339 | 339 | W4 |
| Cleveland Browns | 5 | 11 | 0 | .313 | 3–3 | 4–8 | 250 | 297 | W1 |
| Houston Oilers | 3 | 13 | 0 | .188 | 1–5 | 3–9 | 240 | 437 | L2 |

== Game summaries ==
=== Week 11 (Sunday, November 11, 1984): vs. San Francisco 49ers ===
Week 11: San Francisco 49ers at Cleveland Browns

| Quarter | 1 | 2 | 3 | 4 | Total |
|---|---|---|---|---|---|
| 49ers (10–1) | 6 | 7 | 14 | 14 | 41 |
| Browns (2–9) | 0 | 0 | 0 | 7 | 7 |

at Cleveland Municipal Stadium • Cleveland, Ohio

- Date: November 11, 1984
- Game time: 1:00 p.m. EST
- Game weather: 45 °F (7 °C); wind 15 miles per hour (24 km/h; 13 kn)
- Game attendance: 60,092
- Referee: Fred Silva
- TV announcers (CBS): Tom Brookshier (play-by-play) and Wayne Walker (color commentator)

| Team | Category | Player | Statistics |
|---|---|---|---|
| SF | Passing | Joe Montana | 24/30, 263 YDS, 2 TDs, 1 INT |
| SF | Rushing | Wendell Tyler | 17 CAR, 87 YDS |
| SF | Receiving | Freddie Solomon | 5 REC, 105 YDS, 2 TDs |
| CLE | Passing | Paul McDonald | 13/33, 220 YDS, 1 TD, 1 INT |
| CLE | Rushing | Boyce Green | 13 CAR, 38 YDS |
| CLE | Receiving | Bruce Davis | 4 REC, 64 YDS, 1 TD |

Scoring summary

| Quarter | Time | Drive | | | Team | Scoring information | Score | |
| Quarter | Time | Plays | Yards | TOP | Team | Scoring information | SF | CLE |
|---|---|---|---|---|---|---|---|---|
| 1 | 13:26 | | | | 49ers | 47-yard field goal by Wersching | 3 | 0 |
| 1 | 7:16 | | | | 49ers | 26-yard field goal by Wersching | 6 | 0 |
| 2 | 10:56 | | | | 49ers | Craig 20-yard touchdown run, Wersching kick good | 13 | 0 |
| 3 | 4:34 | | | | 49ers | Craig 2-yard touchdown run, Wersching kick good | 20 | 0 |
| 3 | 0:00 | | | | 49ers | Solomon 60-yard touchdown reception from Montana, Wersching kick good | 27 | 0 |
| 4 | 10:33 | | | | 49ers | Solomon 2-yard touchdown reception from Montana, Wersching kick good | 34 | 0 |
| 4 | 6:56 | | | | 49ers | Ring 5-yard touchdown run, Wersching kick good | 41 | 0 |
| 4 | 3:38 | | | | Browns | Davis 18-yard touchdown reception from McDonald, Bahr kick good | 41 | 7 |
| "TOP" = time of possession. For other American football terms, see Glossary of American football. | | | | | | | 41 | 7 |

- Point spread: 49ers by 6
- Over/under: 35.0 (over)
- Time of game:

| 49ers | Game statistics | Browns |
|---|---|---|
| 23 | First downs | 10 |
| 39–213 | Rushes–yards | 20–43 |
| 263 | Passing yards | 220 |
| 24–30–1 | Passes | 13–33–1 |
| 1–8 | Sacked–yards | 2–12 |
| 255 | Net passing yards | 208 |
| 468 | Total yards | 251 |
| 90 | Return yards | 125 |
| 2–38.5 | Punts | 6–37.0 |
| 1–1 | Fumbles–lost | 5–3 |
| 7–45 | Penalties–yards | 5–32 |
| 35:27 | Time of Possession | 24:33 |

=== Week 12: at Atlanta ===
Week 12: Cleveland Browns at Atlanta Falcons – Game summary

| Quarter | 1 | 2 | 3 | 4 | Total |
|---|---|---|---|---|---|
| Browns | 10 | 3 | 0 | 10 | 23 |
| Falcons | 7 | 0 | 0 | 0 | 7 |

at Atlanta–Fulton County Stadium, Atlanta

- Date: November 18
- Game time: 1:00 p.m. EST
- Game weather: 55 °F (13 °C), relative humidity 50%, round (wind) 12 mph (19 km/h)
- Game attendance: 28,280
- Referee: Pat Haggerty
- TV announcers (NBC): Gary Gerould (play–by–play) and Reggie Rucker (color commentator)

Game information

First quarter

- ATL (4:13) – Bailey 20 yard pass from Bartkowski (Luckhurst kick)
  Falcons 7, Browns 0
- CLE (11:35) – Davis 33 yard pass from McDonald (Bahr kick)
  Browns 7, Falcons 7
- CLE (14:26) – Bahr 27 yard field goal
  Browns 10, Falcons 7

Second quarter

- CLE (6:51) – Bahr 46 yard field goal
  Browns 13, Falcons 7

Third quarter

- No scoring plays

Fourth quarter

- CLE (1:49) – Newsome 16 yard pass from McDonald (Bahr kick)
  Browns 20, Falcons 7
- CLE (9:26) – Bahr 20 yard field goal
  Browns 23, Falcons 7

Top passers

- CLE – Paul McDonald 13/23, 205 yds, 2 TD, 1 INT
- ATL – Steve Bartkowski 19/28, 191 yds, 1 TD, 1 INT

Top rushers

- CLE – Boyce Green 30 carr, 121 yds
- ATL – Gerald Riggs 21 carr, 71 yds

Top receivers

- CLE – Ozzie Newsome 5 rec, 97 yds, 1 TD
- ATL – Gerald Riggs 6 rec, 41 yds

Turnovers

- CLE – 2
- ATL – 4

=== Week 13 at Houston ===
Paul McDonald threw three touchdown passes, two to Brian Brennan and the Browns defense stifled the Houston offense. The Browns are 3-2 under Marty Schotteheimer and the 27 points were the most their offense has scored this season. "The Browns is a very active team, using all their assets", said Oilers' coach Hugh Campbell.
