= 1978 Fiesta Bowl =

American college football game

- 8th Fiesta Bowl
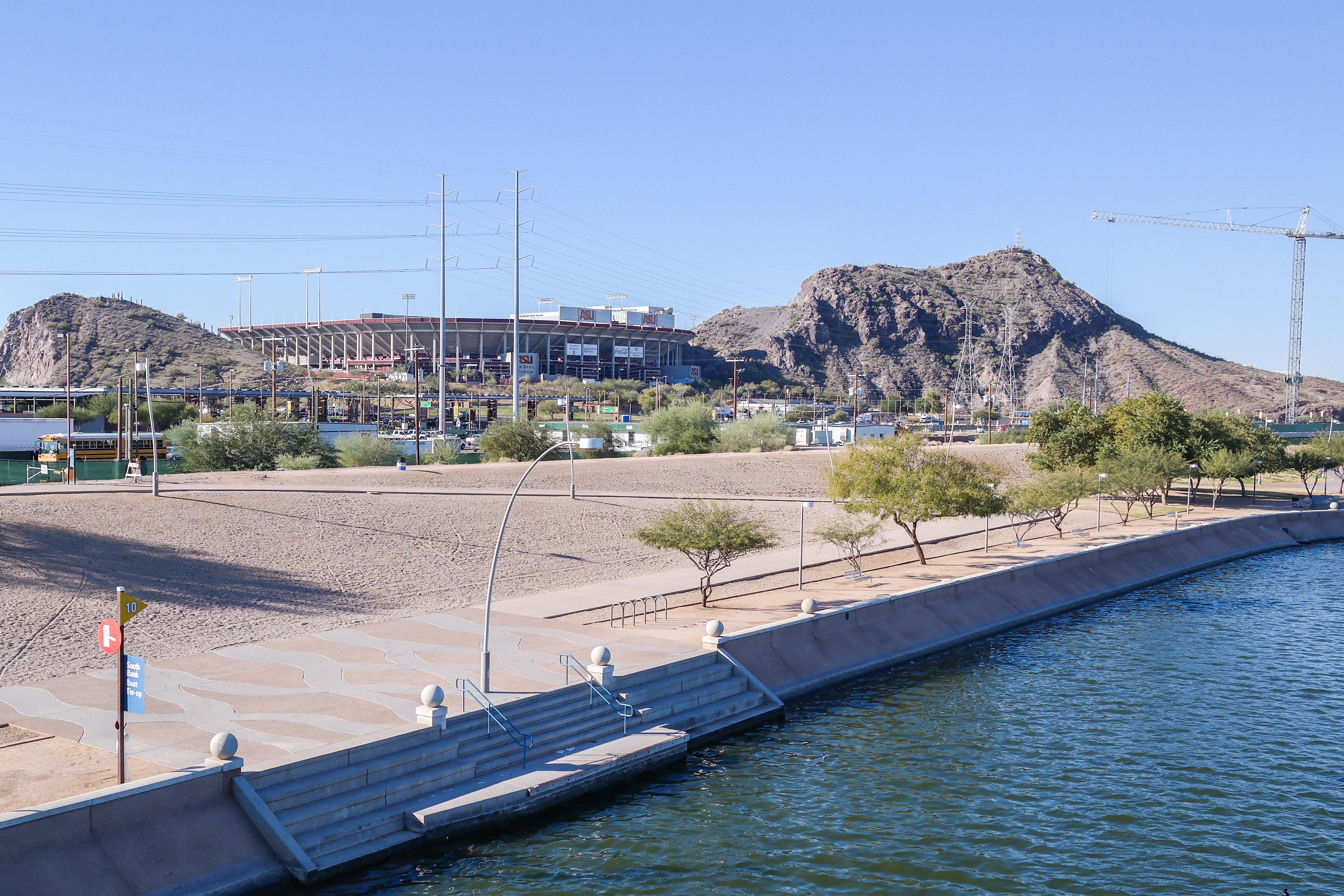
- Sun Devil Stadium in Tempe, Arizona, hosted the Fiesta Bowl.
| Arkansas Razorbacks | UCLA Bruins |
| (9–2) | (8–3) |
| SWC | Pac-10 |
| 10 | 10 |
| Head coach: Lou Holtz | Head coach: Terry Donahue |
| AP / Coaches; 8 / 10 | AP / Coaches; 15 / 16 |
| | 1 | 2 | 3 | 4 | Total |
|---|---|---|---|---|---|
| Arkansas | 0 | 10 | 0 | 0 | 10 |
| UCLA | 0 | 0 | 3 | 7 | 10 |
- Date: December 25, 1978
- Season: 1978
- Stadium: Sun Devil Stadium
- Location: Tempe, Arizona
- MVP: James Owens (UCLA RB); Jimmy Walker (Arkansas DT)
- Favorite: Arkansas by 7 points
- Referee: Jimmy Harper (SEC)
- Attendance: 55,227
- Payout: US$342,562.70

United States TV coverage
- Network: NBC
- Announcers: Curt Gowdy, John Brodie, and Mike Haffner

The 1978 Fiesta Bowl was the eighth edition of the college football bowl game, played at Sun Devil Stadium in Tempe, Arizona on Monday, December 25. Part of the 1978–79 bowl game season, it matched the eighth-ranked Arkansas Razorbacks of the Southwest Conference (SWC), and the #15 UCLA Bruins from the Pacific-10 Conference (Pac-10). The game ended in a 10–10 tie before 55,227 spectators.

This was the third of four consecutive Fiesta Bowls played on Christmas Day, and was the first without a team from the Western Athletic Conference (WAC), whose champion played in the new Holiday Bowl in San Diego.

== Teams ==
This was the first meeting between the two programs.

=== Arkansas ===
With a win over Texas A&M, Arkansas clinched a Fiesta Bowl berth. Entering the game, Arkansas had come off a 49–7 win over Texas Tech, and was 10–2 overall. The Razorbacks began the season at #2 in the AP poll, but consecutive losses at Texas and at Houston dropped the Razorbacks from SWC title contention. Ron Calcagni led the team at quarterback, while Ben Cowins was the leading rusher for the Hogs. Bruins head coach Terry Donahue said before the game that the UCLA defense would try to slow down an Arkansas rushing attack that "couldn't be stopped."

=== UCLA ===
The Bruins had been upset at Kansas in September, then won six straight to improve to 8–1. They dropped their final two games, at Oregon State, and to rival USC.

== Game summary ==
Now televised by NBC, the game kicked off on Christmas Day shortly after 1:30 p.m. MST. The Peach Bowl was played earlier in the day on CBS. The NBC telecast was most noted for sideline reporter Mike Haffner inadvertently capturing on his live microphone a two-word expletive uttered by Terry Donahue who was voicing his disapproval over a Bruins interception being nullified due to a penalty. Ironically Haffner and Donohue were roommates at UCLA.

After a scoreless first quarter, Jim Howard sacked UCLA quarterback Steve Bukich, who fumbled, and Arkansas recovered at the UCLA 37. Roland Sales punched it in from four yards out to give the Hogs a 7–0 advantage. The Razorbacks added a field goal from Ish Ordonez, stretching the lead to ten points at halftime.

UCLA took the second half kickoff and drove it for a field goal from Peter Boermaester. Down 10–3, UCLA was set to field a Razorback punt in the fourth quarter. An interference penalty added yardage, giving the Bruins the football at midfield. Severne Reece caught a Bukich pass at the Arkansas 14, and Bukich ran it in on the following play. The Bruins opted not to attempt a two-point conversion, made the kick, and the game was tied at 10–10 with 8:32 remaining. Neither team could get the ball past midfield again, and the tie stood.

=== Scoring ===
Scoring summary

| Quarter | Time | Drive | | | Team | Scoring information | Score | |
| Quarter | Time | Plays | Yards | TOP | Team | Scoring information | ARK | UCLA |
|---|---|---|---|---|---|---|---|---|
| 2 | | | 37 | 10 | ARK | Roland Sales 4-yard touchdown run, Ish Ordonez kick good | 7 | 0 |
| 2 | | | 50 | 8 | ARK | 37-yard field goal by Ish Ordonez | 10 | 0 |
| 3 | 7:19 | | 56 | 15 | UCLA | 4-yard field goal by Peter Boermaester | 10 | 3 |
| 4 | 8:32 | | 51 | 5 | UCLA | Steve Bukich 15-yard touchdown run, Peter Boermaester kick good | 10 | 10 |
| "TOP" = time of possession. For other American football terms, see Glossary of American football. | | | | | | | 10 | 10 |

== Statistics ==
| Statistics | Arkansas | UCLA |
|---|---|---|
| First downs | 19 | 14 |
| Yards rushing | 51–200 | 55–255 |
| Yards passing | 78 | 61 |
| Passing | 13–24–2 | 4–11–2 |
| Return yards | 72 | 35 |
| Total Offense | 75–278 | 66–316 |
| Punts–Average | 8–37 | 6–41 |
| Fumbles–Lost | 2–0 | 2–1 |
| Turnovers | 2 | 3 |
| Penalties–Yards | 4–55 | 7–67 |
