= Paul McDonald (American football) =

American football player (born 1958)

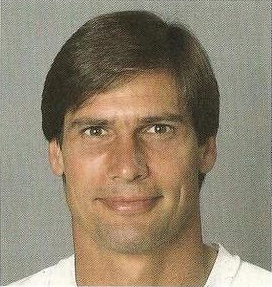
- McDonald in 1985

No. 16, 14
- Position: Quarterback

Personal information
- Born: February 23, 1958 (age 68); Montebello, California, U.S.
- Listed height: 6 ft 2 in (1.88 m)
- Listed weight: 184 lb (83 kg)

Career information
- High school: Bishop Amat Memorial (La Puente, California)
- College: USC
- NFL draft: 1980: 4th round, 109th overall pick

Career history
- Cleveland Browns (1980–1985); Seattle Seahawks (1986)*; Dallas Cowboys (1986–1987)
- * Offseason or practice squad member only

Awards and highlights
- National champion (1978); Second-team All-American (1979); All-Pac-10 (1979); Second-team All-Pac-10 (1978); NCAA Silver Anniversary Award (2005)

Career NFL statistics
- Passing attempts: 767
- Passing completions: 411
- Completion percentage: 53.6%
- TD–INT: 24–37
- Passing yards: 5,269
- Passer rating: 65.7
- Stats at Pro Football Reference

Paul Brian McDonald (born February 23, 1958) is an American former professional football player who was a quarterback in the National Football League (NFL) for the Cleveland Browns and Dallas Cowboys. He played college football for the USC Trojans, earning second-team All-American honors in 1979.

== Early life ==
McDonald attended Bishop Amat Memorial High School. He received All-state honors in football as a senior. He accepted a football scholarship from the University of Southern California. As a true freshman, he was the third-string quarterback behind Vince Evans and Rob Hertel. As a sophomore, he was promoted to backup quarterback behind Hertel after Evans graduated.

As a junior, he was named the starter at quarterback after Hertel graduated. He was part of a backfield that included running back Charles White and Lynn Cain, which helped the team capture a share of the national championship with the University of Alabama in the 1978 season. He passed for 1,690 yards (led the Pac-10), 19 touchdowns (tied school record), 7 interceptions and led the NCAA in pass efficiency with a rating of 152.8. His only loss in his two years as a starter was against Arizona State University in 1978. Injuries to the Trojans' top two centers led to several fumbled snaps that opened the door for Sun Devil and future NFL quarterback Mark Malone to win 20–7.

He was a senior in 1979, and he played in a backfield that included future Heisman Trophy winners White and Marcus Allen. He posted 2,223 passing yards, 18 touchdowns and 6 interceptions. He led the team to a 17–16 win against Ohio State University, after it entered the 1980 Rose Bowl as the number one ranked team in the nation. He finished sixth in the 1979 Heisman Trophy voting.

He was known for his poise and as a winner, finishing his college career with a 22-1-1 record, holding the NCAA mark for the lowest interception percentage in a career at 2.3% (13 interceptions in 561 attempts) and the Pac-10 record of 143 straight passes without an interception. In 2005, he received the NCAA Silver Anniversary Award.

== Professional career ==
=== Cleveland Browns ===
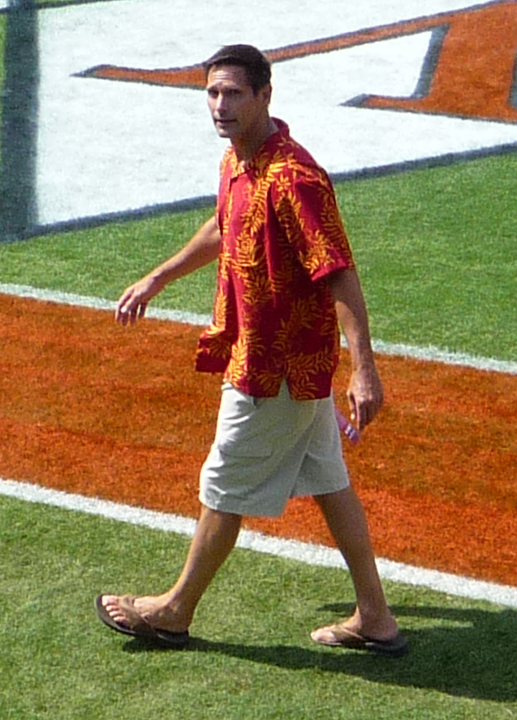
McDonald in 2008

McDonald was selected by the Cleveland Browns in the fourth round (109th overall) of the 1980 NFL draft. He was a backup behind quarterback Brian Sipe in his first 4 seasons.

In 1982, he replaced Sipe (who was suffering from a sore throwing arm) in the last three games of the strike-shortened season, posting a 2–1 record and helping the team make the playoffs that had been expanded to 16 teams. He started in the first round of the playoffs, which resulted in a 27–10 loss against the Oakland Raiders, after throwing for 281 yards and 1 touchdown with no interceptions. Sipe won back the starting job the next season.

In 1983, Sipe regained his starting job and McDonald returned to his backup role.

In 1984, Sipe signed with the New Jersey Generals of the United States Football League and the Browns gave the starting job to McDonald, who decided to stay in the NFL, despite also receiving offers to move. Defensive coordinator Marty Schottenheimer took over the Browns head coaching job halfway through the season. McDonald had a 5–11 record after enduring 53 sacks and registering 3,472 passing yards, 14 touchdowns and 23 interceptions. Against the New England Patriots, he had a career-high 320 passing yards on 23 out of 37 attempts (62.2%) and one touchdown. Against the New Orleans Saints, he tallied a career-high 75% completion percentage (18 out of 24). Against the Houston Oilers, he completed 13 straight passes.

In 1985, the team traded for veteran Gary Danielson and selected Bernie Kosar in the first round of the NFL supplemental draft, which dropped McDonald to third-string quarterback. In 1986, the team traded for Mike Pagel, who passed McDonald on the depth chart, causing him to be waived on June 26. He left the Browns after passing for 5,269 yards, 24 touchdowns and 37 interceptions.

=== Seattle Seahawks ===
On July 16, 1986, he signed as a free agent with the Seattle Seahawks. On August 26, he was released after the team opted to keep only two quarterbacks.

=== Dallas Cowboys ===
On November 4, 1986, he was signed by the Dallas Cowboys as a free agent to be the third-string quarterback, after starter Danny White was lost for the season with a broken right wrist he suffered during the 14–17 loss against the New York Giants. He reunited with pass offense coordinator Paul Hackett, who was one of his coaches with the Trojans and the Browns. McDonald also became the first left hander quarterback to make the team in franchise history.

In 1987, he beat rookie Kevin Sweeney for the third-string quarterback job, leading the team with a 92.0 quarterback rating in pre-season. The players went on a strike in the third week of the season. Earlier games were canceled, reducing the 16-game season to 15 games. The NFL decided that the games were going to be played with replacement players. Sweeney was signed to be a part of the Dallas Cowboys replacement team. Sweeney had success, and he was kept on the roster for the rest of the year along with McDonald. On August 23, 1988, he was released without playing a down in his time with the team.

== Personal life ==
McDonald went into business after football, working as a Financial Consultant for Merrill Lynch, Vice President for Wells Fargo Bank and Senior Vice President at Fidelity National Title Insurance Company.

McDonald did radio color commentary for USC Trojans football games and lives in Newport Beach, California. He received the award for being the best radio color analyst given yearly by the Southern California Sports Broadcasters Association in 2002 and 2004. He co-authored the book Thru the Tunnel: True Stories of Sports and Life That Empower Your Spirit (2022). The book was used to launch GameChange, a sports media and personal empowerment education company that McDonald co-founded with Jack Baric, an Emmy Award winning filmmaker. The company website is gamechangenation.com. McDonald and Baric first met when they collaborated on A City Divided, a documentary film about the USC vs. UCLA football rivalry, which was used as a catalyst of "Rivals United for a Kure," a campaign to raise funds for cancer research.

His son Mike, was the third-string quarterback for the USC Trojans behind John David Booty and Mark Sanchez, during the 2006 and 2007 seasons. He also was a part of two national championship teams. McDonald's middle son, Andrew played quarterback at New Mexico State (2012–2013). His youngest son, Matt, started at quarterback for three years at Bowling Green (2020–2022) after seeing limited playing time for Boston College in 2017-2018

== See also ==
- List of NCAA major college football yearly passing leaders
