= Mike Haffner (American football) =

American football player (1942–2024)

No. 84, 35
- Position: Wide receiver

Personal information
- Born: July 7, 1942; Waterloo, Iowa, U.S.
- Died: October 22, 2024 (aged 82); Las Vegas, Nevada, U.S.

Career information
- College: UCLA
- NFL draft: 1965: undrafted

Career history
- Hartford Charter Oaks (1965); Denver Broncos (1968–1970); Cincinnati Bengals (1971)

Awards and highlights
- 2× Second-team All-PCC (1961, 1964)

Career NFL statistics
- Receptions: 59
- Receiving yards: 991
- Touchdowns: 7
- Stats at Pro Football Reference

Michael Arthur Haffner (July 7, 1942 – October 22, 2024) was an American professional football player who was a wide receiver for four seasons with the Denver Broncos (1968–1970) and Cincinnati Bengals (1971). He played college football for the UCLA Bruins. As of 2017's NFL off-season, he still held the Broncos rookie franchise record for yards per reception at 30.5, for a 4 reception, 122 yard performance on December 14, 1968, against the Kansas City Chiefs.

== Life and career ==
After retirement, Haffner was a color commentator for the NFL on NBC. He is most noted for being the sideline reporter who inadvertently captured on his live microphone a two‐word expletive uttered by Terry Donahue who was voicing his disapproval over a Bruins interception being nullified due to a penalty in NBC's Christmas Day telecast of the 1978 Fiesta Bowl. Haffner and Donohue had been roommates at UCLA.

Haffner died in Las Vegas on October 22, 2024 at the age of 82.
