= 1978 Oregon Ducks football team =

American college football season

1978 Oregon Ducks football
- Conference: Pacific-10 Conference
- Record: 2–9 (2–5 Pac-10)
- Head coach: Rich Brooks (2nd season)
- Offensive coordinator: John Becker (2nd season)
- Defensive coordinator: Howard Tippett (2nd season)
- Captain: Game captains
- Home stadium: Autzen Stadium

1978 Pacific-10 Conference football standings
	Conf.					Overall
Team	W		L		T	W		L		T
No. 2 USC $	6	–	1	–	0	12	–	1	–	0
No. 14 UCLA	6	–	2	–	0	8	–	3	–	1
Washington	6	–	2	–	0	7	–	4	–	0
Arizona State	4	–	3	–	0	9	–	3	–	0
No. 17 Stanford	4	–	3	–	0	8	–	4	–	0
California	3	–	4	–	0	6	–	5	–	0
Arizona	3	–	4	–	0	5	–	6	–	0
Oregon	2	–	5	–	0	2	–	9	–	0
Oregon State	2	–	6	–	0	3	–	7	–	1
Washington State	1	–	7	–	0	3	–	7	–	1
$ – Conference champion; Rankings from AP Poll

The 1978 Oregon Ducks football team represented the University of Oregon in the Pacific-10 Conference (Pac-10) during the 1978 NCAA Division I-A football season. The Ducks compiled a 2–9 record (2–5 against Pac-10 opponents), finished eighth in the Pac-10, and were outscored 212 to 173.

== Schedule ==
Date	Opponent	Site	Result	Attendance	Source
September 9	at Colorado*	Folsom Field; Boulder, CO	L 7–24	45,389	
September 16	No. 8 USC	Autzen Stadium; Eugene, OR	L 10–37	31,000	
September 23	TCU*	Autzen Stadium; Eugene, OR	L 10–14	30,500	
September 30	at Wisconsin*	Camp Randall Stadium; Madison, WI	L 19–22	63,988	
October 7	at California	California Memorial Stadium; Berkeley, CA	L 18–21	40,350	
October 14	BYU*	Autzen Stadium; Eugene, OR	L 16–17	24,500	
October 21	at Washington	Husky Stadium; Seattle, WA (rivalry)	L 14–20	49,602	
October 28	Washington State	Autzen Stadium; Eugene, OR	W 31–7	25,000	
November 4	at No. 9 UCLA	Los Angeles Memorial Coliseum; Los Angeles, CA	L 21–23	37,315	
November 11	Arizona	Autzen Stadium; Eugene, OR	L 3–24	26,200	
November 25	at Oregon State	Parker Stadium; Corvallis, OR (Civil War)	W 24–3	36,000	
*Non-conference game; Rankings from AP Poll released prior to the game

== Season summary ==
=== at Oregon State ===
External videos
- 1978 Oregon at Oregon State - game highlights

== Roster ==
1978 Oregon Ducks football team roster
Players
Coaches
Offense

Pos.	#	Name	Class
OL		Kevin Anderson
WR		Paul Bahctold
TE		Tim Beyer
WR		Jon Brosterhous
TE		Dan Clark
RB		Rich Clough
WR		Don Coleman
QB		Dan Daly
OL		Mike Delegato
QB		Tim Durando
OL		Steve Greatwood
OL		Bill Hoffman
WR		Curt Jackson
QB		Mike Kennedy
OL		Steve Kleffner
OL		Pete Laughlin
WR		Rourke Lowe
OL		Jamey Matthews
OL		Pat McDougall
WR		Ken Page
RB		Ed Radcliff
RB		Curt Renstrom
RB	2	Dwight Robertson
RB		Vince Williams
RB		Jeff Wood
RB		Reggie Young

Defense

Pos.	#	Name	Class
LB	45	Bruce Beekley	Sr
LB		Mike Berkich
LB		Willie Blasher
DB		Kenny Bryant
LB		Chris Cosgrove
DB		Jerome Covington
DT	92	Terry Dion	Jr
DE	90	Neil Elshire	Jr
DL		Vince Goldsmith
DB	24	Jay Kay	Jr
LB	16	Bryan Hinkle	So
DB		Rick Hudnell
DB		Jim Johnson
DL		Mike Kesler
DB		Ken Lawler
DB		Mike Nolan
DB		Rock Richmond
LB		Rich Schwartz
DL		Scott Setterlund
LB		Tom Webb

Special teams

Pos.	#	Name	Class
P		Mike Babb
K		Pat English
P		Tom Reedal

Head coach

- Rich Brooks

Coordinators/assistant coaches

Legend

- (C) Team captain
- (S) Suspended
- (I) Ineligible
- Injured
- Redshirt

Roster
Last update: 2015-12-20
