= Kevin Williams (wide receiver, born 1958) =

American football player (1958–1996)

No. 21, 84, 86
- Position: Wide receiver

Personal information
- Born: January 7, 1958; Los Angeles, California, U.S.
- Died: February 1, 1996 (aged 38); Cajon Junction, California, U.S.
- Listed height: 5 ft 8 in (1.73 m)
- Listed weight: 164 lb (74 kg)

Career information
- High school: San Fernando (San Fernando, California)
- College: USC
- NFL draft: 1981: 7th round, 167th overall pick

Career history
- New Orleans Saints (1981)*; Baltimore Colts (1981); Los Angeles Express (1983); Denver Gold (1983-1984); San Antonio Gunslingers (1985)
- * Offseason or practice squad member only

Awards and highlights
- National champion (1978); First-team All-Pac-10 (1978); Second-team All-Pac-10 (1979)

Career NFL statistics
- Return yards: 399
- Stats at Pro Football Reference

Kevin Lewis Williams (January 7, 1958 – February 1, 1996) was an American professional football wide receiver in the National Football League (NFL) who played for the Baltimore Colts. He played college football for the USC Trojans. Williams also had a career in the United States Football League (USFL) for the Denver Gold, Los Angeles Express, and San Antonio Gunslingers

Williams was also a standout in track and field as a sprinter for USC. He won the 1978, 1979, and 1980 NCAA Championships 4 × 100 m, though his 1978 title was later revoked due to a teammate being declared ineligible.

Williams died in a train crash on February 1, 1996.
