= 1978 Washington State Cougars football team =

American college football season

1978 Washington State Cougars football
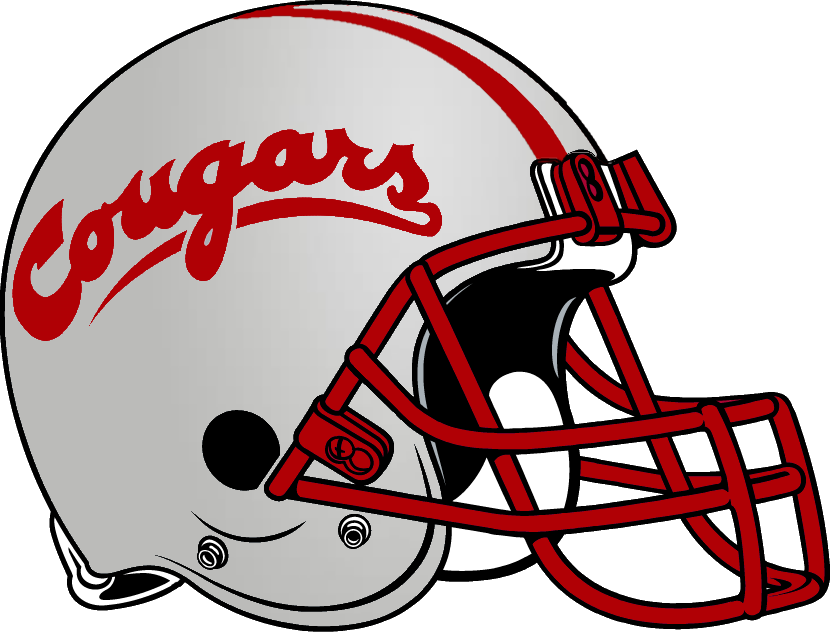
- Conference: Pacific-10 Conference
- Record: 4–6–1 (2–6 Pac-10)
- Head coach: Jim Walden (1st season)
- Home stadium: Martin Stadium, Joe Albi Stadium

1978 Pacific-10 Conference football standings
	Conf.					Overall
Team	W		L		T	W		L		T
No. 2 USC $	6	–	1	–	0	12	–	1	–	0
No. 14 UCLA	6	–	2	–	0	8	–	3	–	1
Washington	6	–	2	–	0	7	–	4	–	0
Arizona State	4	–	3	–	0	9	–	3	–	0
No. 17 Stanford	4	–	3	–	0	8	–	4	–	0
California	3	–	4	–	0	6	–	5	–	0
Arizona	3	–	4	–	0	5	–	6	–	0
Oregon	2	–	5	–	0	2	–	9	–	0
Oregon State	2	–	6	–	0	3	–	7	–	1
Washington State	1	–	7	–	0	3	–	7	–	1
$ – Conference champion; Rankings from AP Poll

The 1978 Washington State Cougars football team was an American football team that represented Washington State University in the Pacific-10 Conference (Pac-10) during the 1978 NCAA Division I-A football season. Under new head coach Jim Walden, the Cougars compiled a 4–6–1 record (2–6 in Pac-10, last), and were outscored 296 to 276. The six home games were split evenly between Martin Stadium on campus in Pullman and Joe Albi Stadium in Spokane.

The team's statistical leaders included Jack Thompson with 2,333 passing yards, Tali Ena with 728 rushing yards, and Mike Wilson with 451 receiving yards.

This was the first football season in the newly expanded Pac-10; the Cougars met the two new members, Arizona and Arizona State, but did not play the USC Trojans.

Senior quarterback Thompson was ninth in the balloting for the Heisman Trophy, and was the third overall selection of the 1979 NFL draft, taken by the Cincinnati Bengals.

The offensive backs coach in 1977 under Warren Powers, Walden was promoted that December and became the Cougars' fourth head coach in four seasons (Jim Sweeney (1975), Jackie Sherrill (1976), and Powers). He led the WSU program for nine years.

After this season, the running track in Martin Stadium was removed, the playing field was lowered, and the capacity was expanded with new lower seating.

== Schedule ==
Date	Opponent	Site	Result	Attendance	Source
September 9	UNLV*	Joe Albi Stadium; Spokane, WA	W 34–7	26,250	
September 16	Idaho*	Martin Stadium; Pullman, WA (rivalry)	W 28–0	16,950	
September 23	Arizona State	Joe Albi Stadium; Spokane, WA	W 51–26	33,507	
September 30	Army*	Michie Stadium; West Point, NY	T 21–21	31,612	
October 14	at No. 14 UCLA	Los Angeles Memorial Coliseum; Los Angeles, CA	L 31–45	40,023	
October 21	Stanford^{†}	Martin Stadium; Pullman, WA	L 27–43	27,411	
October 28	at Oregon ^	Autzen Stadium; Eugene, OR	W 7–31	25,000	
November 4	Oregon State	Martin Stadium; Pullman, WA	L 31–32	20,061	
November 11	at California	California Memorial Stadium; Berkeley, CA	L 14–22	28,750	
November 18	at Arizona	Arizona Stadium; Tucson, AZ	L 24–31	49,557	
November 25	Washington	Joe Albi Stadium; Spokane, WA (Apple Cup)	L 8–38	35,187	
*Non-conference game; ^{†}Homecoming; Rankings from AP Poll released prior to the game

^ Note: The Oregon game was later forfeited to Washington State by order of the Pacific-10 Conference

== Roster ==
1978 Washington State Cougars football team roster
Players
Coaches
Offense

Pos.	#	Name	Class
TE	88	Ron Bull	Sr
QB	9	Clete Casper	Fr
C	77	Mark Chandless	Sr
RB	29	Tali Ena	Jr
RB	25	Harold Gillum	Sr
QB	18	Steve Grant	Sr
TE	81	Gus Hobus	Sr
G	66	Steve Jackson	Jr
OT	72	Allan Kennedy	So
G	65	Tom Larsen	Sr
OT	62	Mike Lemke	Sr
QB	11	Samoa Samoa	Jr
QB, RB	10	Brian Sickler	So
QB	14	Jack Thompson	Sr
TB	26	Mike Washington	So
FL	21	Jim Whatley	So
RB	31	Ray Williams	Jr
SE	86	Mike Wilson	So

Defense

Pos.	#	Name	Class
SS	19	Jack Brossman	Sr
LB	32	Sam Busch	Jr
MG	40	Tom Everson	Sr
CB	41	Jeff Files	Fr
LB	96	Raleigh Fletcher	Sr
MG	61	Brian Flones	So
FS	28	Bob Gregor	Jr
DT	76	Spud Harris	Jr
DE	58	Mark Hicks	Sr
LB	35	Jeff Jones	Jr
LB	39	Don Nevels	Jr
LB	47	Scott Pelluer	So
DT	68	Greg Porter	So
DE	38	Mel Sanders	Jr
CB	17	Randall Simmons	Sr
CB	13	Mike Snow	Jr
DT	64	Steve Swift	Sr
DE	36	Tom Thompson	Sr
DT	50	George Yarno	Sr

Special teams

Pos.	#	Name	Class
P	16	Tim Davey	Fr
K	22	Paul Watson	Sr

Head coach

- Jim Walden (1st year)

Coordinators/assistant coaches

- Mike Church – (LB)
- Gary Gagnon – (RB)
- Rich Glover – (DL)
- Lindsay Hughes – (DE)
- Steve Morton – (TE)
- Pat Ruel – (OL)
- Al Sandahl – (QB)
- Dave Walker – (DL)
- Jerry Wamsley – (DB)
- Ken Woody – (WR)

Legend

- (C) Team captain
- (S) Suspended
- (I) Ineligible
- Injured
- Redshirt

== Awards ==
- All-American: QB Jack Thompson (Playboy, Preseason, Sporting News, 1st)
- All-Pac-10: QB Jack Thompson (1st), C Mark Chandless
- All-West Coast: Jack Thompson (UPI, 2nd)
- Frank Butler Award: Jack Thompson
- J. Fred Bohler Award: Tom Larsen
- Laurie Niemi Award: Mark Chandless

== NFL draft ==
One Cougar was selected in the 1979 NFL draft.

Player	Position	Round	Overall	Franchise
Jack Thompson	QB	1	3	Cincinnati Bengals
