= 1978 California Golden Bears football team =

American college football season

1978 California Golden Bears football
- Conference: Pacific-10 Conference
- Record: 6–5 (3–4 Pac-10)
- Head coach: Roger Theder (1st season)
- Home stadium: California Memorial Stadium

1978 Pacific-10 Conference football standings
| | Conf. | | | | | Overall |
| Team | W | | L | | T | W | | L | | T |
|---|---|---|---|---|---|---|---|---|---|---|
| No. 2 USC $ | 6 | – | 1 | – | 0 | 12 | – | 1 | – | 0 |
| No. 14 UCLA | 6 | – | 2 | – | 0 | 8 | – | 3 | – | 1 |
| Washington | 6 | – | 2 | – | 0 | 7 | – | 4 | – | 0 |
| Arizona State | 4 | – | 3 | – | 0 | 9 | – | 3 | – | 0 |
| No. 17 Stanford | 4 | – | 3 | – | 0 | 8 | – | 4 | – | 0 |
| California | 3 | – | 4 | – | 0 | 6 | – | 5 | – | 0 |
| Arizona | 3 | – | 4 | – | 0 | 5 | – | 6 | – | 0 |
| Oregon | 2 | – | 5 | – | 0 | 2 | – | 9 | – | 0 |
| Oregon State | 2 | – | 6 | – | 0 | 3 | – | 7 | – | 1 |
| Washington State | 1 | – | 7 | – | 0 | 3 | – | 7 | – | 1 |
$ – Conference champion; Rankings from AP Poll

The 1978 California Golden Bears football team was an American football team that represented the University of California, Berkeley during the 1978 NCAA Division I-A football season. Under head coach Roger Theder, the team compiled an overall record of 6–5 and 3–4 in conference.

== Schedule ==
| Date | Opponent | Site | Result | Attendance | Source |
|---|---|---|---|---|---|
| September 9 | at No. 10 Nebraska* | Memorial Stadium; Lincoln, NE | L 26–36 | 75,780 | |
| September 16 | at Georgia Tech* | Grant Field; Atlanta, GA | W 34–22 | 26,577 | |
| September 23 | Pacific (CA)* | California Memorial Stadium; Berkeley, CA | W 24–6 | 37,500 | |
| September 30 | at West Virginia* | Mountaineer Field; Morgantown, WV | W 28–21 | 33,190 | |
| October 7 | Oregon | California Memorial Stadium; Berkeley, CA | W 21–18 | 40,350 | |
| October 14 | at Arizona | Arizona Stadium; Tucson, AZ | W 33–20 | 54,121 | |
| October 21 | No. 10 UCLA | California Memorial Stadium; Berkeley, CA (rivalry) | L 0–45 | 62,500 | |
| October 28 | at No. 6 USC | Los Angeles Memorial Coliseum; Los Angeles, CA | L 17–42 | 56,954 | |
| November 4 | at Arizona State | Sun Devil Stadium; Tempe, AZ | L 21–35 | 70,876 | |
| November 11 | Washington State | California Memorial Stadium; Berkeley, CA | W 22–14 | 28,750 | |
| November 18 | Stanford | California Memorial Stadium; Berkeley, CA (Big Game) | L 10–30 | 77,880 | |
*Non-conference game; Rankings from AP Poll released prior to the game

== Personnel ==
1978 California Golden Bears football team roster
| Players | | | Coaches |
|---|---|---|---|
| Offense: Pos. / # / Name / Class; QB / / Rich Campbell / So | Defense: Pos. / # / Name / Class | Special teams: Pos. / # / Name / Class | Head coach: Roger Theder; Coordinators/assistant coaches Legend: (C) Team captain; (S) Suspended; (I) Ineligible; Injured; Redshirt |
