= 1978 Arizona Wildcats football team =

American college football season

1978 Arizona Wildcats football
- Conference: Pacific-10 Conference
- Record: 5–6 (3–4 Pac-10)
- Head coach: Tony Mason (2nd season)
- Home stadium: Arizona Stadium

1978 Pacific-10 Conference football standings
	Conf.					Overall
Team	W		L		T	W		L		T
No. 2 USC $	6	–	1	–	0	12	–	1	–	0
No. 14 UCLA	6	–	2	–	0	8	–	3	–	1
Washington	6	–	2	–	0	7	–	4	–	0
Arizona State	4	–	3	–	0	9	–	3	–	0
No. 17 Stanford	4	–	3	–	0	8	–	4	–	0
California	3	–	4	–	0	6	–	5	–	0
Arizona	3	–	4	–	0	5	–	6	–	0
Oregon	2	–	5	–	0	2	–	9	–	0
Oregon State	2	–	6	–	0	3	–	7	–	1
Washington State	1	–	7	–	0	3	–	7	–	1
$ – Conference champion; Rankings from AP Poll

The 1978 Arizona Wildcats football team season represented the University of Arizona in the Pacific-10 Conference (Pac-10) during the 1978 NCAA Division I-A football season. In their second season under head coach Tony Mason, the Wildcats compiled a 5–6 record (3–4 against Pac-10 opponents), finished in a tie for sixth place in the Pac-10, and outscored their opponents, 245 to 205. The team played its home games in Arizona Stadium in Tucson, Arizona. This is the first year in which Arizona, along with rival Arizona State, joined the Pac-10 (previously the Pac-8 prior to both Arizona schools’ joining the conference).

The team's statistical leaders included Jim Krohn with 991 passing yards, Hubert Oliver with 866 rushing yards, and Ron Beyer with 296 receiving yards. Linebacker Sam Giangardella led the team with 131 total tackles.

== Schedule ==
Date	Opponent	Rank	Site	Result	Attendance	Source
September 9	Kansas State*		Arizona Stadium; Tucson, AZ	W 31–0	50,484	
September 16	Oregon State		Arizona Stadium; Tucson, AZ	W 21–7	49,056	
September 23	at Texas Tech*		Jones Stadium; Lubbock, TX	L 26–41	41,712	
September 30	Iowa*		Arizona Stadium; Tucson, AZ	W 23–3	46,851	
October 7	at No. 3 Michigan*		Michigan Stadium; Ann Arbor, MI	L 17–21	104,913	
October 14	California		Arizona Stadium; Tucson, AZ	L 20–33	54,121	
October 27	at No. 10 UCLA		Los Angeles Memorial Coliseum; Los Angeles, CA	L 14–24	41,077	
November 4	at No. 20 Washington		Husky Stadium; Seattle, WA	L 21–31	47,587	
November 11	at Oregon		Autzen Stadium; Eugene, OR	W 24–3	26,200	
November 18	Washington State^{†}		Arizona Stadium; Tucson, AZ	W 31–24	49,557	
November 25	Arizona State		Arizona Stadium; Tucson, AZ (rivalry)	L 17–18	58,090	
*Non-conference game; ^{†}Homecoming; Rankings from AP Poll released prior to the game

== Before the season ==
Arizona and Arizona State joined the Pac-8 prior to the start of the 1978 season after spending several years as members of the Western Athletic Conference (WAC). The Pac-8 was then renamed the Pac-10 after the two schools joined the conference. Both schools went to the Pac-10 to compete for championships and that the conference had more money in revenue and more scholarships offered. The Wildcats finished the 1977 season with a record of 5–7 in Mason's first season with the team.

== Game summaries ==
=== Kansas State ===
In the season opener, Arizona played their first game as a Pac-10 member and faced Kansas State (whose nickname was also the Wildcats, like Arizona). Arizona would dominate the game in a shutout win.

=== Oregon State ===
In Arizona's first Pac-10 game, they defeated Oregon State to improve on their record. It was their first home win over a Pac-10 opponent.

=== Michigan ===
The Wildcats went on the road at Michigan for only their second meeting against the Wolverines (the first was in 1970, also on the road). Arizona fought hard with third-ranked Michigan, and ultimately came up short at a chance of an upset. To date, this remains Arizona’s most recent meeting against Michigan (the Wildcats have yet to host the Wolverines at home, and is unlikely to in the foreseeable future).

=== UCLA ===
In their first Pac-10 road game, Arizona traveled to UCLA and faced the No. 10 Bruins. The Wildcats would end up losing to the Bruins for their first Pac-10 road loss.

=== Oregon ===
Arizona went to Oregon and defeated the Ducks to win their first road Pac-10 game.

=== Arizona State ===
Arizona and Arizona State met in their first rivalry matchup as Pac-10 members. In a back and forth game, Arizona State led late in the fourth quarter and the Wildcats had a chance to possibly win it, but missed a field goal in the final seconds to lose to ASU yet again.

== Season notes ==
- Arizona's season was heavily affected by a difficult schedule, especially by the transition to the Pac-10 and with games against tough opponents that were ranked in the top 20 at one point. The Wildcats played three ranked teams and subsequently lost to all of them.
- Due to their move to the Pac-10, the Wildcats did not play rival New Mexico for the first time since 1946.
- In late September through early October, the Wildcats played against two consecutive Big Ten teams and earned a split.
- The loss to California was Arizona's first in a Pac-10 game as well as their first home loss in a Pac-10 game.
- Arizona and UCLA played on a Friday due to the fact that UCLA and USC shared the same stadium (Los Angeles Memorial Coliseum) at the time. The day after UCLA's victory over the Wildcats (which was a Saturday), USC played California at the Coliseum.
- The game against Arizona State was the last time that the Wildcats faced legendary ASU coach Frank Kush, who was fired midway through the 1979 season after mistreating one of his players. Under Kush, ASU dominated Arizona, as the Wildcats won only five times against the Sun Devils dating back to 1958 at the time.
- The loss against ASU would also draw similar results for Arizona in the future, as they would deal with missed field goals against ASU in 1992 and 2018, which would lead to painful losses to end both seasons. However in the following season, the Wildcats would reverse course by actually making a winning field goal to defeat the Sun Devils.
- Arizona did not play against Pac-10 members USC or Stanford this season.

== After the season ==
Arizona would improve in 1979, with them Mason predicting that the team would contend for a bowl, in which they did. Mason would take the Wildcats to the Fiesta Bowl, but would later be forced out due to alleged scandal that involved him and his players.

== Personnel ==
1978 Arizona Wildcats football team roster
Players			Coaches
Offense: Pos. / # / Name / Class; QB / / Jim Krohn	Defense: Pos. / # / Name / Class	Special teams: Pos. / # / Name / Class; K / / Bill Zivic	Head coach: Tony Mason; Coordinators/assistant coaches: Tom Roggeman; Legend: (C) Team captain; (S) Suspended; (I) Ineligible; Injured; Redshirt
