= Rich Dimler =

American football player (1956–2000)

No. 92
- Position: Defensive tackle

Personal information
- Born: July 18, 1956; Bayonne, New Jersey, U.S.
- Died: September 30, 2000 (aged 44); Torrance, California, U.S.
- Listed height: 6 ft 6 in (1.98 m)
- Listed weight: 260 lb (118 kg)

Career information
- High school: Bayonne (Bayonne, New Jersey)
- College: USC (1975–1978)
- NFL draft: 1979: 5th round, 124th overall pick

Career history
- Cleveland Browns (1979); Green Bay Packers (1980); Los Angeles Express (1983–1984); Philadelphia Stars (1984)

Awards and highlights
- First-team All-Pac-10 (1978)
- Stats at Pro Football Reference

Richard Alan Dimler (July 18, 1956 – September 30, 2000) was a former nose tackle in the National Football League (NFL).

== Biography ==
Dimler was born Richard Alan Dimler on July 18, 1956, to Alan and Marie Dimler in Bayonne, New Jersey. Richard was the middle child in a family of three which included sisters Mary Dimler and Debra Dimler. He graduated from Bayonne High School in 1975, playing football all four years. He was recruited by USC, again playing all four years, lettering all four years. He was then drafted by the Cleveland Browns of the NFL. He was very close to his niece and nephews Keith Dimler, Kristen Dimler, Josh Haggin and Dillon Haggin. He died due to pancreatitis on September 30, 2000, in Torrance, California.

== Career ==
Dimler was selected in the fifth round of the 1979 NFL draft by the Cleveland Browns and played that season with the team. The following season, he played with the Green Bay Packers. He also played for the Philadelphia Stars and the Los Angeles Express (USFL) of the United States Football League.

He played at the collegiate level at the University of Southern California, where he was a co-captain of the 1978 National Champion Trojans team.
