= Dennis Johnson (linebacker) =

American football player (born 1958)

No. 52, 55
- Position: Linebacker

Personal information
- Born: June 19, 1958 (age 68); Flint, Michigan, U.S.
- Listed height: 6 ft 3 in (1.91 m)
- Listed weight: 234 lb (106 kg)

Career information
- High school: Northwestern (Flint)
- College: USC
- NFL draft: 1980: 4th round, 92nd overall pick

Career history
- Minnesota Vikings (1980–1985); Tampa Bay Buccaneers (1985)

Awards and highlights
- National champion (1978); First-team All-American (1979); 2× First-team All-Pac-10 (1978, 1979)

Career NFL statistics
- Games played-started: 85-49
- Sacks: 1
- Fumble recoveries: 5
- Stats at Pro Football Reference

Dennis Craig Johnson (born June 19, 1958) is an American former professional football player who was a linebacker in the National Football League (NFL). He played six seasons for the Minnesota Vikings (1980–1985) and the Tampa Bay Buccaneers (1985). He played college football for the USC Trojans.
