= Pat Ruel =

American football player and coach (born 1950)

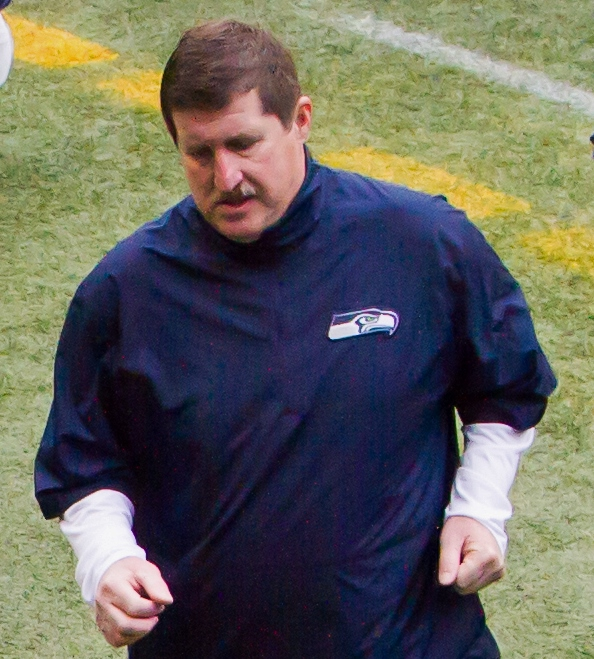
- Ruel in 2013

Personal information
- Born: December 5, 1950 (age 75); Coral Gables, Florida, U.S.

Career information
- High school: Coral Gables Senior (Coral Gables, Florida)
- College: Miami (FL)

Career history
- Miami (FL) (1973–1976) Offensive line graduate assistant; Arkansas (1977) Offensive line graduate assistant; Washington State (1978–1981) Offensive coordinator/offensive line coach; Texas A&M (1982–1984) Offensive coordinator/offensive line coach; Northern Illinois (1985–1987) Offensive coordinator/offensive line coach; Kansas (1988–1996) Offensive coordinator/offensive line coach; Michigan State (1998–1999) Offensive line coach; Detroit Lions (2000) Offensive line coach; Green Bay Packers (2001–2002) Offensive line coach; Buffalo Bills (2003) Offensive line coach; New York Giants (2004) Offensive line coach; USC (2005–2009) Offensive line coach; Seattle Seahawks (2010–2019) Assistant offensive line coach

Awards and highlights
- Super Bowl champion (XLVIII)

Golden Pat Ruel (born December 5, 1950) is an American former football coach. He was the offensive coordinator for Washington State from 1978 to 1981, Northern Illinois from 1985 to 1987, Kansas from 1988 to 1996, and offensive line coach for several National Football League (NFL) teams.

== Career ==
Ruel has 35 years of college and National Football League coaching experience.

Ruel lettered at offensive guard for the University of Miami under head coach Fran Curci and received his B.S. in psychology in 1972, then became a graduate assistant coach in 1973. He and Seattle Seahawks head coach Pete Carroll were both graduate assistants at Arkansas in 1977. Former Mississippi head coach Houston Nutt was also at Arkansas at the same time, as a backup quarterback. Razorbacks' defensive coordinator Monte Kiffin was a mentor to Carroll, who later hired Kiffin's son Lane as his offensive coordinator at USC.

Arkansas routed favored Oklahoma in the Orange Bowl and Ruel moved on to a full-time position at Washington State University in Pullman under new head coach Jim Walden. He spent four years with the Cougars, the first two as the offensive line coach, then added offensive coordinator duties in 1980 and 1981, when WSU made its first bowl appearance in over a half century.

Ruel's longest tenure was at Kansas from 1988 to 1996, the first three as the offensive coordinator and offensive line coach, then adding assistant head coach to his title the final six years. During his first summer Lawrence, he joined the coaches and 50 or so scholarship players in sleeping on the practice field for solidarity. During his time at Kansas, the Jayhawks improved from 1–10 in 1988 to 10–2 in 1995, finishing in the top ten.

Ruel spent 1997 in private business, then moved on to Michigan State for two years (1998–99). The first year with the Spartans he served as offensive line coach and then added assistant head coach duties in the second season. He was hired by the NFL's Detroit Lions in 2000 to take over as offensive line coach. Ruel spent the next two seasons (2001–02) as the assistant offensive line coach for the Green Bay Packers. In 2003, he took over offensive line coach duties for the Buffalo Bills before moving the New York Giants for the 2004 season.

Ruel joined the Trojans in February 2005. Carroll lured Ruel away from the NFL's Giants, taking him to lunch on a sunny day in Manhattan Beach. Ruel found Carroll to be charming, noting "Pete's like a beautiful woman. The closer you get, you better look out. He is very charismatic. He can smile and make you feel like a million dollars." His players at USC included Sam Baker, Winston Justice, Ryan Kalil, Deuce Lutui, Fred Matua, Chilo Rachal, Drew Radovich, Matt Spanos, and Kyle Williams. After Carroll signed with the Seahawks, Ruel was released from USC on January 20, 2010, and joined the Seahawks five months later after Alex Gibbs sudden retirement. He won his first Super Bowl title when the Seahawks defeated the Denver Broncos in Super Bowl XLVIII. Ruel retired from coaching in July 2020.

== Personal life ==
Ruel's father, Pat Ruel II, was an FBI agent. He is married to Marti Ruel, and together they have a daughter, Sabra, who attends USC. Golden Pat Ruel graduated from Coral Gables Senior High School in Coral Gables, Florida
