= Brad Budde =

American football player (born 1958)

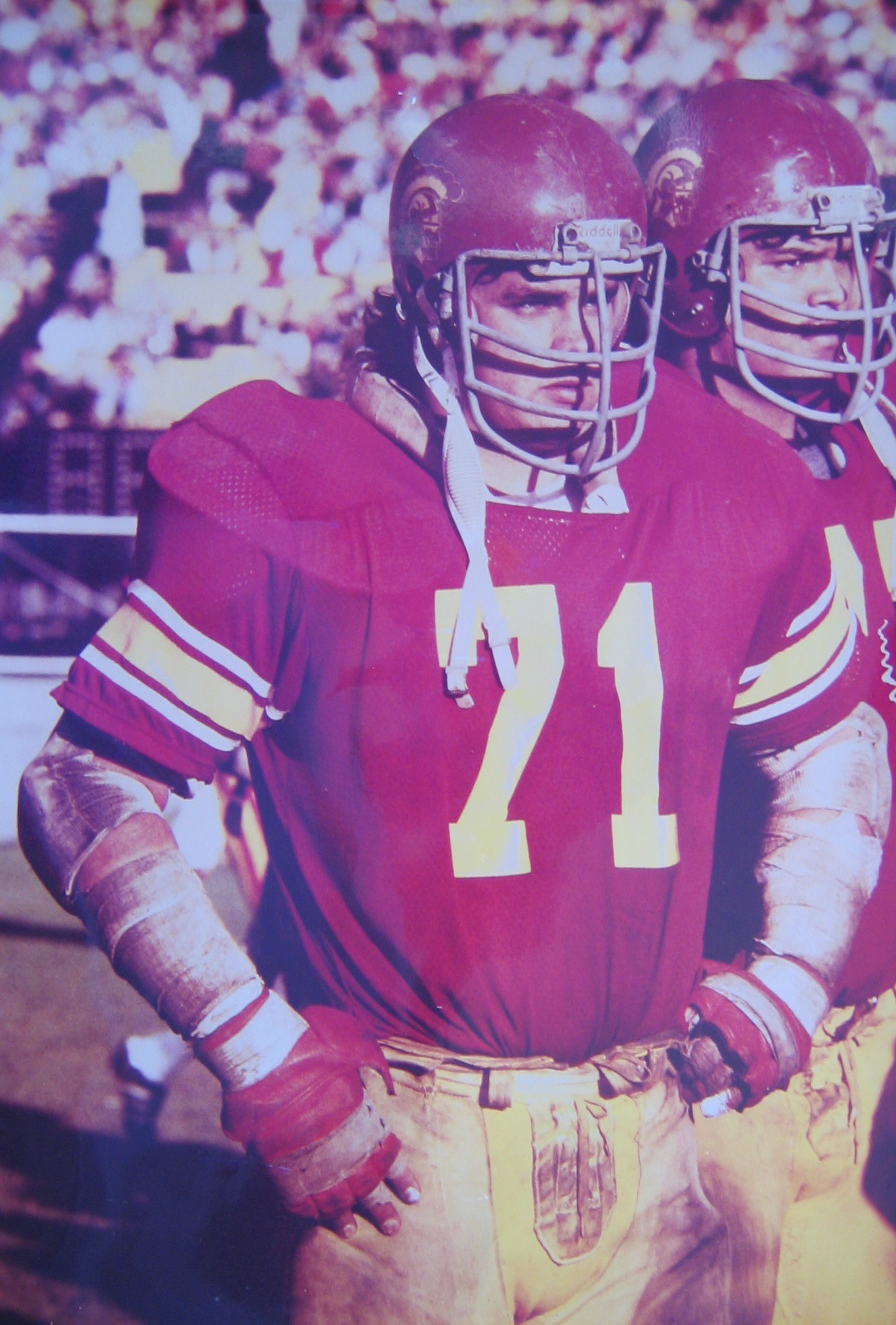

No. 66, 71
- Position: Offensive guard

Personal information
- Born: May 9, 1958 (age 68); Detroit, Michigan, U.S.
- Listed height: 6 ft 4 in (1.93 m)
- Listed weight: 262 lb (119 kg)

Career information
- High school: Kansas City (MO) Rockhurst
- College: USC
- NFL draft: 1980: 1st round, 11th overall pick

Career history
- Kansas City Chiefs (1980–1986); Los Angeles Raiders (1988)*
- * Offseason or practice squad member only

Awards and highlights
- National champion (1978); UPI Lineman of the Year (1979); Lombardi Award (1979); Unanimous All-American (1979); 3× First-team All-Pac-10 (1977, 1978, 1979); Second-team AP All-Time All-American (2025); USC Football Hall of Fame (1999)

Career NFL statistics
- Games played: 92
- Games started: 79
- Stats at Pro Football Reference
- College Football Hall of Fame

Brad Edward Budde (born May 9, 1958) is an American former professional football player who was an offensive guard in the National Football League (NFL) for seven seasons during the 1980s. Budde played college football for the University of Southern California (USC), and was a unanimous All-American and the winner of the Lombardi Award. He was a first-round pick in the 1980 NFL draft, and played professionally for the NFL's Kansas City Chiefs.

== Early life ==
Budde was born in Detroit, Michigan. He attended Rockhurst High School in Kansas City, Missouri.

== College career ==
Budde attended the University of Southern California (USC) and played for the USC Trojans football team from 1976 to 1979. He was the first player since World War II to start as a freshman. Budde is one of USC's most highly decorated offensive lineman. As a senior in 1979, he was a unanimous first-team All-American, runner-up in the Outland Trophy voting, USC Offensive Player of the Year, USC Most Inspirational Player, and an Academic All-American. He was also selected as the first and only Lombardi Award winner in USC's history. In 1980, Budde also earned the NCAA Post Graduate Scholarship. During his career at USC, Budde started in three Rose Bowls, all won by USC. In 1978, led by head coach John Robinson, USC won a share of the national championship.

Budde was elected to the College Football Hall of Fame in 1990, the USC Hall of Fame in 1999, and the Rose Bowl Hall of Fame in 2010.

== Professional career ==
Budde was the eleventh pick in the first round of the 1980 NFL draft by the Kansas City Chiefs. Budde and his father, All-Pro Ed Budde, became the first and only father and son in NFL history to be drafted in the first round to the same team and play the same position. He played for the Chiefs through 1987.

== Personal life ==
Off the field, Budde and his wife, Nicolette, worked with abused and neglected children through Camp Opportunity and Division of Family Services in Kansas City, Missouri.

Following retirement from the NFL in 1988, Budde returned to college and earned his master's degree in physical therapy from Loma Linda University. For the last 17 years, Brad has rehabilitated senior citizens as President of Budde Physical Therapy, Inc. From 1995 to 2005, Brad also worked as the offensive line coach at San Clemente High School and Orange Coast College.

In 2005 Budde founded GameDay Performance Systems, bringing the fundamentals of high performing sports teams into the workplace.

Budde lives with his wife Nicolette in Capistrano Beach, California. They are the parents of two children, Sasha and Beau and grandparents of Maximus Crowley and Azure Crowley. Sasha is a high school English teacher in Irvine, California and won the Teacher of Excellence award for the 2011–12 school year; she resides with her husband Sean in San Clemente, California. Beau is a high school social science teacher and is the quarterbacks coach and offensive coordinator at University High School in Irvine; he and his wife, Annette, live in Orange, California.
