= Anthony Muñoz =

American football player (born 1958)

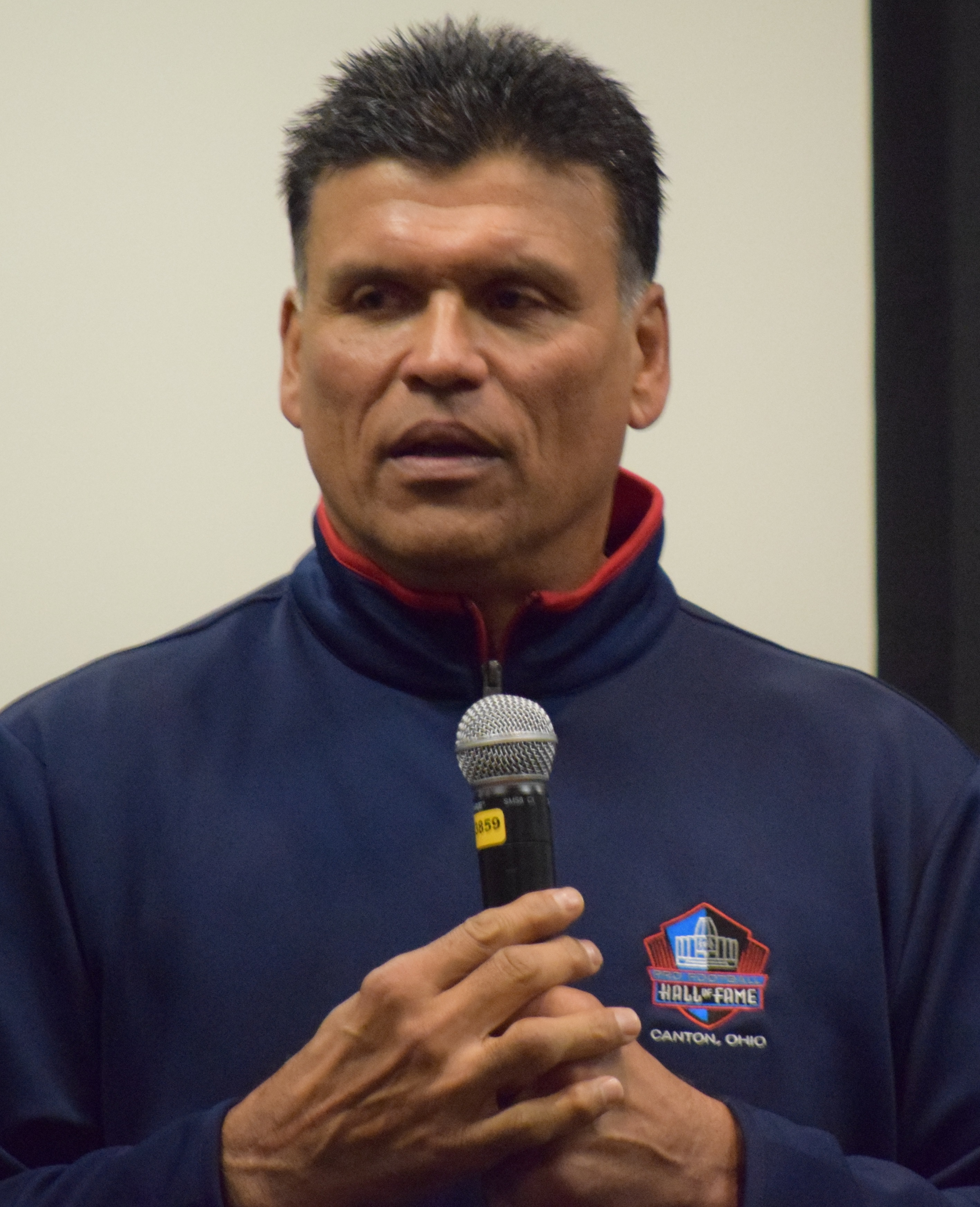
- Muñoz in 2015

No. 78
- Position: Offensive tackle

Personal information
- Born: August 19, 1958 (age 68); Ontario, California, U.S.
- Listed height: 6 ft 6 in (1.98 m)
- Listed weight: 278 lb (126 kg)

Career information
- High school: Chaffey (Ontario)
- College: USC (1976–1979)
- NFL draft: 1980: 1st round, 3rd overall pick

Career history
- Cincinnati Bengals (1980–1992); Tampa Bay Buccaneers (1993)*
- * Offseason or practice squad member only

Awards and highlights
- NFL 100th Anniversary All-Time Team; NFL 75th Anniversary All-Time Team; NFL 1980s All-Decade Team; NFL Man of the Year (1991); 9× first-team All-Pro (1981–1983, 1985–1990); 2× second-team All-Pro (1984, 1991); 11× Pro Bowl (1981–1991); PFWA NFL All-Rookie Team (1980); Cincinnati Bengals Ring of Honor; Cincinnati Bengals 40th Anniversary Team; Cincinnati Bengals 50th Anniversary Team; National champion (1978); Second-team All-American (1978); First-team All-Pac-10 (1978); Second-team All-Pac-8 (1977)

Career NFL statistics
- Games played: 185
- Games started: 182
- Fumble recoveries: 6
- Stats at Pro Football Reference
- Pro Football Hall of Fame

Michael Anthony Muñoz Sr. (born August 19, 1958) is an American former professional football player who played his entire career of 13 seasons with the Cincinnati Bengals of the National Football League (NFL) as an offensive tackle. He played college football for the USC Trojans. In 2022, an ESPN panel named Muñoz as the greatest offensive tackle in NFL history. He was inducted into the Pro Football Hall of Fame in 1998. Muñoz is regarded by many as the greatest player in Bengals history.

== Early life and college ==
Muñoz went to Chaffey High School in Ontario, California, where he earned All-Citrus Belt League and All-CIF Southern Section 4-A Division honors as an offensive lineman on the varsity football team. He also lettered in basketball and baseball playing for the Tigers. He played college football at the University of Southern California from 1976 to 1979. He also played baseball there, pitching for USC's national championship team in 1978. The Trojans won a bowl game in all four of Muñoz's seasons, including three victories in the Rose Bowl. However, injuries had cut Muñoz's freshman and junior seasons short, forcing him to miss the team's Rose Bowl wins in both years.

In the opening game of his senior year, Muñoz suffered torn knee ligaments and had to miss all of the remaining regular season games, though he did return for USC's 17–16 Rose Bowl win over the previously undefeated Ohio State University on New Year's Day in 1980. Muñoz could have requested a medical redshirt, enabling him to play as a 5th year senior in 1980, or simply focused on getting ready for the upcoming NFL draft, but he insisted on coming back for the Rose Bowl. "I can’t imagine missing that experience with my guys," Muñoz explained. USC running back Charles White rushed for a Rose Bowl record 247 yards in the game, including six carries on an 83-yard drive to score the game winning touchdown with 1:32 left, mostly running to left weak side behind Muñoz. "He played the whole ball game, he didn’t get hurt and we won," USC coach John Robinson said of Muñoz after the game. "To me, that’s a perfect game. That’s one of the greatest things I’ve ever seen happen."

== Professional career ==
=== Cincinnati Bengals ===
Muñoz was the third overall pick in the first round of the 1980 NFL draft by the Cincinnati Bengals. His selection was viewed as a major risk by many pundits since knee problems limited the 6 ft. 6 in., 280-pound Muñoz to just a combined 16 games in his final two college seasons.

Muñoz became a starter in his rookie season and remained a fixture at left tackle for the Bengals for 13 seasons and is considered one of the greatest offensive linemen in NFL history. Despite his history of injuries, Muñoz missed just three games during his first 12 seasons. His rigorous workout routine included working out in the weight room he had installed in his home and running three to four miles every day. In addition to his talents as a blocker, Anthony Muñoz was also a capable receiver, notching seven receptions for 18 yards and scoring four touchdowns on tackle-eligible plays, including one in 1984 from rookie quarterback Boomer Esiason against the Cleveland Browns in Cleveland.

Muñoz played in two Super Bowls during his time with the Bengals, XVI and XXIII, both narrow losses to the San Francisco 49ers.

=== Tampa Bay Buccaneers/Retirement ===
After missing much of the 1992 season battling knee and shoulder injuries, Muñoz attempted to play a 14th season with the Tampa Bay Buccaneers, but he was released before the season started and decided to retire shortly after.

=== Legacy ===
Muñoz was the Offensive Lineman of the Year in 1981 and 1988, and was awarded the NFL Players Association Lineman of the Year honors in 1981, 1985, 1988, and 1989. The NFL Alumni Association voted Munoz the Offensive Lineman of the Year four times (1987, 1989–1991). He won the Seagram's Seven Crowns of Sports award for Offensive Lineman of the Year in 1981 and 1986.

At the time of his retirement, his Pro Bowl selections were tied with Tom Mack for the most ever by an offensive lineman in league history, and also set the Bengals franchise record. In 1994, Muñoz was named to the National Football League 75th Anniversary All-Time Team. In 1999, he was ranked #17 on Sporting News' list of the 100 greatest football players and was the highest-ranked offensive lineman. In 2010, he was ranked #12 on the NFL Network's The Top 100: NFL's Greatest Players list and again was the highest-ranked offensive lineman.

In 1998, Muñoz was enshrined in the Pro Football Hall of Fame. He was the first exclusive Cincinnati Bengals player to be enshrined. Shortly after receiving the honor, Muñoz's hometown of Ontario, California, renamed its Colony Park "Anthony Muñoz Hall of Fame Park". The renaming ceremony was held on June 26, 1998, and was attended by Muñoz, his family, city officials, and Ontario residents.

Muñoz was a member of the Bengals inaugural Ring of Honor class in 2021.

While the Bengals have not officially retired it, they have not reissued the number 78 since Muñoz left the team.

== Career highlights ==
NFL

- No. 12 on The Top 100: NFL's Greatest Players
- NFL 100th Anniversary All-Time Team
- NFL 75th Anniversary All-Time Team
- NFL 1980s All-Decade Team
- NFL Man of the Year (1991)
- 9× first-team All-Pro (1981–1983, 1985–1990)
- 2× second-team All-Pro (1984, 1991)
- 11× Pro Bowl (1981–1991)
- PFWA NFL All-Rookie Team (1980)
- Cincinnati Bengals Ring of Honor
- Cincinnati Bengals 40th Anniversary Team
- Cincinnati Bengals 50th Anniversary Team
- Bart Starr Award (1990)
- 4× NFL Players Association Lineman of the Year (1981, 1985, 1988, 1989)
- 4× NFL Alumni Association Offensive Lineman of the Year (1987, 1989–1991)
- 2× Seagram's Seven Crowns of Sports Offensive Lineman of the Year (1981, 1986)

College

- National champion (1978)
- Second-team All-American (1978)
- First-team All-Pac-10 (1978)
- Second-team All-Pac-8 (1977)

Other

- California Sports Hall of Fame

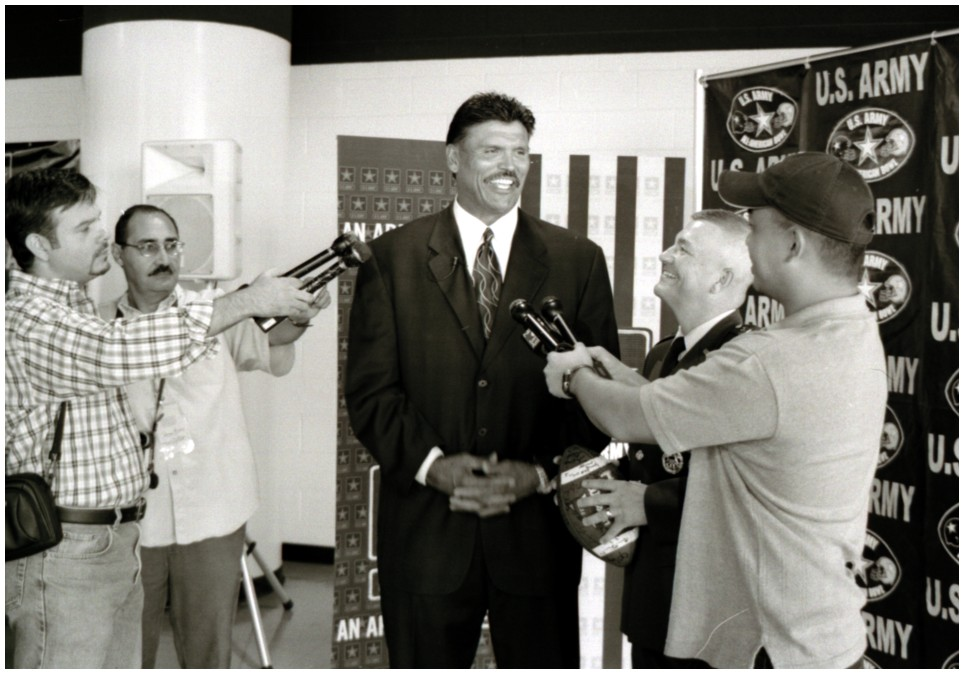
Muñoz in 2004

== Movies and television ==
Muñoz appeared in two motion pictures: 1980's Borderline as "Guatemalan" and 1983's The Right Stuff (an Academy Award nominee for Best Picture) as "Gonzalez".

From 1994 to 1995, Muñoz served as a color commentator on Fox Sports' NFL telecasts and has for many years been color commentator for TV broadcasts of Bengals' preseason games.

== Post-NFL career ==
Since 1992, Muñoz has starred in a series of commercials for the Cincinnati-area furniture store Furniture Fair.

In 2002, the Anthony Muñoz Foundation was created to consolidate Muñoz's charitable activities and encourages area individuals and businesses to "...impact area youth mentally, physically and spiritually". In 2004, Muñoz served on a panel to select the year's recipient of the Walter Payton Award. On November 14, 2012, Allstate dedicated a Hometown Hall of Famers plaque to Muñoz at Chaffey High School. On October 8, 2015, Muñoz received the Congressional Hispanic Caucus Institute (CHCI) Medallion of Excellence for his contributions to the Hispanic community.

Muñoz attended a celebrity flag-football game at Candlestick Park, the last event before the demolition of the stadium in 2014. He describes the event:

The final touchdown pass, there were probably 30,000 people in that stadium viewing a bunch of old guys playing a flag football game, but to see (Montana) throw to (DeBartolo) for the final touchdown there and to hear the fans go crazy and to see the admiration from these former players like Ronnie Lott and Joe Montana; that to me was impressive... to me, that's what it's all about.

Muñoz was a founding board member of the Hispanic Football Hall of Fame in 2025, alongside Ron Rivera.

== Personal life ==
Muñoz family is of Mexican descent from the state of Chihuahua, Mexico and met his wife at USC; they married during his sophomore year in 1978. They have two children. His son Michael played offensive lineman at Tennessee where he was an All-America and went undrafted in 2005. His daughter, Michelle, played basketball at Tennessee and later transferred to Ohio State.

Muñoz is a Christian. He came to faith during his sophomore year at USC.
