= 1978 Oregon State Beavers football team =

American college football season

1978 Oregon State Beavers football
- Conference: Pacific-10 Conference
- Record: 3–7–1 (2–6 Pac-10)
- Head coach: Craig Fertig (3rd season)
- Offensive coordinator: Tony Kopay (3rd season)
- Defensive coordinator: Ray Braun (3rd season)
- Home stadium: Parker Stadium

1978 Pacific-10 Conference football standings
	Conf.					Overall
Team	W		L		T	W		L		T
No. 2 USC $	6	–	1	–	0	12	–	1	–	0
No. 14 UCLA	6	–	2	–	0	8	–	3	–	1
Washington	6	–	2	–	0	7	–	4	–	0
Arizona State	4	–	3	–	0	9	–	3	–	0
No. 17 Stanford	4	–	3	–	0	8	–	4	–	0
California	3	–	4	–	0	6	–	5	–	0
Arizona	3	–	4	–	0	5	–	6	–	0
Oregon	2	–	5	–	0	2	–	9	–	0
Oregon State	2	–	6	–	0	3	–	7	–	1
Washington State	1	–	7	–	0	3	–	7	–	1
$ – Conference champion; Rankings from AP Poll

The 1978 Oregon State Beavers football team represented Oregon State Universityas a member of the Pacific-10 Conference (Pac-10) during the 1978 NCAA Division I-A football season. In their third season under head coach Craig Fertig, the Beavers compiled an overall record of 3–7–1 record with a mark of 2–6 in conference play, placing ninth in the Pac-10, and were outscored 266 to 128. The team played its five home games on campus at Parker Stadium in Corvallis.

== Schedule ==
Date	Opponent	Site	Result	Attendance	Source
September 9	BYU*	Parker Stadium; Corvallis, OR	L 6–10	19,651	
September 16	at Arizona	Arizona Stadium; Tucson, AZ	L 7–21	49,056	
September 23	at Tennessee*	Neyland Stadium; Knoxville, TN	T 13–13	82,048	
September 30	Washington	Parker Stadium; Corvallis, OR	L 0–34	30,000	
October 7	at Minnesota*	Memorial Stadium; Minneapolis, MN	W 17–14	35,083	
October 21	at No. 7 USC	Los Angeles Memorial Coliseum; Los Angeles, CA	L 7–38	53,734	
October 28	at Stanford	Stanford Stadium; Stanford, CA	L 6–24	39,214	
November 4	at Washington State	Martin Stadium; Pullman, WA	W 32–31	20,061	
November 11	No. 9 UCLA	Parker Stadium; Corvallis, OR	W 15–13	28,000	
November 18	Arizona State	Parker Stadium; Corvallis, OR	L 22–44	23,500	
November 25	Oregon	Parker Stadium; Corvallis, OR (Civil War)	L 3–24	36,000	
*Non-conference game; Rankings from AP Poll released prior to the game
