= 1978 Washington Huskies football team =

American college football season

1978 Washington Huskies football
- Conference: Pacific-10 Conference
- Record: 7–4 (6–2 Pac-10)
- Head coach: Don James (4th season)
- Offensive coordinator: Dick Scesniak (4th season)
- Defensive coordinator: Jim Lambright (1st season)
- MVP: Michael Jackson
- Captains: Michael Jackson; Nesby Glasgow; Jeff Toews; Scott Greenwood
- Home stadium: Husky Stadium

1978 Pacific-10 Conference football standings
	Conf.					Overall
Team	W		L		T	W		L		T
No. 2 USC $	6	–	1	–	0	12	–	1	–	0
No. 14 UCLA	6	–	2	–	0	8	–	3	–	1
Washington	6	–	2	–	0	7	–	4	–	0
Arizona State	4	–	3	–	0	9	–	3	–	0
No. 17 Stanford	4	–	3	–	0	8	–	4	–	0
California	3	–	4	–	0	6	–	5	–	0
Arizona	3	–	4	–	0	5	–	6	–	0
Oregon	2	–	5	–	0	2	–	9	–	0
Oregon State	2	–	6	–	0	3	–	7	–	1
Washington State	1	–	7	–	0	3	–	7	–	1
$ – Conference champion; Rankings from AP Poll

The 1978 Washington Huskies football team was an American football team that represented the University of Washington during the 1978 NCAA Division I-A football season. Under fourth-year head coach Don James, the team compiled a 7–4 record, tied for second in the Pacific-10 Conference, and outscored its opponents 270 to 155. Linebacker Michael Jackson was selected as the team's most valuable player. The team captains were Jackson, Nesby Glasgow, Scott Greenwood, and Jeff Toews.

In the newly-expanded Pac-10, the defending champion Huskies returned eighteen starters, but not at quarterback. Washington defeated the two new members, Arizona and Arizona State, and did not play California. The two losses were to UCLA and USC, and the Huskies defeated Washington State in the Apple Cup for the fifth consecutive year.

An unexpected non-conference loss at unranked Indiana in September likely kept Washington out of a bowl game.

== Schedule ==
Date	Opponent	Rank	Site	Result	Attendance	Source
September 9	No. 12 UCLA	No. 11	Husky Stadium; Seattle, WA	L 7–10	55,780	
September 16	Kansas*	No. 18	Husky Stadium; Seattle, WA	W 31–2	49,450	
September 23	at Indiana*	No. 15	Memorial Stadium; Bloomington, IN	L 7–14	40,244	
September 30	at Oregon State		Parker Stadium; Corvallis, OR	W 34–0	30,000	
October 7	No. 8 Alabama*		Husky Stadium; Seattle, WA	L 17–20	60,975	
October 14	at No. 18 Stanford		Stanford Stadium; Stanford, CA	W 34–31	58,079	
October 21	Oregon		Husky Stadium; Seattle, WA (rivalry)	W 20–14	49,602	
October 28	Arizona State		Husky Stadium; Seattle, WA	W 41–7	54,866	
November 4	Arizona	No. 20	Husky Stadium; Seattle, WA	W 31–21	47,587	
November 11	at No. 5 USC	No. 19	Los Angeles Memorial Coliseum; Los Angeles, CA	L 10–28	54,071	
November 25	vs. Washington State		Joe Albi Stadium; Spokane, WA (Apple Cup)	W 38–8	35,187	
*Non-conference game; Rankings from AP Poll released prior to the game; Source:

== Roster ==
1978 Washington Huskies football team roster
Players
Coaches
Offense

Pos.	#	Name	Class
WR		Ron Blacken
WR		Gary Briggs
G	68	Dan Chavira	Jr
RB		Vince Coby
QB	12	Tom Flick	So
G	62	Phil Foreman	Jr
WR	93	Spider Gaines	Sr
FB	42	Ron Gipson	Jr
TE	86	Scott Greenwood (C)	Sr
OT	78	Curt Marsh	So
TE	80	Randy Moraga	Jr
QB	7	Tom Porras	Jr
WR	22	Keith Richardson	Fr
RB		Rob Smith
OL		Joe Stanford
RB	24	Joe Steele	Jr
RB	20	Kyle Stevens	So
OT	63	Jeff Toews (C)	Sr
RB	45	Toussaint Tyler	So
C	56	Tom Turnure	Jr
OT	79	Randy Van Divier	So
OT	70	Roger Westlund	Sr
TE		R Wold

Defense

Pos.	#	Name	Class
LB		Bret Gagliardi
LB		Willy Galoia
CB	23	Nesby Glasgow (C)	Sr
S	46	Greg Grimes	Jr
LB	55	Bruce Harrell	Jr
S	96	Kyle Heinrich	Sr
LB	5	Michael Jackson (C)	Sr
LB	34	John Kerley	Sr
CB	19	Mark Lee	Jr
DT	61	Chris Linnin	Jr
DE	73	Doug Martin	Jr
NG	58	Stafford Mays	Jr
LB	48	Antowaine Richardson	Jr
CB	10	Lance Theoudele	Jr

Special teams

Pos.	#	Name	Class
K	1	Mike Lansford	Jr
P	27	Aaron Wilson	Sr

Head coach

- Don James (4th year)

Coordinators/assistant coaches

- Dick Scesniak – (OC)
- Jim Lambright – (DC)

Legend

- (C) Team captain
- (S) Suspended
- (I) Ineligible
- Injured
- Redshirt

== NFL draft selections ==
Five University of Washington Huskies were selected in the 1979 NFL draft, which lasted 12 rounds with 330 selections.

= Husky Hall of Fame

Player	Position	Round	Overall	Franchise
Jeff Toews	Tackle	2nd	53	Miami Dolphins
Michael Jackson	Linebacker	3rd	57	Seattle Seahawks
Spider Gaines	Wide receiver	6th	140	Kansas City Chiefs
Roger Westlund	Tackle	7th	186	Atlanta Falcons
Nesby Glasgow	Defensive back	8th	207	Baltimore Colts

== Notes ==
- Joe Steele set a new University of Washington record for rushing yards in a season with 1,111 yards. This eclipsed Hugh McElhenny's 1,107 yards from 1950. The record is currently held by Bishop Sankey.
