= Bruce Davis (wide receiver) =

American football player (born 1963)

No. 85, 83
- Position: Wide receiver

Personal information
- Born: February 25, 1963 (age 63); Dallas, Texas, U.S.
- Listed height: 5 ft 8 in (1.73 m)
- Listed weight: 160 lb (73 kg)

Career information
- High school: Franklin D. Roosevelt (Dallas, Texas)
- College: Baylor
- NFL draft: 1984: 2nd round, 50th overall pick

Career history
- Cleveland Browns (1984); Los Angeles Raiders (1985)*; San Diego Chargers (1987); Indianapolis Colts (1988)*
- * Offseason or practice squad member only

Awards and highlights
- Second-team All-SWC (1983)

Career NFL statistics
- Receptions: 7
- Receiving yards: 119
- Receiving touchdowns: 2
- Stats at Pro Football Reference

Bruce Edward Davis (born February 25, 1963) is an American former professional football player who was a wide receiver for the Cleveland Browns of the National Football League (NFL). He was selected by the Browns in the second round of the 1984 NFL draft. He played college football for the Baylor Bears.

Davis also competed for the Baylor Bears track and field team as a sprinter.
