= Phil Francis =

American football player (born 1957)

No. 48
- Position: Running back

Personal information
- Born: January 10, 1957 (age 69); Kewanee, Illinois, U.S.
- Listed height: 6 ft 1 in (1.85 m)
- Listed weight: 205 lb (93 kg)

Career information
- High school: Beaverton (Beaverton, Oregon)
- College: Stanford
- NFL draft: 1979: 7th round, 166th overall pick

Career history
- San Francisco 49ers (1979–1981)

Awards and highlights
- Super Bowl champion (XVI)
- Stats at Pro Football Reference

Phillip Kevin Francis (born January 10, 1957) is an American former professional football running back who played for the San Francisco 49ers of the National Football League (NFL). He played college football for the Stanford Cardinal and was selected by the 49ers in the seventh round of the 1979 NFL draft.

== Early life ==
Phillip Kevin Francis was born on January 10, 1957, in Kewanee, Illinois. He attended Beaverton High School in Beaverton, Oregon.

== College career ==
Francis enrolled at Stanford University to play college football for the Cardinal. He played for the junior varsity team in 1975 and was a three-year varsity letterman from 1976 to 1978. He played in 33 games for Stanford, rushing 261 times for 1,127 yards and ten touchdowns while also catching 88 passes for 679 yards and one touchdown.

== Professional career ==
Francis was selected by the San Francisco 49ers in the seventh round, with the 166th overall pick, of the 1979 NFL draft. He signed with the team on May 17. He played in all 16 games for the 49ers during the 1979 season as a reserve running back, recording 31 carries 118 yards and one touchdown, 32 receptions for 198 yards on 47 targets, seven kick returns for 103 yards, and two fumbles. Francis was placed on injured reserve on October 7, 1980, activated on November 8, and placed on injured reserve again on November 15. He appeared in five games, starting one, overall in 1980, totaling seven rushes for 36 yards, three catches for 23 yards on three targets, and five kick returns for 60 yards.

Francis was placed on injured reserve again on August 25, 1981, and missed the entire 1981 season. On January 24, 1982, the 49ers won Super Bowl XVI. In February 1982, after undergoing his second major knee surgery, Francis retired from pro football at the advice of his doctor.
