= Bruce Beekley =

American football player (born 1956)

No. 58
- Position: Linebacker

Personal information
- Born: December 15, 1956 (age 69); Cincinnati, Ohio, U.S.
- Listed height: 6 ft 2 in (1.88 m)
- Listed weight: 225 lb (102 kg)

Career information
- High school: Woodside (Woodside, California)
- College: Oregon
- NFL draft: 1979: 10th round, 266th overall pick

Career history
- Atlanta Falcons (1979)*; Green Bay Packers (1980); Oakland Raiders (1981)*
- * Offseason or practice squad member only

Awards and highlights
- Second-team All-Pac-10 (1978)

Career NFL statistics
- Games played: 15
- Stats at Pro Football Reference

Bruce Edward Beekley (born December 15, 1956) is a former linebacker in the National Football League (NFL). Beekley was drafted in the tenth round of the 1979 NFL draft by the Atlanta Falcons. He would play the following season with the Green Bay Packers.
