= Larry Braziel =

American football player (born 1954)

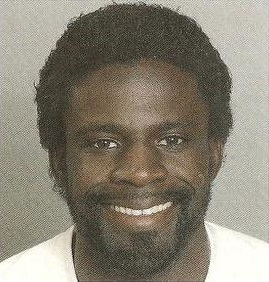

No. 47
- Position: Cornerback

Personal information
- Born: September 25, 1954 (age 72); Fort Worth, Texas, U.S.
- Listed height: 6 ft 0 in (1.83 m)
- Listed weight: 188 lb (85 kg)

Career information
- College: USC
- NFL draft: 1979: 5th round, 115th overall pick

Career history
- Baltimore Colts (1979–1981); Cleveland Browns (1982–1985)

Awards and highlights
- PFWA All-Rookie Team (1979); National champion (1978)

Career NFL statistics
- Interceptions: 11
- Fumble recoveries: 3
- Touchdowns: 2
- Stats at Pro Football Reference

Larry Braziel (born September 25, 1954) is an American former professional football player who was a cornerback for seven seasons in the National Football League (NFL). He played college football for the USC Trojans.
