= 1978 Garden State Bowl =

American college football game

Rutgers Scarlet Knights	Arizona State Sun Devils
(9–2)	(8–3)
18	34
Head coach: Frank R. Burns	Head coach: Frank Kush
	1	2	3	4	Total
Rutgers	10	0	0	8	18
Arizona State	0	7	14	13	34
- Date: December 16, 1978
- Season: 1978
- Stadium: Giants Stadium
- Location: East Rutherford, New Jersey
- MVP: WR John Mistler (Arizona State)
- Attendance: 33,402

The 1978 Garden State Bowl, part of the 1978 bowl game season, took place on December 16, 1978, at Giants Stadium in East Rutherford, New Jersey. The competing teams were the Rutgers Scarlet Knights, which competed as a football independent, and the Arizona State Sun Devils, representing the Pacific-10 Conference (Pac-10). In the inaugural edition of the Garden State Bowl, Arizona State came-from-behind to defeat Rutgers 34–18.

== Background ==
This was the seventh bowl game of the decade for Arizona State, who had finished 3rd in the Pacific-10 Conference. Rutgers began their season with a loss to #3 Penn State 20-17. They did not lose another game for two months, winning nine straight games against teams in the area (such as Bucknell, Connecticut, and Columbia). They lost their final game to Colgate at home, but the Scarlet Knights were still invited to their first ever bowl game, played in their home state of New Jersey.

== Game summary ==
- Rutgers - Dorn 47 yard touchdown run (Startzell kick)
- Rutgers - Startzell 46 yard field goal
- Arizona State - Weathers 14 yard touchdown pass from Malone (Hicks kick)
- Arizona State - Mistler 26 yard touchdown pass from Malone (Hicks kick)
- Arizona State - DeFrance 53 yard touchdown pass from Malone (Hicks kick)
- Arizona State - Malone 1 yard touchdown run (Hicks kick)
- Rutgers - Blackwell 5 yard touchdown run (Blackwell pass to McMichael)
- Arizona State - Malone 4 yard touchdown run (kick failed)

John Mistler caught 7 passes for 148 yards in an MVP effort as the Sun Devils pulled away in the second half.

== Aftermath ==
Rutgers was not invited to another bowl game until 2005, which coincidentally was against the Sun Devils. Arizona State did not reach a bowl game again until 1983.
