= 1978 Stanford Cardinals football team =

American college football season

1978 Stanford Cardinals football

Astro-Bluebonnet Bowl champion

Astro-Bluebonnet Bowl, W 25–22 vs. Georgia
- Conference: Pacific-10 Conference

Ranking
- Coaches: No. 16
- AP: No. 17
- Record: 8–4 (4–3 Pac-10)
- Head coach: Bill Walsh (2nd season)
- Offensive scheme: West Coast
- Home stadium: Stanford Stadium

1978 Pacific-10 Conference football standings
	Conf.					Overall
Team	W		L		T	W		L		T
No. 2 USC $	6	–	1	–	0	12	–	1	–	0
No. 14 UCLA	6	–	2	–	0	8	–	3	–	1
Washington	6	–	2	–	0	7	–	4	–	0
Arizona State	4	–	3	–	0	9	–	3	–	0
No. 17 Stanford	4	–	3	–	0	8	–	4	–	0
California	3	–	4	–	0	6	–	5	–	0
Arizona	3	–	4	–	0	5	–	6	–	0
Oregon	2	–	5	–	0	2	–	9	–	0
Oregon State	2	–	6	–	0	3	–	7	–	1
Washington State	1	–	7	–	0	3	–	7	–	1
$ – Conference champion; Rankings from AP Poll

The 1978 Stanford Cardinals football team represented Stanford University in the Pacific-10 Conference during the 1978 NCAA Division I-A football season. Led by second-year head coach Bill Walsh, the Cardinals were 7–4 in the regular season (4–3 in Pac-10, tied for fourth) and played their home games on campus at Stanford Stadium in Stanford, California. Their four losses were by a combined total of sixteen points.

In the Astro-Bluebonnet Bowl on New Year's Eve, Stanford rallied from a 22-point deficit in the second half to defeat No. 11 Georgia, 25–22. and finished with an 8–4 record and a top twenty ranking.

Less than two weeks later, Walsh departed for the NFL's San Francisco 49ers, and receivers coach Rod Dowhower was promoted. Walsh won three Super Bowls in ten seasons with the Niners, took three years off, and returned to Stanford as head coach in 1992.

== Schedule ==
Date	Opponent	Rank	Site	TV	Result	Attendance	Source
September 9	No. 4 Oklahoma*		Stanford Stadium; Stanford, CA		L 29–35	58,883	
September 16	San Jose State*		Stanford Stadium; Stanford, CA (rivalry)		W 38–9	42,500	
September 23	at Illinois*		Memorial Stadium; Champaign, IL		W 35–10	43,143	
September 30	Tulane*	No. 20	Stanford Stadium; Stanford, CA		W 17–14	40,111	
October 7	at No. 16 UCLA	No. 17	Los Angeles Memorial Coliseum; Los Angeles, CA		L 26–27	54,106	
October 14	Washington	No. 18	Stanford Stadium; Stanford, CA		L 31–34	58,079	
October 21	at Washington State		Martin Stadium; Pullman, WA		W 43–27	27,411	
October 28	Oregon State		Stanford Stadium; Stanford, CA		W 24–6	39,214	
November 4	No. 6 USC		Stanford Stadium; Stanford, CA (rivalry)		L 7–13	84,084	
November 11	at Arizona State		Sun Devil Stadium; Tempe, AZ		W 21–14	51,000	
November 18	at California		California Memorial Stadium; Berkeley, CA (Big Game)		W 30–10	77,880	
December 31	vs. No. 11 Georgia*		Houston Astrodome; Houston, TX (Astro-Bluebonnet Bowl)	Mizlou	W 25–22	34,084	
*Non-conference game; Rankings from Coaches' Poll released prior to the game

== Personnel ==
1978 Stanford Cardinal football team roster
Players
Coaches
Offense

Pos.	#	Name	Class
RB		Billy Anderson
RB		Gordon Banks
TE		Pat Bowe
RB		Jim Brown
QB		Steve Dils
OL		Gene Engle
FB		Phil Francis
OL		Paul Hibler
OL		Brian Holloway
WR		James Lofton
OL		John Macauley
WR		Ken Margerum
WR		Vince Mulroy
RB		Darrin Nelson
TE		Mitch Pleis
OL		Brent Saylor
QB		Turk Schonert
TE		Marty Smith
OL		Jim Stephens
WR		Andre Tyler

Defense

Pos.	#	Name	Class
LB		Kevin Bates
LB		Bo Boxold
LB		Steve Budinger
DB		Keith Burcham
LB		Gordy Ceresino
DB		Robby Chapman
DL		Chuck Evans
DL		Dan Floyd
DB		Steve Foley
LB		Tom Hall
LB		Milt McColl
DB		Rick Parker
DB		John Pigott
LB		Terry Rennaker
DL		Doug Rogers
DB		Kent Stalwick
DB		Savann Thompson
DL		Dean Wilson

Special teams

Pos.	#	Name	Class
P		Brad Fox
K		Ken Naber

Head coach

- Bill Walsh

Coordinators/assistant coaches

- Rod Dowhower (WR)
- Dennis Green (RB)
- George Seifert (DB)
- Norb Hecker (LB)
- Tom Lovat (OL)
- Fred von Appen (DL)

Legend

- (C) Team captain
- (S) Suspended
- (I) Ineligible
- Injured
- Redshirt

== Awards and honors ==
- Steve Dils, Sammy Baugh Trophy

== All-conference ==
Two sophomores were named to the All-Pac-10 team, halfback Darrin Nelson and wide receiver Ken Margerum, along with senior linebacker Gordy Ceresino.

== NFL draft ==
Two Cardinals were selected in the 1979 NFL draft.

Player	Position	Round	Pick	NFL club
Steve Dils	Quarterback	4	97	Minnesota Vikings
Phil Francis	Running back	7	166	San Francisco 49ers
