= 1978 Arizona State Sun Devils football team =

American college football season

1978 Arizona State Sun Devils football

Garden State Bowl champion

Garden State Bowl, W 34–18 vs. Rutgers
- Conference: Pacific-10 Conference

Ranking
- Coaches: No. 19
- Record: 9–3 (4–3 Pac-10)
- Head coach: Frank Kush (21st season)
- Defensive coordinator: Larry Kentera (8th season)
- Home stadium: Sun Devil Stadium

1978 Pacific-10 Conference football standings
	Conf.					Overall
Team	W		L		T	W		L		T
No. 2 USC $	6	–	1	–	0	12	–	1	–	0
No. 14 UCLA	6	–	2	–	0	8	–	3	–	1
Washington	6	–	2	–	0	7	–	4	–	0
Arizona State	4	–	3	–	0	9	–	3	–	0
No. 17 Stanford	4	–	3	–	0	8	–	4	–	0
California	3	–	4	–	0	6	–	5	–	0
Arizona	3	–	4	–	0	5	–	6	–	0
Oregon	2	–	5	–	0	2	–	9	–	0
Oregon State	2	–	6	–	0	3	–	7	–	1
Washington State	1	–	7	–	0	3	–	7	–	1
$ – Conference champion; Rankings from AP Poll

The 1978 Arizona State Sun Devils football team was an American football team that represented Arizona State University in the Pacific-10 Conference (Pac-10) during the 1978 NCAA Division I-A football season. In their 21st season under head coach Frank Kush, the Sun Devils compiled a 9–3 record (4–3 against Pac-10 opponents), finished in a tie for fourth place in the Pac-10, and outscored their opponents by a combined total of 347 to 236.

The team's statistical leaders included Mark Malone with 1,305 passing yards and 705 rushing yards and Chris DeFrance with 617 receiving yards.

== Schedule ==
Date	Opponent	Rank	Site	Result	Attendance	Source
September 9	Pacific (CA)*		Sun Devil Stadium; Tempe, AZ	W 42–7	69,527	
September 16	BYU*		Sun Devil Stadium; Tempe, AZ	W 24–17	70,311	
September 23	at Washington State		Joe Albi Stadium; Spokane, WA	L 26–51	33,507	
September 30	UTEP*		Sun Devil Stadium; Tempe, AZ	W 27–0	69,497	
October 7	at Northwestern*		Dyche Stadium; Evanston, IL	W 56–14	17,009	
October 14	No. 2 USC		Sun Devil Stadium; Tempe, AZ	W 20–7	70,138	
October 28	at Washington	No. 12	Husky Stadium; Seattle, WA	L 7–41	54,866	
November 4	California		Sun Devil Stadium; Tempe, AZ	W 35–21	70,876	
November 11	Stanford		Sun Devil Stadium; Tempe, AZ	L 14–21	51,000	
November 18	at Oregon State		Parker Stadium; Corvallis, OR	W 44–22	23,500	
November 25	Arizona		Arizona Stadium; Tucson, AZ (rivalry)	W 18–17	58,090	
December 16	vs. Rutgers*		Giants Stadium; East Rutherford, NJ (Garden State Bowl)	W 34–18	33,402	
*Non-conference game; Rankings from AP Poll released prior to the game

== Game summaries ==
=== USC ===
Team	1	2	3	4	Total
USC	0	0	0	7	7
• Arizona St	0	3	14	3	20

- Date: October 14
- Location: Sun Devil Stadium
- Game attendance: 71,138

Scoring summary
Q2	ASU	Hicks 40 yard field goal	ASU 3–0
Q3	ASU	Malone 1 yard run (Hicks kick)	ASU 10–0
Q3	ASU	Mistler 16 yard pass from Malone (Hicks kick)	ASU 17–0
Q4	ASU	Hicks 28 yard field goal	ASU 20–0
Q4	USC	Garcia 31 yard pass from McDonald (Jordan kick)	ASU 20–7

- Mark Malone 19 Rush, 141 Yds
- Bob Kohrs 3 Fum Rec

=== Arizona ===
Mark Malone threw a pair of touchdown passes and Bill Zivic's 45-yard field goal attempt missed wide left in the final seconds to secure the Sun Devil victory.

=== Garden State Bowl ===
Garden State Bowl: Arizona State Sun Devils vs. Rutgers Scarlet Knights

Quarter	1	2	3	4	Total
Arizona St	0	7	14	13	34
Rutgers	10	0	0	8	18

at Giants Stadium, East Rutherford, NJ

- Date: December 16
- Game attendance: 33,402
- 2018 Arizona State football media guide

Game information

Arizona St

Rutgers

MVP: John Mistler

Scoring summary

Quarter	Time	Drive			Team	Scoring information	Score	
Quarter	Time	Plays	Yards	TOP	Team	Scoring information	ASU	RU
1					Rutgers	Dorn 47-yard touchdown run, Startzell kick good	0	7
1					Rutgers	46-yard field goal by Startzell	0	10
2					Arizona St	Weathers 14-yard touchdown reception from Malone, Hicks kick good	7	10
3					Arizona St	Mistler 26-yard touchdown reception from Malone, Hicks kick good	14	10
3					Arizona St	DeFrance 53-yard touchdown reception from Malone, Hicks kick good	21	10
4					Arizona St	Malone 1-yard touchdown run, Hicks kick good	28	10
4					Rutgers	Blackwell 5-yard touchdown run, 2-point pass good	28	18
4					Arizona St	Malone 4-yard touchdown run, kick no good	34	18
"TOP" = time of possession. For other American football terms, see Glossary of American football.							34	18

== Personnel ==
1978 Arizona State Sun Devils football team roster
Players
Coaches
Offense

Pos.	#	Name	Class
		Chris DeFrance
QB		Mark Malone

Defense

Pos.	#	Name	Class
DE		Al Harris (C)
DE	95	Bob Kohrs	Jr
LB		Jeff McIntyre	Sr

Special teams

Pos.	#	Name	Class

Head coach

- Frank Kush

Coordinators/assistant coaches

Legend

- (C) Team captain
- (S) Suspended
- (I) Ineligible
- Injured
- Redshirt
