= 1978 USC Trojans football team =

American college football season

1978 USC Trojans football

Coaches Poll national champion Pac-10 champion Rose Bowl champion

Rose Bowl, W 17–10 vs. Michigan
- Conference: Pacific-10 Conference

Ranking
- Coaches: No. 1
- AP: No. 2
- Record: 12–1 (6–1 Pac-10)
- Head coach: John Robinson (3rd season)
- Captains: Lynn Cain; Rich Dimler
- Home stadium: Los Angeles Memorial Coliseum

1978 Pacific-10 Conference football standings
	Conf.					Overall
Team	W		L		T	W		L		T
No. 2 USC $	6	–	1	–	0	12	–	1	–	0
No. 14 UCLA	6	–	2	–	0	8	–	3	–	1
Washington	6	–	2	–	0	7	–	4	–	0
Arizona State	4	–	3	–	0	9	–	3	–	0
No. 17 Stanford	4	–	3	–	0	8	–	4	–	0
California	3	–	4	–	0	6	–	5	–	0
Arizona	3	–	4	–	0	5	–	6	–	0
Oregon	2	–	5	–	0	2	–	9	–	0
Oregon State	2	–	6	–	0	3	–	7	–	1
Washington State	1	–	7	–	0	3	–	7	–	1
$ – Conference champion; Rankings from AP Poll

The 1978 USC Trojans football team represented the University of Southern California in the 1978 NCAA Division I-A football season. Following the season, the Trojans were crowned national champions according to the Coaches Poll. While Alabama claimed the AP Poll title because it had defeated top-ranked Penn State in the Sugar Bowl, the Trojans felt they deserved the title since they had defeated Alabama and Notre Dame during the regular season, and then Michigan in the Rose Bowl. Both USC and Alabama ended their seasons with a single loss.

This would be the last national championship won by the Trojans until 2003.

== Schedule ==
Date	Opponent	Rank	Site	TV	Result	Attendance	Source
September 9	Texas Tech*	No. 9	Los Angeles Memorial Coliseum; Los Angeles, CA		W 17–9	50,321	
September 16	at Oregon	No. 8	Autzen Stadium; Eugene, OR		W 37–10	31,000	
September 23	at No. 1 Alabama*	No. 7	Legion Field; Birmingham, AL	ABC	W 24–14	77,313	
September 29	Michigan State*	No. 3	Los Angeles Memorial Coliseum; Los Angeles, CA		W 30–9	65,319	
October 14	at Arizona State	No. 2	Sun Devil Stadium; Tempe, AZ		L 7–20	70,138	
October 21	Oregon State^{†}	No. 7	Los Angeles Memorial Coliseum; Los Angeles, CA		W 38–7	53,734	
October 28	California	No. 6	Los Angeles Memorial Coliseum; Los Angeles, CA		W 42–17	56,954	
November 4	at Stanford	No. 6	Stanford Stadium; Stanford, CA (rivalry)		W 13–7	84,084	
November 11	No. 19 Washington	No. 5	Los Angeles Memorial Coliseum; Los Angeles, CA		W 28–10	54,071	
November 18	at No. 14 UCLA	No. 5	Los Angeles Memorial Coliseum; Los Angeles, CA (Victory Bell)	ABC	W 17–10	90,387	
November 25	No. 8 Notre Dame*	No. 3	Los Angeles Memorial Coliseum; Los Angeles, CA (rivalry)	ABC	W 27–25	84,256	
December 2	at Hawaii*	No. 3	Aloha Stadium; Halawa, HI		W 21–5	48,767	
January 1, 1979	vs. No. 5 Michigan*	No. 3	Rose Bowl; Pasadena, CA (Rose Bowl)	NBC	W 17–10	105,629	
*Non-conference game; ^{†}Homecoming; Rankings from AP Poll released prior to the game; Source:

== Game summaries ==
=== Notre Dame ===
Team	1	2	3	4	Total
Notre Dame	3	0	3	19	25
• USC	6	11	7	3	27

- Date: November 25
- Location: Los Angeles Memorial Coliseum, Los Angeles
- Game attendance: 84,256

Scoring summary
1		USC	Williams 50-yard pass from McDonald (kick failed)	USC 6–0
1		ND	Unis 47-yard field goal	USC 6–3
2		USC	Garcia 35-yard pass from McDonald (McDonald to Hunter pass)	USC 14–3
2		USC	Jordan 39-yard field goal	USC 17–3
3		ND	Unis 26-yard field goal	USC 17–6
3	7:38	USC	White 1-yard run (Jordan kick)	USC 24–6
4	12:26	ND	Haines 57-yard pass from Montana (pass failed)	USC 24–12
4	3:01	ND	Buchanan 1-yard run (Unis kick)	USC 24–19
4	0:46	ND	Holohan 2-yard pass from Montana (pass failed)	ND 25–24
4	0:02	USC	Jordan 37-yard field goal	USC 27–25

=== Rose Bowl ===
Rose Bowl: Michigan Wolverines vs. USC Trojans

Quarter	1	2	3	4	Total
Michigan	0	3	7	0	10
USC	7	10	0	0	17

at Rose Bowl, Pasadena, California

- Date: January 1
- Game attendance: 105,629
- TV announcers (NBC): Curt Gowdy, John Brodie, and O.J. Simpson
- Recap/Box

Game information

First quarter

- USC – Hoby Brenner 9-yard pass from Paul McDonald (Frank Jordan kick). USC 7–0. Drive:

Second quarter

- MICH – Gregg Willner 36-yard field goal. USC 7–3. Drive:
- USC – Charles White 3-yard run (Frank Jordan kick). USC 14–3. Drive:
- USC – Frank Jordan 35-yard field goal. USC 17–3. Drive:

Third quarter

- MICH – R. Smith 44-yard pass from Rick Leach (Gregg Willner kick). USC 17–10. Drive:

Top passers

- MICH – Rick Leach – 10/21, 137 yards, TD, 2 INT
- USC – Paul McDonald – 4/9, 23 yards, TD

Top rushers

- MICH – Russell Davis – 8 rushes, 28 yards
- USC – Charles White – 32 rushes, 99 yards, TD

Top receivers

- MICH – Roosevelt Smith – 4 receptions, 58 yards, TD
- USC – Dan Garcia – 1 reception, 12 yards

== Roster ==
1978 USC Trojans football team roster
Players
Coaches
Offense

Pos.	#	Name	Class
RB		Marcus Allen	Fr
TE		Hoby Brenner	So
OL		Brad Budde	Jr
WR		Ray Butler	Jr
RB	21	Lynn Cain (C)	Sr
RB		Paul DiLulo
RB		Dwight Ford
WR		Dan Garcia
WR		Michael Hayes
OL		Pat Howell
TE		James Hunter
QB		Paul McDonald	Jr
OL		Anthony Muñoz	Jr
OL		Otis Page
OL		Ray Peters
QB		Rob Preston
TE		Vic Rakhshani
QB		Walt Ransom
WR		Calvin Sweeney	Sr
OL		Keith Van Horne	So
RB		Charles White	Jr
WR		Kevin Williams	So

Defense

Pos.	#	Name	Class
DL		Chip Banks	Fr
DB	47	Larry Braziel	Sr
DL		Gary Cobb
DB		Willie Crawford
DL	92	Rich Dimler (C)	Sr
DL		Dennis Edwards
LB		Riki Ellison
DB		Carter Hartwig	Sr
LB	56	Dennis Johnson	Sr
DT	96	Myron Lapka	Sr
DB		Tim Lavender
S	42	Ronnie Lott	So
LB	58	Mike McDonald	Jr
LB	57	Larry McGrew	Jr
LB		Charlie Moses
LB		Eric Scoggins
DB		Dennis Smith	So
DL		Ty Sperling
DB		Herb Ward

Special teams

Pos.	#	Name	Class
K		Frank Jordan
P		Marty King

Head coach

- John Robinson

Coordinators/assistant coaches

Legend

- (C) Team captain
- (S) Suspended
- (I) Ineligible
- Injured
- Redshirt

== 1978 Trojans in the NFL ==
All 22 starters played in the NFL.

- Marcus Allen
- Chip Banks
- Lynn Cain
- Rich Dimler
- Ronnie Lott
- Anthony Muñoz
- Charles White
- Brad Budde
- Garry Cobb
- Larry Braziel
- Paul McDonald
- Riki Gray
- Ray Butler
- Steve Busick
- Keith Van Horne
- Dennis Smith
- Allen, Lott, and Muñoz are the only three starters on the team enshrined in the Pro Football Hall of Fame.
