= 1978 UCLA Bruins football team =

American college football season

1978 UCLA Bruins football

Fiesta Bowl, T 10–10 vs. Arkansas
- Conference: Pacific-10 Conference

Ranking
- Coaches: No. 12
- AP: No. 14
- Record: 8–3–1 (6–2 Pac-10)
- Head coach: Terry Donahue (3rd season)
- Defensive coordinator: Jed Hughes (2nd season)
- Home stadium: Los Angeles Memorial Coliseum

1978 Pacific-10 Conference football standings
	Conf.					Overall
Team	W		L		T	W		L		T
No. 2 USC $	6	–	1	–	0	12	–	1	–	0
No. 14 UCLA	6	–	2	–	0	8	–	3	–	1
Washington	6	–	2	–	0	7	–	4	–	0
Arizona State	4	–	3	–	0	9	–	3	–	0
No. 17 Stanford	4	–	3	–	0	8	–	4	–	0
California	3	–	4	–	0	6	–	5	–	0
Arizona	3	–	4	–	0	5	–	6	–	0
Oregon	2	–	5	–	0	2	–	9	–	0
Oregon State	2	–	6	–	0	3	–	7	–	1
Washington State	1	–	7	–	0	3	–	7	–	1
$ – Conference champion; Rankings from AP Poll

The 1978 UCLA Bruins football team represented the University of California, Los Angeles during the 1978 NCAA Division I-A football season. The Pacific-8 Conference became the Pacific-10 Conference by adding Arizona and Arizona State to the league. This was Terry Donahue's third season as head coach of the Bruins.

== Schedule ==
Date	Opponent	Rank	Site	TV	Result	Attendance	Source
September 9	at No. 11 Washington	No. 12	Husky Stadium; Seattle, WA	ABC	W 10–7	55,780	
September 16	at Tennessee*	No. 9	Neyland Stadium; Knoxville, TN		W 13–0	85,897	
September 23	at Kansas*	No. 8	Memorial Stadium; Lawrence, KS		L 24–28	43,120	
September 30	Minnesota*	No. 18	Los Angeles Memorial Coliseum; Los Angeles, CA		W 17–3	40,369	
October 7	No. 17 Stanford	No. 16	Los Angeles Memorial Coliseum; Los Angeles, CA		W 27–26	54,106	
October 14	Washington State	No. 14	Los Angeles Memorial Coliseum; Los Angeles, CA		W 45–31	40,023	
October 21	at California	No. 10	California Memorial Stadium; Berkeley, CA (rivalry)	ABC	W 45–0	62,500	
October 27	Arizona	No. 10	Los Angeles Memorial Coliseum; Los Angeles, CA		W 24–14	41,077	
November 4	Oregon	No. 9	Los Angeles Memorial Coliseum; Los Angeles, CA		W 23–21	37,314	
November 11	at Oregon State	No. 9	Parker Stadium; Corvallis, OR		L 13–15	28,000	
November 18	No. 5 USC	No. 14	Los Angeles Memorial Coliseum; Los Angeles, CA (Victory Bell)		L 10–17	90,387	
December 25	vs. No. 8 Arkansas*	No. 15	Sun Devil Stadium; Tempe, AZ (Fiesta Bowl)	NBC	T 10-10	55,202	
*Non-conference game; Rankings from AP Poll released prior to the game

== Personnel ==
1978 UCLA Bruins football team roster
Players
Coaches
Offense

Pos.	#	Name	Class
QB		Rick Bashore
WR		Michael Brant
TE		Kent Brisbin
RB		Theotis Brown
QB		Steve Bukich
RB		Glen Cannon
OL		Bruce Davis
OL		Larry Lee
OL		Jim Main
RB		Freeman McNeil
OL		Curt Mohl
OL		Max Montoyo
RB		Marvin Morris
OL		Dave Otey
RB		James Owens
WR		Severn Reece
OL		Scott Reid
OL		Luis Sharpe
WR		Dokie Williams
TE		Tim Wrightman

Defense

Pos.	#	Name	Class
LB		Arthur Akers
DB		Brian Baggott
DB		Kenny Easley
LB		Chris Elias
DB		Dave Gomer
DL		Don Hopwood
DB		Bobby Hosea
DL		Billy Don Jackson
DB		Johnny Lynn
DB		Michael Molina
LB		Jeff Muro
LB		Brad Plemmons
LB		Jerry Robinson
DL		Raymond Robinson
DB		Scott Stauch
DL		Manu Tuiasosopo
DL		Mark Tuinei
DB		Jimmy Turner
LB		Glenn Windom

Special teams

Pos.	#	Name	Class
K		Peter Boermeester
P		Matt McFarland

Head coach

- Terry Donahue

Coordinators/assistant coaches

Legend

- (C) Team captain
- (S) Suspended
- (I) Ineligible
- Injured
- Redshirt

Roster
Last update: 2026–Jan–04

== Awards and honors ==
- All-American: Kenny Easley (S, consensus), Jerry Robinson (LB, consensus), Manu Tuiasosopo (DT, second team)
