= 1978 NCAA Division I-A football rankings =

- Season: 1978
- Bowl season: 1978–79 bowl games
- Preseason No. 1: Alabama
- End of season champions: Alabama (AP); USC (Coaches)

Two human polls comprised the 1978 National Collegiate Athletic Association (NCAA) Division I-A football rankings. Unlike most sports, college football's governing body, the NCAA, does not bestow a national championship, instead that title is bestowed by one or more different polling agencies. There are two main weekly polls that begin in the preseason—the AP Poll and the Coaches Poll.

== Legend ==
	Increase in ranking
	Decrease in ranking
	Not ranked previous week
	National champion
(#–#)	Win–loss record
(Italics)	Number of first place votes
т	Tied with team above or below also with this symbol

== AP Poll ==
	Preseason Preseason	Week 1 Sep 11	Week 2 Sep 18	Week 3 Sep 25	Week 4 Oct 2	Week 5 Oct 9	Week 6 Oct 16	Week 7 Oct 23	Week 8 Oct 30	Week 9 Nov 6	Week 10 Nov 13	Week 11 Nov 20	Week 12 Nov 27	Week 13 Dec 4	Week 14 (Final) Final	
1.	Alabama (31)	Alabama (1–0)	Alabama (2–0)	Oklahoma (3–0)	Oklahoma (4–0)	Oklahoma (5–0)	Oklahoma (6–0)	Oklahoma (7–0)	Oklahoma (8–0)	Oklahoma (9–0)	Penn State (10–0)	Penn State (10–0)	Penn State (11–0)	Penn State (11–0)	Alabama (11–1) (38)	1.
2.	Arkansas (13)	Arkansas (0–0)	Arkansas (1–0)	Arkansas (2–0)	USC (4–0)	USC (4–0)	Penn State (6–0)	Penn State (7–0)	Penn State (8–0)	Penn State (9–0)	Nebraska (9–1)	Alabama (9–1)	Alabama (9–1)	Alabama (10–1)	USC (12–1) (19)	2.
3.	Penn State (5)	Oklahoma (1–0)	Oklahoma (2–0) т	USC (3–0)	Michigan (3–0)	Arkansas (4–0) т	Arkansas (4–0)	Alabama (6–1)	Alabama (7–1)	Alabama (8–1)	Alabama (9–1)	USC (9–1)	USC (10–1)	USC (11–1)	Oklahoma (11–1) (1)	3.
4.	Oklahoma (1)	Michigan (0–0)	Penn State (3–0) т	Michigan (2–0)	Arkansas (3–0)	Penn State (6–0) т	Alabama (5–1)	Nebraska (6–1)	Nebraska (7–1)	Nebraska (8–1)	Oklahoma (9–1)	Oklahoma (10–1)	Oklahoma (10–1)	Oklahoma (10–1)	Penn State (11–1)	4.
5.	Notre Dame (9)	Penn State (2–0)	Michigan (1–0)	Penn State (4–0)	Penn State (5–0)	Michigan (4–0)	Nebraska (5–1)	Maryland (7–0)	Maryland (8–0)	USC (7–1)	USC (8–1)	Houston (8–1)	Michigan (10–1)	Michigan (10–1)	Michigan (10–2)	5.
6.	Michigan	Ohio State (0–0)	Texas (1–0)	Texas (2–0)	Texas (3–0)	Texas A&M (4–0)	Maryland (6–0)	USC (5–1)	USC (6–1)	Texas (6–1)	Houston (8–1)	Michigan (9–1)	Nebraska (9–2)	Nebraska (9–2)	Clemson (11–1)	6.
7.	Ohio State	Texas (0–0)	USC (2–0)	Alabama (2–1)	Texas A&M (3–0)	Alabama (4–1)	USC (4–1)	Texas (5–1)	Texas (6–1)	Michigan (7–1)	Michigan (8–1)	Nebraska (9–2)	Clemson (10–1)	Clemson (10–1)	Notre Dame (9–3)	7.
8.	Texas (1)	USC (1–0)	UCLA (2–0)	Texas A&M (2–0)	Alabama (3–1)	Nebraska (4–1)	Texas (4–1)	Michigan (5–1)	Michigan (6–1)	Houston (7–1)	Georgia (8–1)	Notre Dame (8–2)	Arkansas (8–2)	Arkansas (9–2)	Nebraska (9–3)	8.
9.	USC (2)	UCLA (1–0)	Texas A&M (1–0)	Pittsburgh (2–0)	Pittsburgh (3–0)	Pittsburgh (4–0)	Michigan (4–1)	Arkansas (4–1)	UCLA (7–1)	UCLA (8–1)	Texas (6–2)	Texas (7–2)	Houston (8–2)	Houston (9–2)	Texas (9–3)	9.
10.	Nebraska	Texas A&M (1–0)	LSU (1–0)	Florida State (3–0)	Nebraska (3–1)	Maryland (5–0)	UCLA (5–1)	UCLA (6–1)	Houston (6–1)	LSU (6–1)	Notre Dame (7–2)	Clemson (9–1)	Notre Dame (8–3)	Notre Dame (8–3)	Houston (9–3)	10.
11.	Washington	Missouri (1–0)	Pittsburgh (1–0)	LSU (2–0)	LSU (3–0)	LSU (4–0)	Houston (4–1)	Houston (5–1)	Navy (7–0)	Georgia (7–1)	Maryland (9–1)	Arkansas (7–2)	Georgia (8–1–1)	Georgia (9–1–1)	Arkansas (9–2–1)	11.
12.	UCLA	Nebraska (1–1)	Nebraska (2–1)	Nebraska (2–1)	Maryland (4–0)	Texas (3–1)	Texas A&M (4–1)	Arizona State (5–1)	LSU (5–1)	Purdue (7–1)	Clemson (8–1)	Georgia (8–1–1)	Michigan State (8–3)	Michigan State (8–3)	Michigan State (8–3)	12.
13.	LSU	LSU (0–0)	Florida State (2–0)	Ohio State (1–1)	Colorado (4–0)	Colorado (5–0)	Missouri (4–2)	Missouri (5–2)	Georgia (6–1)	Maryland (8–1)	Arkansas (6–2)	Maryland (9–2)	Maryland (9–2)	Maryland (9–2)	Purdue (9–2–1)	13.
14.	Pittsburgh	Pittsburgh (0–0)	Notre Dame (0–1)	Missouri (2–1)	Ohio State (2–1)	UCLA (4–1)	Arizona State (5–1)	LSU (5–1)	Purdue (6–1)	Notre Dame (6–2)	UCLA (8–2)	Michigan State (7–3)	Texas (7–3)	Texas (8–3)	UCLA (8–3–1)	14.
15.	Kentucky	Notre Dame (0–1)	Washington (1–1)	Maryland (3–0)	Iowa State (4–0)	Florida State (4–1)	Pittsburgh (4–1)	Pittsburgh (5–1)	Notre Dame (5–2)	Clemson (7–1)	Purdue (7–1–1)	Pittsburgh (8–2)	UCLA (8–3)	UCLA (8–3)	Missouri (8–4)	15.
16.	Texas A&M (1)	Florida State (1–0)	Ohio State (0–1)	Colorado (3–0)	UCLA (3–1)	Ohio State (2–1–1)	LSU (4–1)	Georgia (5–1)	Clemson (6–1)	Arkansas (5–2)	Michigan State (6–3)	Ohio State (7–2–1)	Pittsburgh (8–3)	Pittsburgh (8–3)	Georgia (9–2–1)	16.
17.	Florida State	Kentucky (0–0)	Missouri (1–1)	Iowa State (3–0)	Stanford (3–1)	Houston (3–1)	Navy (5–0)	Purdue (5–1)	Arkansas (4–2)	Michigan State (5–3)	LSU (6–2)	UCLA (8–3)	Purdue (8–2–1)	Purdue (8–2–1)	Stanford (8–4)	17.
18.	Clemson	Washington (0–1)	Maryland (2–0)	UCLA (2–1)	Florida State (3–1)	Stanford (3–2)	Georgia (4–1)	Navy (6–0)	Michigan State (4–3)	Navy (7–1)	Pittsburgh (7–2)	Purdue (7–2–1)	Missouri (7–4)	Missouri (7–4)	NC State (9–3)	18.
19.	North Carolina	Iowa State (1–0)	Colorado (2–0)	Georgia (2–0)	Auburn (3–0)	Missouri (3–2)	Purdue (4–1)	Notre Dame (4–2)	Pittsburgh (5–2)	Washington (6–3)	Ohio State (6–2–1)	Missouri (7–4)	Iowa State (8–3)	Iowa State (8–3)	Texas A&M (8–4)	19.
20.	Iowa State	Maryland (1–0)	Iowa State (2–0)	Stanford (2–1)	NC State (4–0)	Iowa State (4–1)	Notre Dame (3–2)	Clemson (5–1)	Washington (5–3)	Pittsburgh (6–2)	Georgia Tech (7–2)	Iowa State (8–3)	Ohio State (7–3–1)	Ohio State (7–3–1)	Maryland (9–3)	20.
	Preseason Preseason	Week 1 Sep 11	Week 2 Sep 18	Week 3 Sep 25	Week 4 Oct 2	Week 5 Oct 9	Week 6 Oct 16	Week 7 Oct 23	Week 8 Oct 30	Week 9 Nov 6	Week 10 Nov 13	Week 11 Nov 20	Week 12 Nov 27	Week 13 Dec 4	Week 14 (Final) Final	
		Dropped: Clemson; North Carolina	Dropped: Kentucky	Dropped: Notre Dame; Washington	Dropped: Missouri; Georgia	Dropped: Auburn; NC State	Dropped: Colorado; Florida State; Ohio State; Stanford; Iowa State	Dropped: Texas A&M	Dropped: Arizona State; Missouri	None	Dropped: Navy; Washington	Dropped: LSU; Georgia Tech	None	None	Dropped: Pittsburgh; Iowa State; Ohio State	

== Coaches Poll ==
	Preseason	Week 1 Sep 9	Week 2 Sep 16	Week 3 Sep 23	Week 4 Sep 30	Week 5 Oct 7	Week 6 Oct 14	Week 7 Oct 21	Week 8 Oct 28	Week 9 Nov 4	Week 10 Nov 11	Week 11 Nov 18	Week 12 Nov 25	Week 13 Dec 2	Week 14 (Final) Jan 2	
1.	Alabama (18)	Alabama (1–0) (30)	Alabama (2–0) (34)	Oklahoma (3–0) (25)	Oklahoma (4–0) (29)	Oklahoma (5–0) (35)	Oklahoma (6–0) (31)	Oklahoma (7–0) (32)	Oklahoma (8–0) (32)	Oklahoma (9–0) (34)	Penn State (10–0) (32)	Penn State (10–0) (39)	Penn State (11–0) (30)	Penn State (11–0) (31)	USC (12–1) (15)	1.
2.	Oklahoma (4)	Oklahoma (1–0) (4)	Oklahoma (2–0) (4)	USC (3–0) (7)	USC (4–0) (11)	USC (4–0) (5)	Penn State (6–0) (10)	Penn State (7–0) (7)	Penn State (8–0) (7)	Penn State (9–0) (6)	Nebraska (9–1) (5)	Alabama (9–1)	Alabama (9–1)	Alabama (10–1)	Alabama (11–1) (15)	2.
3.	Penn State (3)	Arkansas (0–0) (2)	Arkansas (1–0) (1)	Michigan (2–0) (3)	Michigan (3–0) (1)	Penn State (6–0) (1)	Arkansas (4–0)	Alabama (6–1)	Alabama (7–1)	Alabama (8–1)	Alabama (9–1) (2)	Oklahoma (10–1)	USC (10–1) (3)	USC (11–1) (3)	Oklahoma (11–1) (5)	3.
4.	Notre Dame (6)	Michigan (0–0) (1)	Penn State (1–0) (3)	Arkansas (2–0) (3)	Penn State (5–0) (1)	Michigan (4–0)	Alabama (5–1)	Nebraska (6–1)	Nebraska (7–1)	Nebraska (8–1)	Oklahoma (9–1)	USC (9–1) (1)	Oklahoma (10–1)	Oklahoma (10–1)	Penn State (11–1)	4.
5.	Arkansas (3)	USC (1–0)	Michigan (1–0) (1)	Penn State (4–0) (1)	Arkansas (3–0)	Arkansas (4–0)	Nebraska (5–1)	Maryland (7–0)	Maryland (8–0)	USC (7–1)	USC (8–1)	Houston (8–1)	Michigan (10–1) (1)	Michigan (10–1) (1)	Michigan (10–2)	5.
6.	Michigan	Ohio State (0–0)	Texas (1–0)	Texas (2–0)	Texas (3–0)	Texas A&M (4–0)	Maryland (6–0)	USC (5–1)	USC (6–1)	Texas (6–1)	Houston (8–1)	Michigan (9–1)	Nebraska (9–2)	Nebraska (9–2)	Clemson (11–1) т	6.
7.	USC (1)	Texas (0–0)	USC (2–0)	Alabama (2–1)	Texas A&M (3–0)	Alabama (4–1)	USC (4–1)	Texas (5–1)	Texas (6–1)	Michigan (7–1)	Michigan (8–1)	Nebraska (9–2)	Clemson (10–1)	Georgia (9–1–1)	Notre Dame (9–3) т	7.
8.	Ohio State (1)	Penn State (2–0)	UCLA (2–0)	Texas A&M (2–0)	Alabama (3–1)	Nebraska (4–1)	Texas (4–1)	UCLA (6–1)	Houston (6–1)	Houston (7–1)	Georgia (8–1)	Notre Dame (8–2)	Georgia (8–1–1)	Clemson (10–1)	Nebraska (9–3)	8.
9.	Texas	UCLA (1–0)	Pittsburgh (1–0)	Florida State (3–0)	Pittsburgh (3–0)	Pittsburgh (4–0)	Michigan (4–1)	Michigan (5–1)	Michigan (6–1)	UCLA (8–1)	Texas (6–2)	Texas (7–2)	Notre Dame (8–3)	Notre Dame (8–3)	Texas (9–3)	9.
10.	Nebraska	Missouri (1–0)	Texas A&M (1–0)	Pittsburgh (2–0)	Nebraska (3–1)	LSU (4–0)	Arkansas (5–0)	Houston (5–1)	UCLA (7–1)	Georgia (7–1)	Notre Dame (7–2)	Clemson (9–1)	Arkansas (8–2)	Arkansas (9–2)	Arkansas (9–2–1)	10.
11.	Washington	Texas A&M (1–0)	LSU (1–0)	LSU (2–0)	LSU (3–0)	Maryland (5–0)	Houston (4–1)	Arkansas (4–1)	Navy (7–0)	LSU (6–1)	Maryland (9–1)	Georgia (8–1–1)	Houston (8–2)	Houston (9–2)	Houston (9–3)	11.
12.	UCLA	Pittsburgh (0–0)	Nebraska (2–1)	Nebraska (2–1)	Colorado (4–0)	Colorado (5–0)	Arizona State (5–1)	Arizona State (5–1)	Georgia (6–1)	Purdue (7–1)	Clemson (8–1)	Arkansas (7–2)	Maryland (9–2)	Maryland (9–2)	UCLA (8–3–1)	12.
13.	LSU	LSU (0–0)	Florida State (2–0)	Maryland (3–0)	Maryland (4–0)	Texas (3–1)	LSU (4–1)	Georgia (5–1)	LSU (5–1)	Notre Dame (6–2)	Arkansas (6–2)	Pittsburgh (8–2)	Pittsburgh (8–3)	Pittsburgh (8–3)	Purdue (9–2–1)	13.
14.	Pittsburgh	Nebraska (1–1)	Notre Dame (0–1)	Colorado (3–0)	Ohio State (2–1)	UCLA (4–1)	Texas A&M (4–1)	LSU (5–1)	Purdue (6–1)	Maryland (8–1)	LSU (6–2)	Ohio State (7–2–1)	Purdue (8–2–1)	Texas (8–3)	Missouri (8–4)	14.
15.	Texas A&M	Florida State (1–0)	Colorado (2–0)	Ohio State (1–1)	Iowa State (4–0)	Missouri (3–2)	Pittsburgh (4–1)	Pittsburgh (5–1)	Notre Dame (5–2)	Clemson (7–1)	UCLA (8–2)	UCLA (8–3)	UCLA (8–3)	Missouri (7–4)	Georgia (9–2–1)	15.
16.	Florida State	Notre Dame (0–1)	Maryland (2–0)	Iowa State (3–0)	UCLA (3–1)	Houston (3–1)	Georgia (4–1)	Missouri (5–2)	Clemson (6–1)	Arkansas (5–2)	Purdue (7–1–1)	Maryland (9–2)	Missouri (7–4)	UCLA (8–3)	Stanford (8–4)	16.
17.	Kentucky	Maryland (1–0)	Washington (1–1)	Missouri (2–1)	Houston (2–1)	Florida State (4–1)	Missouri (4–2)	Purdue (5–1)	Arkansas (4–2)	Washington (6–3)	Ohio State (6–2–1)	Missouri (7–4)	Texas (7–3)	Purdue (8–2–1)	Navy (9–3)	17.
18.	North Carolina	Kentucky (0–0)	Clemson (1–0)	Kentucky (1–0–1)	Stanford (3–1)	Utah State (5–0)	Notre Dame (3–2)	Navy (6–0)	Colorado (6–2)	Navy (7–1)	Pittsburgh (7–2)	Stanford (7–4)	LSU (7–3)	LSU (8–3)	Texas A&M (8–4)	18.
19.	Iowa State	Washington (0–1)	Ohio State (0–1)	Stanford (2–1)	NC State (4–0)	Navy (4–0)	Purdue (4–1)	Notre Dame (4–2)	Georgia Tech (6–2)	Georgia Tech (6–2)	Georgia Tech (7–2)	Purdue (7–2–1)	Stanford (7–4)	Georgia Tech (7–4)	Arizona State (9–3) т	19.
20.	Maryland	Colorado (1–0)	Arizona State (2–0)	Purdue (2–0)	Auburn (3–0)	Stanford (3–2)	Navy (5–0)	Clemson (5–1)	Ohio State (4–2–1)	Pittsburgh (6–2)	Stanford (6–4) т; Iowa State (7–3) т	Iowa State (8–3)	Ohio State (7–3–1)	Stanford (7–4)	NC State (9–3) т	20.
	Preseason	Week 1 Sep 9	Week 2 Sep 16	Week 3 Sep 23	Week 4 Sep 30	Week 5 Oct 7	Week 6 Oct 14	Week 7 Oct 21	Week 8 Oct 28	Week 9 Nov 4	Week 10 Nov 11	Week 11 Nov 18	Week 12 Nov 25	Week 13 Dec 2	Week 14 (Final) Jan 2	
		Dropped: North Carolina; Iowa State	Dropped: Missouri; Kentucky	Dropped: UCLA; Notre Dame; Washington; Clemson; Arizona State	Dropped: Florida State; Missouri; Kentucky; Purdue	Dropped: Ohio State; Iowa State; NC State; Auburn	Dropped: Colorado; Florida State; Utah State; Stanford	Dropped: Texas A&M	Dropped: Arizona State; Pittsburgh; Missouri	Dropped: Colorado; Ohio State	Dropped: Washington; Navy	Dropped: LSU; Georgia Tech	Dropped: Iowa State	Dropped: Ohio State	Dropped: Maryland; Pittsburgh; LSU; Georgia Tech	
