= 1979 Kansas State Wildcats football team =

American college football season

1979 Kansas State Wildcats football
- Conference: Big Eight Conference
- Record: 3–8 (1–6 Big 8)
- Head coach: Jim Dickey (2nd season)
- Defensive coordinator: Gary Darnell (2nd season)
- Home stadium: KSU Stadium

1979 Big Eight Conference football standings
	Conf.					Overall
Team	W		L		T	W		L		T
No. 3 Oklahoma $	7	–	0	–	0	11	–	1	–	0
No. 9 Nebraska	6	–	1	–	0	10	–	2	–	0
Oklahoma State	5	–	2	–	0	7	–	4	–	0
Missouri	3	–	4	–	0	7	–	5	–	0
Colorado	2	–	5	–	0	3	–	8	–	0
Iowa State	2	–	5	–	0	3	–	8	–	0
Kansas	2	–	5	–	0	3	–	8	–	0
Kansas State	1	–	6	–	0	3	–	8	–	0
$ – Conference champion; Rankings from AP Poll

The 1979 Kansas State Wildcats football team represented Kansas State University in the 1979 NCAA Division I-A football season. The team's head football coach was Jim Dickey. The Wildcats played their home games in KSU Stadium. 1979 saw the wildcats finish with a record of 3–8, and a 1–6 record in Big Eight Conference play.

== Schedule ==
Date	Opponent	Site	Result	Attendance	Source
September 15	at Auburn*	Jordan-Hare Stadium; Auburn, AL	L 18–26	50,132	
September 22	Oregon State*	KSU Stadium; Manhattan, KS	W 22–16	32,600	
September 29	at Air Force*	Falcon Stadium; Colorado Springs, CO	W 19–6	22,200	
October 6	Tulsa*	KSU Stadium; Manhattan, KS	L 6–9	33,100	
October 13	Iowa State^{†}	KSU Stadium; Manhattan, KS (rivalry)	L 3–7	23,400	
October 20	No. 8 Oklahoma	KSU Stadium; Manhattan, KS	L 6–38	27,257	
October 27	at Missouri	Faurot Field; Columbia, MO	W 19–3	70,029	
November 3	at Kansas	Memorial Stadium; Lawrence, KS (rivalry)	L 28–36	48,627	
November 10	No. 2 Nebraska	KSU Stadium; Manhattan, KS (rivalry)	L 12–21	43,210	
November 17	at Oklahoma State	Lewis Field; Stillwater, OK	L 15–42	49,000	
November 24	at Colorado	Folsom Field; Boulder, CO (rivalry)	L 6–21	22,391	
*Non-conference game; ^{†}Homecoming; Rankings from AP Poll released prior to the game

== Roster ==
1979 Kansas State Wildcats football team roster
Players
Coaches
Offense

Pos.	#	Name	Class
TE	80	Mike Cox	Fr
QB	14	Bob Daniels	Jr
RB	30	Rosevelt Duncan	Sr
QB	4	Darrell Ray Dickey	Fr
QB	12	Brad Horchem	Sr
OT	77	Doug Hoppock	So
WR	18	John Liebe	Jr
RB	20	Kenny Smith	So
C	51	Pat Sura	Jr

Defense

Pos.	#	Name	Class
DE	90	Monte Bennett	Jr
DT	76	Stevan Clark	Jr
LB	93	Mitch Foote	Jr
LB	99	Mike Orr	Fr
CB	41	Steve Schuster	Jr
LB	57	Jack Williamson	So

Special teams

Pos.	#	Name	Class

Head coach

- Jim Dickey

Coordinators/assistant coaches

- Gary Darnell – Defensive Coordinator & assistant head coach
- Mo Lattimore – Offensive line
- Carl Selmer – Offensive line
- Chuck Driesbach – Defensive backs
- Dennis Franchione – Assistant
- Jim Donnan – Assistant
- Jim Davie – Assistant
- George Walstad – Assistant

Legend

- (C) Team captain
- (S) Suspended
- (I) Ineligible
- Injured
- Redshirt
