= List of Oklahoma Sooners bowl games =

- Oklahoma Sooners
- Oklahoma logo
First season	1895
Bowl record	31–26–1 (.553)
NY6 bowl appearances	39
NY6 bowl record	22–17
CFP appearances	5 (2015–16, 2017–18, 2018–19, 2019–20, 2025-26)
CFP record	0–5
First bowl appearance	1939 Orange Bowl
Last bowl appearance	2024 Armed Forces Bowl
Longest win streak	4 (1954–1959, 1972–1976, 1979–1981)
Longest losing streak	3 (2007–2009, 2018–2019, 2022–2024)
Most bowl appearances	20 (Orange Bowl)

The Oklahoma Sooners college football team competes as part of the National Collegiate Athletic Association (NCAA) Division I Football Bowl Subdivision (FBS), representing the University of Oklahoma in the Southeastern Conference. Since the establishment of the team in 1895, OU has appeared in 58 bowl games and has a record of 31 victories, 26 losses, and one tie. Oklahoma has also appeared in one College Football Playoff First Round game, losing 34–24 to Alabama in 2025. Oklahoma is one of only two schools to have appeared in all five of the BCS era bowl games (2001 Orange, 2003 Rose, 2004 Sugar, 2007 Fiesta, 2009 BCS NCG), with the other being Ohio State. Oklahoma's bowl game participation and victories rank among the top of FBS bowl records.

== List of bowl games ==
=== Key ===
General
†	Bowl game record attendance
‡	Former bowl game record attendance
^	Stadium record attendance
*	National championship game
§	Denotes College Football Playoff game

Results
W	Win
L	Loss
T	Tie

=== Bowl games ===
No.	Bowl	Score	Date	Season	Opponent	Stadium	Location	Attendance	Head coach
1	Orange Bowl	L 0–17	January 2, 1939	1938	Tennessee	Orange Bowl	Miami, Florida	32,191	Tom Stidham
2	Gator Bowl	W 34–12	January 1, 1947	1946	NC State	Fairfield Stadium	Jacksonville, Florida	10,034	Jim Tatum
3	Sugar Bowl	W 14–6	January 1, 1949	1948	North Carolina	Tulane Stadium	New Orleans, Louisiana	80,383	Bud Wilkinson
4	Sugar Bowl	W 35–0	January 2, 1950	1949	LSU	Tulane Stadium	New Orleans, Louisiana	82,000	Bud Wilkinson
5	Sugar Bowl	L 7–13	January 1, 1951	1950	Kentucky	Tulane Stadium	New Orleans, Louisiana	80,206	Bud Wilkinson
6	Orange Bowl	W 7–0	January 1, 1954	1953	Maryland	Orange Bowl	Miami, Florida	68,640	Bud Wilkinson
7	Orange Bowl	W 20–6	January 2, 1956	1955	Maryland	Orange Bowl	Miami, Florida	75,561	Bud Wilkinson
8	Orange Bowl	W 48–21	January 1, 1958	1957	Duke	Orange Bowl	Miami, Florida	76,561	Bud Wilkinson
9	Orange Bowl	W 21–6	January 1, 1959	1958	Syracuse	Orange Bowl	Miami, Florida	75,281	Bud Wilkinson
10	Orange Bowl	L 0–17	January 1, 1963	1962	Alabama	Orange Bowl	Miami, Florida	73,380	Bud Wilkinson
11	Gator Bowl	L 19–36	January 2, 1965	1964	Florida State	Gator Bowl Stadium	Miami, Florida	50,408	Gomer Jones
12	Orange Bowl	W 26–24	January 1, 1968	1967	Tennessee	Orange Bowl	Miami, Florida	77,993	Chuck Fairbanks
13	Astro-Bluebonnet Bowl	L 27–28	December 31, 1968	1968	SMU	Rice Stadium	Houston, Texas	53,453	Chuck Fairbanks
14	Astro-Bluebonnet Bowl	T 24–24	December 31, 1970	1970	Alabama	Houston Astrodome	Houston, Texas	53,822	Chuck Fairbanks
15	Sugar Bowl	W 40–22	January 1, 1972	1971	Auburn	Tulane Stadium	New Orleans, Louisiana	84,031	Chuck Fairbanks
16	Sugar Bowl	W 14–0	December 31, 1972	1972	Penn State	Tulane Stadium	New Orleans, Louisiana	72,316	Chuck Fairbanks
17	Orange Bowl	W 14–6	January 1, 1976	1975	Michigan	Orange Bowl	Miami, Florida	80,307	Barry Switzer
18	Fiesta Bowl	W 41–7	December 25, 1976	1976	Wyoming	Sun Devil Stadium	Tempe, Arizona	46,315	Barry Switzer
19	Orange Bowl	L 6–31	January 1, 1978	1977	Arkansas	Miami Orange Bowl	Miami, Florida	69,500	Barry Switzer
20	Orange Bowl	W 31–24	January 1, 1979	1978	Nebraska	Miami Orange Bowl	Miami, Florida	66,635	Barry Switzer
21	Orange Bowl	W 24–7	January 1, 1980	1979	Florida State	Miami Orange Bowl	Miami, Florida	66,714	Barry Switzer
22	Orange Bowl	W 18–17	January 1, 1981	1980	Florida State	Miami Orange Bowl	Miami, Florida	71,043	Barry Switzer
23	Sun Bowl	W 40–14	December 26, 1981	1981	Houston	Sun Bowl Stadium	El Paso, Texas	33,816	Barry Switzer
24	Fiesta Bowl	L 21–32	January 1, 1983	1982	Arizona State	Sun Devil Stadium	Tempe, Arizona	70,553	Barry Switzer
25	Orange Bowl	L 17–28	January 1, 1985	1984	Washington	Miami Orange Bowl	Miami, Florida	56,294	Barry Switzer
26	Orange Bowl	W 25–10	January 1, 1986	1985	Penn State	Miami Orange Bowl	Miami, Florida	74,178	Barry Switzer
27	Orange Bowl	W 42–8	January 1, 1987	1986	Arkansas	Miami Orange Bowl	Miami, Florida	57,291	Barry Switzer
28	Orange Bowl	L 14–20	January 1, 1988	1987	Miami	Miami Orange Bowl	Miami, Florida	74,760	Barry Switzer
29	Citrus Bowl	L 6–13	January 2, 1989	1988	Clemson	Citrus Bowl	Orlando, Florida	53,571	Barry Switzer
30	Gator Bowl	W 48–14	December 29, 1991	1991	Virginia	Gator Bowl Stadium	Jacksonville, Florida	62,003	Gary Gibbs
31	John Hancock Bowl	W 41–10	December 24, 1993	1993	Texas Tech	Sun Bowl Stadium	El Paso, Texas	43,848	Gary Gibbs
32	Copper Bowl	L 6–31	December 29, 1994	1994	BYU	Arizona Stadium	Tucson, Arizona	45,122	Gary Gibbs
33	Independence Bowl	L 25–27	December 31, 1999	1999	Ole Miss	Independence Stadium	Shreveport, Louisiana	49,843	Bob Stoops
34	Orange Bowl*	W 13–2	January 3, 2001	2000	Florida State	Pro Player Stadium	Miami Gardens, Florida	76,835	Bob Stoops
35	Cotton Bowl	W 10–3	January 1, 2002	2001	Arkansas	Cotton Bowl	Dallas, Texas	72,955	Bob Stoops
36	Rose Bowl	W 34–14	January 1, 2003	2002	Washington State	Rose Bowl	Pasadena, California	86,848	Bob Stoops
37	Sugar Bowl*	L 14–21	January 4, 2004	2003	LSU	Louisiana Superdome	New Orleans, Louisiana	79,342	Bob Stoops
38	Orange Bowl*	L 19–55	January 4, 2005	2004	USC	Pro Player Stadium	Miami Gardens, Florida	77,912	Bob Stoops
39	Holiday Bowl	W 17–14	December 29, 2005	2005	Oregon	Qualcomm Stadium	San Diego, California	65,416	Bob Stoops
40	Fiesta Bowl	L 42–43	January 1, 2007	2006	Boise State	University of Phoenix Stadium	Glendale, Arizona	73,719	Bob Stoops
41	Fiesta Bowl	L 28–48	January 2, 2008	2007	West Virginia	University of Phoenix Stadium	Glendale, Arizona	70,016	Bob Stoops
42	BCS National Championship*	L 14–24	January 8, 2009	2008	Florida	Dolphin Stadium	Miami Gardens, Florida	70,016	Bob Stoops
43	Sun Bowl	W 31–27	December 31, 2009	2009	Stanford	Sun Bowl Stadium	El Paso, Texas	53,713	Bob Stoops
44	Fiesta Bowl	W 48–20	January 1, 2011	2010	Connecticut	University of Phoenix Stadium	Glendale, Arizona	67,232	Bob Stoops
45	Insight Bowl	W 31–14	December 30, 2011	2011	Iowa	Sun Devil Stadium	Tempe, Arizona	54,247	Bob Stoops
46	Cotton Bowl	L 13–41	January 4, 2013	2012	Texas A&M	Cowboys Stadium	Arlington, Texas	87,025	Bob Stoops
47	Sugar Bowl	W 45–31	January 2, 2014	2013	Alabama	Mercedes-Benz Superdome	New Orleans, Louisiana	70,473	Bob Stoops
48	Russell Athletic Bowl	L 6–40	December 29, 2014	2014	Clemson	Orlando Citrus Bowl Stadium	Orlando, Florida	42,702	Bob Stoops
49	Orange Bowl§	L 17–37	December 31, 2015	2015	Clemson	Sun Life Stadium	Miami Gardens, Florida	67,615	Bob Stoops
50	Sugar Bowl	W 35–19	January 2, 2017	2016	Auburn	Mercedes-Benz Superdome	New Orleans, Louisiana	54,077	Bob Stoops
51	Rose Bowl§	L 48–54 (2OT)	January 1, 2018	2017	Georgia	Rose Bowl	Pasadena, California	92,844	Lincoln Riley
52	Orange Bowl§	L 34–45	December 29, 2018	2018	Alabama	Hard Rock Stadium	Miami Gardens, Florida	66,203	Lincoln Riley
53	Peach Bowl§	L 28–63	December 28, 2019	2019	LSU	Mercedes-Benz Stadium	Atlanta, Georgia	78,347	Lincoln Riley
54	Cotton Bowl	W 55–20	December 30, 2020	2020	Florida	AT&T Stadium	Arlington, Texas	17,323	Lincoln Riley
55	Alamo Bowl	W 47–32	December 29, 2021	2021	Oregon	Alamodome	San Antonio, Texas	59,121	Bob Stoops
56	Cheez-It Bowl	L 32–35	December 29, 2022	2022	Florida State	Camping World Stadium	Orlando, Florida	61,520	Brent Venables
57	Alamo Bowl	L 24–38	December 28, 2023	2023	Arizona	Alamodome	San Antonio, Texas	55,853	Brent Venables
58	Armed Forces Bowl	L 20–21	December 27, 2024	2024	Navy	Amon G. Carter Stadium	Fort Worth, Texas	50,754	Brent Venables
