= 1980 Orange Bowl =

American college football game

- 46th Orange Bowl
- The Miami Orange Bowl in Miami, Florida, hosted the Orange Bowl.
Florida State Seminoles	Oklahoma Sooners
(11–0)	(10–1)
Independent	Big Eight
7	24
Head coach: Bobby Bowden	Head coach: Barry Switzer
AP / Coaches; 4 / 4	AP / Coaches; 5 / 5
	1	2	3	4	Total
Florida State	7	0	0	0	7
Oklahoma	0	17	0	7	24
- Date: January 1, 1980
- Season: 1979
- Stadium: Orange Bowl
- Location: Miami, Florida
- MVP: J. C. Watts (Oklahoma QB); Bud Hebert (Oklahoma FS)
- Favorite: Oklahoma by 7½ points
- Referee: Vincent Buckley (SWC)
- Attendance: 66,714

United States TV coverage
- Network: NBC
- Announcers: Don Criqui, John Brodie, and Bob Trumpy
- Nielsen ratings: 25.1

The 1980 Orange Bowl was the 46th edition of the college football bowl game, played at the Orange Bowl in Miami, Florida, on Tuesday, January 1. Part of the 1979–80 bowl game season, it matched the fourth-ranked independent Florida State Seminoles and the #5 Oklahoma Sooners of the Big Eight Conference. Favored Oklahoma overcame an early deficit and won 24–7.

== Teams ==
=== Florida State ===
This was Florida State's first major bowl appearance as they attempted to complete a perfect undefeated season; they were on a fifteen-game win streak, which began in October 1978. Their most recent bowl was two years earlier.

=== Oklahoma ===
The Sooners' only loss was to Texas in mid-October; they were champions of the Big Eight Conference for the seventh straight year. Oklahoma was appearing in their eleventh Orange Bowl, the third of four consecutive.

== Game summary ==
Mike Whiting gave the Seminoles a lead with his touchdown run, but that was their only score of the night. A fumbled field goal snap, three turnovers, over 100 yards of rushing by quarterback J. C. Watts and halfback Billy Sims, and 24 unanswered points by Oklahoma doomed the Seminoles. It all started with a Watts run for a touchdown in the second quarter to tie the game at seven. After the kickoff, the Seminoles turned the ball over on an interception, giving the ball back to Oklahoma. Stanley Wilson then scored a touchdown run to make it 14–7. Mike Keeling added a field goal late in the quarter to give the Sooners a 17–7 lead at halftime.

The second half scoring was limited to one Oklahoma touchdown from 22 yards out in the fourth quarter; Watts ran for twelve yards before pitching the ball to Sims, who took it the rest of the way for a 24–7 lead, the final score. The Sooners ran for 411 yards on 59 carries, an average of nearly seven yards per attempt, while having twice as many total yards as the Seminoles.

Free safety Bud Hebert (No. 33) had 3 interceptions in the game - a record that stands to this day.

=== Scoring ===
First quarter

- Florida State – Mike Whiting 1-yard run (Dave Cappelen kick)

Second quarter

- Oklahoma – J. C. Watts 61-yard run (Mike Keeling kick)
- Oklahoma – Stanley Wilson 5-yard run (Keeling kick)
- Oklahoma – Keeling 24-yard field goal

Third quarter
No scoring
Fourth quarter

- Oklahoma – Billy Sims 22-yard run, lateral from Watts (Keeling kick)

== Statistics ==
Statistics	Florida State	Oklahoma
First downs	12	23
Rushes–yards	35–82	59–411
Passing yards	100	36
Passes (C–A–I)	8–27–3	2–4–0
Total Offense	62–182	63–447
Punts–average	9–42.2	4–25.0
Fumbles–lost	1–0	5–4
Turnovers	3	4
Penalties–yards	4–20	3–27

== Aftermath ==
Oklahoma climbed to third in the final AP poll and Florida State fell to sixth.

Both teams returned the following year, and Oklahoma won by a point.
