= 1981 Orange Bowl =

- 47th Orange Bowl
- The Miami Orange Bowl in Miami, Florida, hosted the Orange Bowl.
Oklahoma Sooners	Florida State Seminoles
(9–2)	(10–1)
Big Eight	Independent
18	17
Head coach: Barry Switzer	Head coach: Bobby Bowden
AP / Coaches; 4 / 4	AP / Coaches; 2 / 2
	1	2	3	4	Total
Oklahoma	0	3	7	8	18
Florida State	0	7	3	7	17
- Date: January 1, 1981
- Season: 1980
- Stadium: Orange Bowl
- Location: Miami, Florida
- MVP: J. C. Watts (Oklahoma QB); Jarvis Coursey (FSU DE)
- Favorite: Oklahoma by 5½ points
- Referee: Gene Calhoun (Big Ten)
- Attendance: 71,043

United States TV coverage
- Network: NBC
- Announcers: Don Criqui and John Brodie
- Nielsen ratings: 24.1

The 1981 Orange Bowl was the 47th edition of the college football bowl game, played at the Orange Bowl in Miami, Florida, on Thursday, January 1. Part of the 1980–81 bowl game season, it matched the fourth-ranked Oklahoma Sooners of the Big Eight Conference and the independent #2 Florida State Seminoles.

Favored Oklahoma rallied to win by a point, 18–17.

== Teams ==
The game was a rematch of the previous year, and both teams were on seven-game winning streaks.

=== Oklahoma ===
The Sooners lost two non-conference games, to Stanford at home, and rival Texas in Dallas. They were champions of the Big Eight Conference for the eighth consecutive year. This was Oklahoma's twelfth Orange Bowl appearance, fourth consecutive, and fifth in six seasons.

=== Florida State ===
The Seminoles' only blemish was a one-point loss at rival Miami in late September. This was Florida State's second major bowl appearance, after playing in last year's edition.

== Game summary ==
After a scoreless first quarter, Ricky Williams put Florida State ahead with his touchdown run, and Oklahoma countered with a long field goal by Mike Keeling; the Seminoles led 7–3 at halftime.

To start the second half, Oklahoma drove 78 yards on twelve plays, and halfback David Overstreet scored from four yards out to take a 10–7 lead. A short field goal by Bill Capece tied the game at ten for the last tally of the third quarter.

Four minutes into the final quarter, cornerback Bobby Butler recovered a botched punt snap in the end zone to give the Seminoles a 17–10 lead. With 3:19 remaining, Oklahoma's fate laid in the hands of senior quarterback J. C. Watts, who had turned the ball over three times on fumbles. He led the Sooners on a 78-yard drive, culminating with an eleven-yard touchdown pass to wide receiver Steve Rhodes with 1:33 remaining. Down by a point, Oklahoma opted for the two-point conversion attempt, and Watts completed a pass to tight end Forrest Valora in the end zone for a one-point lead. Florida State tried to counter back, but Capece's 62-yard field goal attempt fell short, and the Sooners were victorious.

=== Scoring ===
First quarter
No scoring
Second quarter

- Florida State – Ricky Williams 10-yard run (Bill Capece kick)
- Oklahoma – Mike Keeling 53-yard field goal

Third quarter

- Oklahoma – David Overstreet 4-yard run (Keeling kick)
- Florida State – Capece 19-yard field goal

Fourth quarter

- Florida State – Bobby Butler fumble recovery of punt snap (Capece kick)
- Oklahoma – Steve Rhodes 11-yard pass from J. C. Watts (Forrest Valora pass from Watts)

== Statistics ==
Statistics	Oklahoma	Florida State
First downs	18	23
Rushes–yards	55–156	60–212
Passing yards	128	51
Passes (C–A–I)	7–12–0	11–15–0
Total Offense	67–284	75–263
Return yards	18	−6
Punts–average	2–37.0	4–42.5
Fumbles–lost	7–5	1–0
Turnovers	5	0
Penalties–yards	4–32	5–58

== Aftermath ==
Oklahoma climbed to third in the final AP poll and Florida State fell to fifth.

The Sooners' next Orange Bowl was four years later, the first of four consecutive; the Seminoles did not return for twelve years.
