= 1979 Oklahoma State Cowboys football team =

American college football season

1979 Oklahoma State Cowboys football
- Conference: Big Eight Conference
- Record: 7–4 (5–2 Big 8)
- Head coach: Jimmy Johnson (1st season)
- Home stadium: Lewis Field

1979 Big Eight Conference football standings
	Conf.					Overall
Team	W		L		T	W		L		T
No. 3 Oklahoma $	7	–	0	–	0	11	–	1	–	0
No. 9 Nebraska	6	–	1	–	0	10	–	2	–	0
Oklahoma State	5	–	2	–	0	7	–	4	–	0
Missouri	3	–	4	–	0	7	–	5	–	0
Colorado	2	–	5	–	0	3	–	8	–	0
Iowa State	2	–	5	–	0	3	–	8	–	0
Kansas	2	–	5	–	0	3	–	8	–	0
Kansas State	1	–	6	–	0	3	–	8	–	0
$ – Conference champion; Rankings from AP Poll

The 1979 Oklahoma State Cowboys football team represented Oklahoma State University in the Big Eight Conference during the 1979 NCAA Division I-A football season. In their first season under head coach Jimmy Johnson, the Cowboys compiled a 7–4 record (5–2 against conference opponents), finished in third place in the conference, and were outscored by opponents by a combined total of 212 to 191.

The team's statistical leaders included Worley Taylor with 994 rushing yards, Harold Bailey with 1,301 passing yards, Ron Ingram with 323 receiving yards, and placekicker Colin Ankersen with 55 points scored.

The team played its home games at Lewis Field in Stillwater, Oklahoma.

== Schedule ==
Date	Opponent	Site	Result	Attendance	Source
September 8	North Texas State*	Lewis Field; Stillwater, OK	W 25–7	41,800	
September 15	Wichita State*	Lewis Field; Stillwater, OK	W 16–6	42,000	
September 22	at No. 15 Arkansas*	War Memorial Stadium; Little Rock, AR	L 7–27	55,812	
October 6	at South Carolina*	Williams–Brice Stadium; Columbia, SC	L 16–23	56,405	
October 13	at No. 15 Missouri	Faurot Field; Columbia, MO	W 14–13	66,003	
October 20	No. 3 Nebraska	Lewis Field; Stillwater, OK	L 0–36	51,000	
October 27	at Kansas	Memorial Stadium; Lawrence, KS	W 30–17	29,671	
November 3	No. 7 Oklahoma	Lewis Field; Stillwater, OK (Bedlam Series)	L 7–38	51,453	
November 10	at Colorado	Folsom Field; Boulder, CO	W 21–20	41,148	
November 17	Kansas State^{†}	Lewis Field; Stillwater, OK	W 42–15	49,000	
November 24	at Iowa State	Cyclone Stadium; Ames, IA	W 13–10	36,000	
*Non-conference game; ^{†}Homecoming; Rankings from AP Poll released prior to the game

== Roster ==
- QB John Doerner
- FB Terry Suellentrop (offense)
- TE Donnie Echols, Sr.

== 1980 NFL draft ==
The following Cowboys were selected in the 1980 NFL draft:

Player	Position	Round	Overall pick	NFL team
John Corker	LB	5	134	Houston Oilers
Harold Bailey	QB	8	217	Houston Oilers
