= 1979 Kansas Jayhawks football team =

American college football season

1979 Kansas Jayhawks football
- Conference: Big Eight Conference
- Record: 3–8 (2–5 Big 8)
- Head coach: Don Fambrough (5th season)
- Captains: Brian Bethke; Mike Gay; Monty Carbonell
- Home stadium: Memorial Stadium

1979 Big Eight Conference football standings
	Conf.					Overall
Team	W		L		T	W		L		T
No. 3 Oklahoma $	7	–	0	–	0	11	–	1	–	0
No. 9 Nebraska	6	–	1	–	0	10	–	2	–	0
Oklahoma State	5	–	2	–	0	7	–	4	–	0
Missouri	3	–	4	–	0	7	–	5	–	0
Colorado	2	–	5	–	0	3	–	8	–	0
Iowa State	2	–	5	–	0	3	–	8	–	0
Kansas	2	–	5	–	0	3	–	8	–	0
Kansas State	1	–	6	–	0	3	–	8	–	0
$ – Conference champion; Rankings from AP Poll

The 1979 Kansas Jayhawks football team represented the University of Kansas in the Big Eight Conference during the 1979 NCAA Division I-A football season. After a four year absence, Don Fambrough returned as the team's head coach, and the Jayhawks compiled a 3–8 record (2–5 against conference opponents), tied for fifth place in the conference, and were outscored by opponents by a combined total of 346 to 172. They played their home games at Memorial Stadium in Lawrence, Kansas.

The team's statistical leaders included Brian Bethke with 874 passing yards, Harry Sydney with 541 rushing yards, and David Verser with 463 receiving yards. Brian Bethke, Mike Gay, and Monty Carbonell were the team captains.

== Schedule ==
Date	Opponent	Site	Result	Attendance	Source
September 15	at No. 16 Pittsburgh*	Pitt Stadium; Pittsburgh, PA	L 0–24	41,545	
September 22	at No. 11 Michigan*	Michigan Stadium; Ann Arbor, MI	L 7–28	103,698	
September 29	North Texas State*	Memorial Stadium; Lawrence, KS	W 37–18	39,460	
October 6	Syracuse*	Memorial Stadium; Lawrence, KS	L 27–45	36,720	
October 13	at No. 5 Nebraska	Memorial Stadium; Lincoln, NE (rivalry)	L 0–42	76,011	
October 20	at Iowa State	Cyclone Stadium; Ames, IA	W 24–7	47,064–48,100	
October 27	Oklahoma State^{†}	Memorial Stadium; Lawrence, KS	L 17–30	29,671	
November 3	Kansas State	Memorial Stadium; Lawrence, KS (Sunflower Showdown)	W 36–28	48,627	
November 10	at No. 6 Oklahoma	Oklahoma Memorial Stadium; Norman, OK	L 0–38	71,822	
November 17	Colorado	Memorial Stadium; Lawrence, KS	L 17–31	25,572–31,125	
November 24	Missouri	Memorial Stadium; Lawrence, KS (Border War)	L 7–55	34,599	
*Non-conference game; ^{†}Homecoming; Rankings from AP Poll released prior to the game

== Roster ==
1979 Kansas Jayhawks football team roster
Players
Coaches
Offense

Pos.	#	Name	Class
QB	17	Brian Bethke	Sr
WR	20	Wayne Capers	Fr
RB	44	Larry Kemp	Jr
WR	3	Lester Mickens	Jr
RB	24	Harry Sydney	Jr
WR	89	David Verser	Jr

Defense

Pos.	#	Name	Class
LB	88	Kirby Criswell	Sr
DT	95	Jeff Fox	Jr
CB	47	LeRoy Irvin	Sr
LB	81	Kyle McNorton	So
DT	77	Greg Smith	So
CB	41	Joe Tumpich	Jr
DB	5	Dan Wagoner	So
LB	52	Scellars Young	Jr
LB	51	Jim Zidd	Sr

Special teams

Pos.	#	Name	Class
P	18	Mike Hubach	Sr

Head coach

- Don Fambrough

Coordinators/assistant coaches

Legend

- (C) Team captain
- (S) Suspended
- (I) Ineligible
- Injured
- Redshirt
