= 1979 Iowa State Cyclones football team =

American college football season

1979 Iowa State Cyclones football
- Conference: Big Eight Conference
- Record: 3–8 (2–5 Big 8)
- Head coach: Donnie Duncan (1st season)
- Offensive coordinator: Dal Shealy (1st season)
- Home stadium: Cylcone Stadium

1979 Big Eight Conference football standings
	Conf.					Overall
Team	W		L		T	W		L		T
No. 3 Oklahoma $	7	–	0	–	0	11	–	1	–	0
No. 9 Nebraska	6	–	1	–	0	10	–	2	–	0
Oklahoma State	5	–	2	–	0	7	–	4	–	0
Missouri	3	–	4	–	0	7	–	5	–	0
Colorado	2	–	5	–	0	3	–	8	–	0
Iowa State	2	–	5	–	0	3	–	8	–	0
Kansas	2	–	5	–	0	3	–	8	–	0
Kansas State	1	–	6	–	0	3	–	8	–	0
$ – Conference champion; Rankings from AP Poll

The 1979 Iowa State Cyclones football team represented Iowa State University as a member of the Big Eight Conference during the 1979 NCAA Division I-A football season. Led by first-year head coach Donnie Duncan, the Cyclones compiled an overall record of 3–8 with a mark of 2–5 in conference play, placing in a three-way tie for fifth in the Big 8. Iowa State played home games at Cylcone Stadium in Ames, Iowa.

== Schedule ==
Date	Time	Opponent	Site	TV	Result	Attendance	Source
September 15	1:30 pm	Bowling Green*	Cylcone Stadium; Ames, IA		W 38–10	47,300	
September 22	7:00 pm	at No. 4 Texas*	Texas Memorial Stadium; Austin, TX		L 9–17	73,652	
September 29	1:05 pm	at Iowa*	Kinnick Stadium; Iowa City, IA (rivalry)	KWWL (delay)	L 14–30	60,100	
October 6	1:30 pm	Pacific (CA)*	Cyclone Stadium; Ames, IA		L 7–24	47,600	
October 13	1:30 pm	at Kansas State	KSU Stadium; Manhattan, KS (rivalry)		W 7–3	23,400	
October 20	1:30 pm	Kansas^{†}	Cyclone Stadium; Ames, IA		L 7–24	47,064–48,100	
October 27	1:30 pm	at No. 7 Oklahoma	Oklahoma Memorial Stadium; Norman, OK		L 9–38	71,187	
November 3	1:30 pm	Colorado	Cyclone Stadium; Ames, IA		W 24–10	47,100	
November 10	11:50 am	Missouri	Cyclone Stadium; Ames, IA (rivalry)	ABC	L 9–18	46,800	
November 17	1:30 pm	at No. 3 Nebraska	Memorial Stadium; Lincoln, NE (rivalry)		L 3–34	76,049	
November 24	1:30 pm	Oklahoma State	Cyclone Stadium; Ames, IA		L 10–13	36,000	
*Non-conference game; ^{†}Homecoming; Rankings from AP Poll released prior to the game; All times are in Central time

== Roster ==
1979 Iowa State Cyclones football team roster
Players
Coaches
Offense

Pos.	#	Name	Class
WR	26	Tom Buck	Sr
RB	45	Dwayne Crutchfield	So
FB	40	Dan Goodwin	Fr
QB	15	Dave Jacobson	So
TE	88	Dan Johnson	So
C	56	Jim Meyer	Fr
OT	69	Karl Nelson	Fr
QB	16	Ronnie Osborne	Fr
QB	18	John Quinn	So
TE	86	Lee West	So

Defense

Pos.	#	Name	Class
CB	20	John Arnaud	Fr
CB	19	Joe Brown	So
LB	50	Scott Cole	Sr
CB	44	Larry Crawford	Jr
LB	55	Jim Less	Jr
DT	62	Kenny Neil	Jr
DT	74	Scott Nelson	Fr
LB		Jay Niemann	Fr
FS	26	Mike Schwartz	Sr

Special teams

Pos.	#	Name	Class
P	3	Rich Miller	So

Head coach

- Donnie Duncan

Coordinators/assistant coaches

- Mack Brown (Wide receivers)

Legend

- (C) Team captain
- (S) Suspended
- (I) Ineligible
- Injured
- Redshirt
