= Johnny Lee Clary =

American preacher and professional wrestler

2nd Grand Wizard of the White Knights of the Ku Klux Klan
- In office 1989–1990
- Preceded by: Samuel Bowers
- Succeeded by: Position abolished

Personal details
- Born: June 18, 1959 Martinez, California, U.S.
- Died: October 21, 2014 (aged 55) Baton Rouge, Louisiana, U.S.
- Occupation: Preacher, professional wrestler, former KKK leader

Johnny Lee Clary (June 18, 1959 – October 21, 2014) was an American professional wrestler, reformed white supremacist, and later preacher. Clary served as a Ku Klux Klan leader before he became a Pentecostal Christian, traveling around the world preaching the gospel and teaching against racism and hate groups such as the Ku Klux Klan, neo-Nazis, and Aryan Nations. Clary, under the stage name Johnny Angel, also wrestled in the National Wrestling Federation (NWF) during the 1980s.

== Early life ==
Johnny Lee Clary was born on June 18, 1959, in Martinez, California. He was reportedly raised in a racist home, where his father encouraged racist language and abusive treatment of black people and saw to it that Clary attended an all-white church. Although Clary's father, a Catholic, was not a Klansman, Clary claimed that his paternal uncle, Harold, was a member and that Harold boasted to Clary's father of shooting an African-American man. Johnny's father sent his son on the Sunday school bus every week to the First Baptist Church.

According to interviews Clary had given, his youth was marred by a violent and tragic family life and also by a lack of stability. At the age of 11, he watched his father kill himself and was subsequently shunted from one family member's home to another's. Eventually he found himself alone in East Los Angeles, California, where he became involved in gangs and joined the Ku Klux Klan by the time he was 14.

== Professional wrestling career ==
In 1983, Johnny became a professional wrestler and was trained (along with his brother Terry Clary) by former NWA World Junior Heavyweight Champion, Danny Hodge. Terry began his career under the name Sugar Boy, with Johnny as his manager under the name Der Kommisar after a 1980s new wave song of that name. Terry is best known for almost holding the NWA World Jr. Heavyweight Title for a very brief period. The storyline had Terry defeat then-champion Danny Hodge after Johnny (portraying a heel managerial character) reached under the ropes during the match and tripped Hodge with a cane, and then had the decision reversed due to Johnny's "interference". Terry continued to wrestle, changing his name to Buddy "Bad Man" Savage. Johnny left wrestling management and began wrestling by himself, using the name Johnny Angel.

== Racism and conversion to an anti-racism preacher ==
While he was wrestling, Clary continued his involvement in the KKK. According to his interviews with several media outlets, Clary became the Grand Dragon of the Oklahoma arm of the White Knights Of The Ku Klux Klan. Clary claims to have become increasingly disillusioned with the KKK even as he rose through its ranks. He mentions a first brush with evangelical Christianity in the mid-to-late 1980s but, he claims, he was scared into returning to the KKK and went on to become the Imperial Wizard of the whole White Knights organization in 1989. During his leadership the White Knights did not garner much media attention for their activities, but Clary was an active spokesperson for the Klan, defending racism and violence against non-white peoples. In this role he appeared on syndicated talk shows including those hosted by Oprah Winfrey and Morton Downey.

In interviews Clary asserts that he left the KKK for good in 1990 and joined an evangelical church. This time he stayed with the church and in 1991 he began preaching. He teamed up with Wade Watts, a preacher and former leader of the Oklahoma chapter of the National Association for the Advancement of Colored People (NAACP) with whom he had previously sparred on numerous occasions during his time in the KKK.

The story of Clary's conversion from a Klansman to an anti-racism preacher has drawn the attention of numerous Christian media outlets and several national Australian talk shows. He appeared on talk shows such as Donahue, and Geraldo, discussing racial issues in the U.S.

Clary was an ordained minister under World Evangelism Fellowship and Church Of God In Christ and lived in Baton Rouge, Louisiana. In 2009, he joined Jimmy Swaggart Ministries' Family Worship Center, where his wife is employed and began to preach and teach part-time there. He had been an active member there appearing on their Christian Network Sonlife Broadcasting Network on occasion.

== Death ==
At his home in Baton Rouge, Louisiana, Clary suddenly died of a massive heart attack on October 21, 2014.

== See also ==
- Leaders of the Ku Klux Klan
- The Day I Met God (book)
