= 1979 South Carolina Gamecocks football team =

American college football season

1979 South Carolina Gamecocks football

Hall of Fame Classic, L 14–24 vs. Missouri
- Conference: Independent
- Record: 8–4
- Head coach: Jim Carlen (5th season)
- Defensive coordinator: Richard Bell (5th season)
- Home stadium: Williams–Brice Stadium

1979 NCAA Division I-A independents football records
	Conf.					Overall
Team	W		L		T	W		L		T
No. 6 Florida State		–		–		11	–	1	–	0
No. 7 Pittsburgh		–		–		11	–	1	–	0
UNLV		–		–		9	–	1	–	2
No. 17 Temple		–		–		10	–	2	–	0
Tulane		–		–		9	–	3	–	0
Rutgers		–		–		8	–	3	–	0
Tennessee State		–		–		8	–	3	–	0
East Carolina		–		–		7	–	3	–	1
No. 20 Penn State		–		–		8	–	4	–	0
South Carolina		–		–		8	–	4	–	0
Navy		–		–		7	–	4	–	0
Notre Dame		–		–		7	–	4	–	0
Southern Miss		–		–		6	–	4	–	1
Syracuse		–		–		7	–	5	–	0
Colgate		–		–		5	–	4	–	1
Boston College		–		–		5	–	6	–	0
Holy Cross		–		–		5	–	6	–	0
Memphis State		–		–		5	–	6	–	0
Miami (FL)		–		–		5	–	6	–	0
North Texas State		–		–		5	–	6	–	0
Villanova		–		–		5	–	6	–	0
Virginia Tech		–		–		5	–	6	–	0
West Virginia		–		–		5	–	6	–	0
Georgia Tech		–		–		4	–	6	–	1
Louisville		–		–		4	–	6	–	1
William & Mary		–		–		4	–	7	–	0
Illinois State		–		–		3	–	8	–	0
Northeast Louisiana		–		–		3	–	8	–	0
Army		–		–		2	–	8	–	1
Air Force		–		–		2	–	9	–	0
Cincinnati		–		–		2	–	9	–	0
Richmond		–		–		0	–	11	–	0
Rankings from AP Poll

The 1979 South Carolina Gamecocks football team represented the University of South Carolina as an independent during the 1979 NCAA Division I-A football season. Led by fifth-year head coach Jim Carlen, the Gamecocks compiled a record of 8–4. South Carolina was invited to the Hall of Fame Classic, where they lost to Missouri, 24–14.

In 1979, despite pressure on Carlen's job security, South Carolina received some preseason hype, as they returned eighteen of the 22 starters from last season. The Gamecocks would live up to the hype, with wins over two top-20 teams, their highest ranking since 1976, and their first bowl appearance since 1975. South Carolina's eight wins were the most since 1903. If only considering wins against college football teams, the eight wins were the most in program history. It would be the first of five eight-win seasons for the program in the late 1970s and 1980s.

== Schedule ==
Date	Opponent	Rank	Site	TV	Result	Attendance	Source
September 8	at North Carolina		Kenan Memorial Stadium; Chapel Hill, NC (rivalry)	ESPN	L 0–28	49,500	
September 15	Western Michigan		Williams–Brice Stadium; Columbia, SC		W 24–7	50,137	
September 22	Duke		Williams–Brice Stadium; Columbia, SC		W 35–0	53,793	
September 26	at Georgia		Sanford Stadium; Athens, GA (rivalry)		W 27–20	60,100	
October 6	Oklahoma State		Williams–Brice Stadium; Columbia, SC		W 23–16	56,405	
October 20	Ole Miss		Williams–Brice Stadium; Columbia, SC		W 21–14	56,407	
October 27	at No. 14 Notre Dame		Notre Dame Stadium; Notre Dame, IN		L 17–18	59,075	
November 3	NC State		Williams–Brice Stadium; Columbia, SC		W 30–28	56,409	
November 10	at No. 7 Florida State	No. 19	Doak Campbell Stadium; Tallahassee, FL		L 7–27	49,490	
November 17	No. 17 Wake Forest		Williams–Brice Stadium; Columbia, SC		W 35–14	56,407	
November 24	No. 13 Clemson	No. 19	Williams–Brice Stadium; Columbia, SC (rivalry)	ESPN	W 13–9	56,887	
December 29	vs. Missouri	No. 16	Legion Field; Birmingham, AL (Hall of Fame Classic)	Mizlou	L 14–24	62,785	
Rankings from AP Poll released prior to the game

== Roster ==
1979 South Carolina Gamecocks football team roster
Players
Coaches
Offense

Pos.	#	Name	Class
G	63	Fred David	Sr
C	61	Quay Farr	Sr
QB	10	Garry Harper	Jr
WR	41	Zion McKinney	Sr
TE	47	Willie Scott	Jr
RB	38	George Rogers	Jr

Defense

Pos.	#	Name	Class
DT	74	Chuck Allen	Jr
DT	70	Steve Bernish	Sr
DB	23	Lou Biondi	Sr
DE	81	Brett Bond	Sr
DE	82	Arthur Broussard	Sr
DB	21	Andy Hastings	Sr
DB	22	Tim Rhino	Fr
LB	54	Tim Singleton	Sr
LB	23	Scott Wade	Sr

Special teams

Pos.	#	Name	Class
P		Ray Feltz

Head coach

- Jim Carlen

Coordinators/assistant coaches

Legend

- (C) Team captain
- (S) Suspended
- (I) Ineligible
- Injured
- Redshirt
