= 1979 Nebraska Cornhuskers football team =

American college football season

1979 Nebraska Cornhuskers football

Cotton Bowl Classic, L 14–17 vs. Houston
- Conference: Big Eight Conference

Ranking
- Coaches: No. 7
- AP: No. 9
- Record: 10–2 (6–1 Big 8)
- Head coach: Tom Osborne (7th season)
- Offensive scheme: I formation
- Defensive coordinator: Lance Van Zandt (3rd season)
- Base defense: 5–2
- Home stadium: Memorial Stadium

1979 Big Eight Conference football standings
	Conf.					Overall
Team	W		L		T	W		L		T
No. 3 Oklahoma $	7	–	0	–	0	11	–	1	–	0
No. 9 Nebraska	6	–	1	–	0	10	–	2	–	0
Oklahoma State	5	–	2	–	0	7	–	4	–	0
Missouri	3	–	4	–	0	7	–	5	–	0
Colorado	2	–	5	–	0	3	–	8	–	0
Iowa State	2	–	5	–	0	3	–	8	–	0
Kansas	2	–	5	–	0	3	–	8	–	0
Kansas State	1	–	6	–	0	3	–	8	–	0
$ – Conference champion; Rankings from AP Poll

The 1979 Nebraska Cornhuskers football team represented the University of Nebraska–Lincoln in the 1979 NCAA Division I-A football season. The team was coached by Tom Osborne and played their home games in Memorial Stadium in Lincoln, Nebraska.

== Schedule ==
Date	Time	Opponent	Rank	Site	TV	Result	Attendance	Source
September 15	1:30 pm	Utah State*	No. 8	Memorial Stadium; Lincoln, NE		W 35–14	75,953	
September 22	1:05 pm	at Iowa*	No. 7	Kinnick Stadium; Iowa City, IA (rivalry)		W 24–21	60,005	
September 29	11:45 am	No. 18 Penn State*	No. 6	Memorial Stadium; Lincoln, NE	ABC	W 42–17	76,151	
October 6	1:30 pm	New Mexico State*	No. 5	Memorial Stadium; Lincoln, NE		W 57–0	76,135	
October 13	1:30 pm	Kansas^{†}	No. 5	Memorial Stadium; Lincoln, NE (rivalry)		W 42–0	76,011	
October 20	1:30 pm	at Oklahoma State	No. 3	Lewis Field; Stillwater, OK		W 36–0	51,000	
October 27	1:30 pm	Colorado	No. 2	Memorial Stadium; Lincoln, NE (rivalry)		W 38–10	76,158	
November 3	1:30 pm	at Missouri	No. 2	Faurot Field; Columbia, MO (rivalry)		W 23–20	74,575	
November 10	1:30 pm	at Kansas State	No. 2	KSU Stadium; Manhattan, KS (rivalry)		W 21–12	43,210	
November 17	1:30 pm	Iowa State	No. 3	Memorial Stadium; Lincoln, NE (rivalry)		W 34–3	76,049	
November 24	11:30 am	at No. 8 Oklahoma	No. 3	Oklahoma Memorial Stadium; Norman, OK (rivalry)	ABC	L 14–17	72,516	
January 1, 1980	1:10 pm	vs. No. 8 Houston*	No. 7	Cotton Bowl; Dallas, TX (Cotton Bowl Classic)	CBS	L 14–17	72,032	
*Non-conference game; ^{†}Homecoming; Rankings from AP Poll released prior to the game; All times are in Central time

== Roster ==
Adams, Joe #64 (Jr.) OG; Baker, Kim #41 (Jr.) LB; Barnett, Bill #97 (Sr.) DT; Bates, Phil (So.) FB; Beach, Jim (So.) DB; Bergkamp, Tim #36 (Jr.) PK; Bess, Donnie (So.) DE; Bloom, Jeff #50 (Sr.) C Boll, Peter (So.) OT; Branch, Anthony #4 (So.) WB; Brandl, Matt (So.) OG; Brown, Kenny #22 (Sr.) WB; Brown, Todd #29 (Fr.) SE; Bruce, Mike #76 (Jr.) OT; Bush, Anthony (So.) SE; Carlstrom, Tom #78 (So.) OG; Clark, David #63 (Jr.) DT; Cole, Lawrence #81 (Sr.) DE; Conneally, Jerry (So.) LB; Damkroger, Steve #35 (Fr.) LB; Davies, Steve #82 (Jr.) TE; DeLoach, Trey #52 (Jr.) C England, Gary #70 (Jr.) OT; Evans, Brent (So.) FB; Finn, Jeff #87 (Jr.) TE; Fischer, Dan #26 (So.) DB; Franklin, Andra #39 (Jr.) FB; Gary, Russell #9 (Jr.) DB; Gdowski, Tom (So.) DT; Gebert, Chris #14 (So.) QB; Gemar, Scott #1 (Jr.) PK; Gerlach, Dan (So.) DB; Glathar, Kurt (So.) OG; Goodspeed, Mark #72 (Sr.) OT; Hager, Tim #10 (Sr.) QB; Havekost, John #69 (Sr.) OG; Hedrick, Brian #43 (Jr.) DT; Hill, Dan (So.) TE; Hineline, Curt #59 (So.) MG; Hipp, I.M. #32 (Sr.) IB; Holbrook, Tim (So.) DB; Holmes, Daryl #94 (Jr.) DE	Horn, Rod #55 (Sr.) DT; Huebert, Randy (So.) WB; Hunt, Al #49 (So.) FB; Hurley, Dan #73 (So.) OT; Iodence, Brian (So.) DB; Johnson, Brad (So.) C Johnson, Craig #30 (Jr.) IB; Keith, Percy #21 (Jr.) IB; Keuten, John #62 (Jr.) OG; Kirk, Donnie #13 (So.) PK; Knoll, Eric (So.) QB; Kotera, Jim #44 (Jr.) FB; Krejci, Jeff #2 (So.) DB; Kwapick, Jeff (So.) OT; Landwehr, Randy #27 (So.) IB; Larsen, Pat (So.) DB; Lee, Oudious #65 (Sr.) MG; LeRoy, Mark #23 (Sr.) DB; Letcher, Paul #8 (Sr.) DB; Lewis, Rodney #5 (So.) DB; Liegl, David #28 (Jr.) DB; Lindquist, Ric #15 (So.) DB; Lindstrom, Dan #98 (Jr.) DE; Lingenfelter, Bruce (So.) OT; Lynch, Greg (So.) OG; Mandelko, Mike #68 (So.) OG; Mathison, Bruce #19 (So.) QB; Mauer, Mark #17 (So.) QB; McCloney, Maurice #31 (So.) WB; McCrady, Tim #24 (Jr.) WB; McElroy, Mike (So.) C McWhirter, Steve #45 (Fr.) LB; Means, Andy #34 (Jr.) DB; Michaelson, Steve #18 (So.) QB; Miles, Darwin #91 (So.) DE; Miller, Junior #89 (Sr.) TE; Minor, John #86 (Sr.) MG; Moravec, Mark (So.) FB; Nelson, Derrie #92 (Jr.) DE; Noonan, John (So.) SE; Nyden, Richard (Jr.) SE; Pensick, Dan #93 (Sr.) DT	Peterson, Dick #83 (So.) TE; Phillips, Patrick #94 (So.) DE; Poppe, Scott (So.) LB; Potadle, Paul #61 (Sr.) OG; Quinn, Jeff #11 (Jr.) QB; Rabas, Greg #85 (So.) TE; Redwine, Jarvis #12 (Jr.) IB; Reiners, Dan (So.) DE; Rice, Dan #74 (Sr.) C Rimington, Dave #56 (Fr.) C Roark, Larry (So.) DB; Ruud, John #46 (Sr.) LB; Saalfeld, Kelly #57 (Sr.) C Santin, John (So.) DE; Schleusener, Randy #53 (Jr.) OG; Sculley, Mike (Jr.) MG; Searcey, L.G. #37 (So.) DB; Seibel, Kevin (Fr.) P/PK; Sims, Sammy #6 (So.) DB; Slobodnik, Tim (Fr.) DB; Smith, Tim #84 (Sr.) SE; Steels, Anthony #33 (So.) WB; Steiner, Dan #58 (Sr.) OT; Stocker, Kevin (Fr.) PK; Sukup, Dean #3 (Sr.) PK; Theiss, Randy (So.) OT; Theissen, Gordon #90 (Sr.) DE; Trent, Phil #16 (Fr.) DB; Vair, Duke (So.) IB; Van Lent, Bill (Fr.) DT; Van Norman, Kris #38 (So.) DB; Vergith, Tom (So.) WB; Vering, Tom #47 (Sr.) LB; Waechter, Henry #75 (So.) DT; Wallace, Walter (So.) IB; Wees, Dennis (So.) LB; Weinmaster, Kerry #51 (Sr.) MG; Williams, Jamie (Fr.) TE; Williams, Brent (Jr.) LB; Williams, Jimmy #96 (So.) DE; Woodard, Scott #88 (Jr.) SE; Wurth, Tim #25 (Sr.) FB

=== Depth chart ===
Defense

FS
Russell Gary
Jeff Krejci
Kris Van-Norman

INSIDE	INSIDE
Brent Williams; Tom Vering	Kim Baker
Steve McWhirter	Steve Damkroger
John Zutavern	John Ruud

MONSTER BACK
Mark Leroy
Sammy Sims
L.G. Searcey

CB
Andy Means
Dan Fischer
Rodney Lewis

DE	DT	NT	DT	DE
Derrie Nelson	Bill Barnett	Kerry Weinmater	Rod Horn	Lawrence Cole
Dan Lindstrom	Dan Pensick	Oudious Lee	David Clark	Jimmy Williams
Donnie Bess	Dave Stromath	Curt Hineline	Toby Williams	Daryl Holmes

CB
Ric Lindquist
Paul Letcher
David Liegl
⋅

Offense

SE
Tim Smith
Scott Woodard
Todd Brown

LT	LG	C	RG	RT
Mark Goodspeed	John Havekost	Kelly Saalfeld	Randy Schleusener	Dan Steiner
Gary England	Joe Adams	Jeff Bloom	Paul Potadle	Dan Hurley
Tom Carlstrom	Mike Mandelko	Trey DeLoach	Dan Rice	Peter Boll

TE
Junior Miller
Jeff Finn
Steve Davies

WB
Kenny Brown
Anthony Steels
Tim McCrady

QB
Jeff Quinn
Tim Hager
Mark Mauer

FB
Andra Franklin
Tim Wurth
Jim Kotera

Special teams
PK Dean Sukup
P Tim Smith

RB
Jarvis Redwine
I.M Hipp
Craig Johnson

== Coaching staff ==
Name	Title	First year in this position	Years at Nebraska	Alma mater
Tom Osborne	Head coach Offensive coordinator	1973	1964–1997	Hastings College
Lance Van Zandt	Defensive coordinator Defensive backs	1977	1977–1980	Lamar
Charlie McBride	Defensive line	1977	1977–1999	Colorado
Cletus Fischer	Offensive line		1960–1985	Nebraska
John Melton	Linebackers	1973	1962–1988	Wyoming
Mike Corgan	Running backs	1962	1962–1982	Notre Dame
Boyd Epley	Head strength coach	1969	1969–2003	Nebraska
George Darlington	Defensive ends		1973–2002	Rutgers
Milt Tenopir	Offensive line	1974	1974–2002	Sterling
Gene Huey	Receivers	1977	1977–1986	Wyoming
Frank Solich	Head freshman coach	1979	1979–2003	Nebraska
Jack Pierce			1979–1991	
Jake Cabell	Freshman Defensive Coordinator	1979	1979	Nebraska
Pat Fischer		1979	1979	Nebraska

== Game summaries ==
=== Utah State ===
Utah State at #8 Nebraska [box score]

Team	1	2	3	4	Total
Utah State	6	8	0	0	14
• #8 Nebraska	7	7	7	14	35

- Date: 1979-09-15
- Location: Memorial Stadium, Lincoln, Nebraska
- Game attendance: 75,953

Nebraska started out the 1979 season with less than convincing power, as relatively unheralded Utah State was still in the game as the teams entered intermission tied at 14. After adjustments were made, coaching and conditioning put the distance between the two teams as the Aggies failed to score again while the Cornhuskers added 21 with the help of 455 yards on the ground for the day.

=== Iowa ===
#7 Nebraska at Iowa [box score]

Team	1	2	3	4	Total
• #7 Nebraska	0	7	7	10	24
Iowa	7	0	14	0	21

- Date: 1979-09-22
- Location: Kinnick Stadium, Iowa City, Iowa
- Game attendance: 60,005

For the second week in a row, an unranked team came out strong against Nebraska, as Iowa scored first and held Nebraska to the 7–7 tie at the half. The situation wasn't looking up for the Cornhuskers as Iowa moved ahead to 21–14 by the end of the 3rd, but finally the Blackshirts put the brakes on Iowa's offensive output and eventually forced a fumble as the 4th quarter wound down which Nebraska successfully converted into the winning field goal before the Cornhuskers escaped Iowa City with the win.

=== Penn State ===
#18 Penn State at #6 Nebraska [box score]

Team	1	2	3	4	Total
#18 Penn State	14	0	3	0	17
• #6 Nebraska	0	28	0	14	42

- Date: 1979-09-29
- Location: Memorial Stadium, Lincoln, Nebraska
- Game attendance: 76,151

Nebraska continued their season trend of posting weak starts, as Penn State surged to a 14-point lead in the 1st quarter, but the Blackshirts seemed to figure out the Nittany Lions from that point forward, allowing only a 3rd-quarter field goal, while the Cornhusker offense came to life and put up 42 points to pass by Penn State and quell any hopes of an upset in Lincoln.

=== New Mexico State ===
New Mexico State at #5 Nebraska [box score]

Team	1	2	3	4	Total
New Mexico State	0	0	0	0	0
• #5 Nebraska	21	10	19	7	57

- Date: 1979-10-06
- Location: Memorial Stadium, Lincoln, Nebraska
- Game attendance: 76,135

This game was all Nebraska, as IB Jarvis Redwine made his first start and racked up 120 yards in just 16 carries, leaving the game before halftime. Eighty four Cornhuskers saw playing time, including some true freshmen, as Nebraska coasted to an easy 57–0 pasting of the Aggies.

=== Kansas ===
Kansas at #5 Nebraska [box score]

Team	1	2	3	4	Total
Kansas	0	0	0	0	0
• #5 Nebraska	0	15	27	0	42

- Date: 1979-10-13
- Location: Memorial Stadium, Lincoln, Nebraska
- Game attendance: 76,011

Nebraska again dominated, although the Kansas defense prevented three of four touchdown attempts in the first half and forced the Cornhuskers to settle for field goals instead. This was little help for the Jayhawks, however, who could not muster any kind of response to get onto the scoreboard. By the end of the game, Kansas had acquired only 8 first downs, 79 total yards, and suffered 3 interceptions as Nebraska's 611 offensive yards allowed them to steamroll to a 42–0 shutout victory.

=== Oklahoma State ===
#3 Nebraska at Oklahoma State [box score]

Team	1	2	3	4	Total
• #3 Nebraska	0	15	7	14	36
Oklahoma State	0	0	0	0	0

- Date: 1979-10-20
- Location: Lewis Field, Stillwater, Oklahoma
- Game attendance: 51,000

Nebraska settled into a remarkable groove, posting their 3rd straight shutout victory on the road in Stillwater. Two Nebraska runners exceeded 100 yards as the Cornhuskers rolled up 433 yards on the ground compared to only 37 by the Cowboys, who only crossed midfield twice.

=== Colorado ===
Colorado at #2 Nebraska [box score]

Team	1	2	3	4	Total
Colorado	3	7	0	0	10
• #2 Nebraska	7	10	14	7	38

- Date: 1979-10-27
- Location: Memorial Stadium, Lincoln, Nebraska
- Game attendance: 76,158

Colorado's only touchdown came on an interception return, which left intact a record 19 straight quarters that the Blackshirts had prevented a touchdown, while IB Jarvis Redwine amassed over 200 yards and three touchdowns as the Cornhuskers defeated the Buffaloes for the 12th consecutive time.

=== Missouri ===
#2 Nebraska at Missouri [box score]

Team	1	2	3	4	Total
• #2 Nebraska	7	10	3	3	23
Missouri	0	6	14	0	20

- Date: 1979-11-03
- Location: Faurot Field, Columbia, Missouri
- Game attendance: 74,575

Nebraska pulled out to an early 20–6 lead shortly after halftime, and a relatively easy win seemed to be on the horizon, but someone forgot to tell Missouri to give up. The Tigers came right back, scoring 14 straight to tie the game at 20 as the 3rd quarter ended, and the game was on. Both teams struggled to make progress until Nebraska was able to muster a single field goal with a little over 3 minutes left to play, but the game was not decided until the final play, as Missouri opted out of the easy, game-tying field goal and went for the win from the Nebraska 11 with 3 seconds left, only for QB Phil Bradley to get sacked by the Blackshirts before he could unload the ball.

=== Kansas State ===
#2 Nebraska at Kansas State [box score]

Team	1	2	3	4	Total
• #2 Nebraska	7	0	7	7	21
Kansas State	6	0	6	0	12

- Date: 1979-11-10
- Location: KSU Stadium, Manhattan, Kansas
- Game attendance: 43,210

Kansas State turned over four interceptions, but it seemed as if Nebraska was intent on repaying the favor by losing five of seven fumbles to help keep the Wildcats in the game. By the beginning of the 4th quarter, the Wildcats trailed the Cornhuskers by just 2 points. Halfway through the 4th, Nebraska put up 7 more points to create some breathing room, and held off Kansas State until time expired.

=== Iowa State ===
Iowa State at #3 Nebraska [box score]

Team	1	2	3	4	Total
Iowa State	0	0	0	3	3
• #3 Nebraska	3	25	0	6	34

- Date: 1979-11-17
- Location: Memorial Stadium, Lincoln, Nebraska
- Game attendance: 76,049

Nebraska experienced yet another slow start as the 1st quarter ended with only a Cornhusker field goal on the board, but in the second quarter things seemed to fall into place as Nebraska posted another 25 points by halftime without any response from Iowa State. The Cyclones managed to avoid the shutout with a field goal in the 4th, but avoiding the disgrace of the shutout was about all they accomplished for the day as they departed Lincoln with a 3–34 loss on the books.

=== Oklahoma ===
#3 Nebraska at #8 Oklahoma [box score]

Team	1	2	3	4	Total
#3 Nebraska	0	7	0	7	14
• #8 Oklahoma	0	3	7	7	17

- Date: 1979-11-24
- Location: Oklahoma Memorial Stadium, Norman, Oklahoma
- Game attendance: 71,187

A hard fought battle for the Big 8 title resulted in disappointment for Nebraska, who surrendered a 4-point halftime lead as Oklahoma overpowered the Blackshirts, who had been ranked #1 against the run leading up to this game. The final score of the day came from Nebraska's second-ever fumblerooski, picked up by All-American guard Randy Schleusener.

=== Houston ===
#7 Nebraska vs #8 Houston [box score]

Team	1	2	3	4	Total
#7 Nebraska	7	0	0	7	14
• #8 Houston	0	7	0	10	17

- Date: 1980-01-01
- Location: Cotton Bowl, Dallas
- Game start: 1:10 p.m. CST
- Game attendance: 72,032
- Referee: Robert Aillet
- TV announcers (CBS): Lindsey Nelson, Frank Glieber and Paul Hornung

The Cornhuskers got onto the scoreboard first with a 1st-quarter touchdown, but offensive production stalled as Houston caught up and tied the Cornhuskers before halftime. The Cougars gave up an interception and lost three of seven fumbles during the game, giving Nebraska a 4–1 turnover margin edge, but Houston's passing and rushing efforts were successful enough to overcome the setbacks. Nebraska gained a slim 3-point lead with little more than 3 minutes to play, but Houston marched down the field and put one more touchdown into the end zone with just 12 seconds on the clock, handing Nebraska a loss to close the season.

== Rankings ==
Ranking movements Legend: ██ Increase in ranking ██ Decrease in ranking
	Week														
Poll	Pre	1	2	3	4	5	6	7	8	9	10	11	12	13	Final
AP	8	8	7	6	5	5	3	2	2	2	3	3	7	7	9
Coaches															7

== Awards ==
Award	Name(s)
All-America 1st team	Junior Miller
All-America 2nd team	Mark Goodspeed, Jarvis Redwine, Kerry Weinmaster
All-America 3rd team	Kelly Saalfeld
All-America honorable mention	John Havekost, Rod Horn, Derrie Nelson, Kerry Weinmaster
Big 8 Newcomer of the Year	Jarvis Redwine
All-Big 8 1st team	Kenny Brown, John Havekost, Rod Horn, Junior Miller, Derrie Nelson, Jarvis Redwine, Kelly Saalfeld, Tim Smith, Dean Sukup, Kerry Weinmaster
All-Big 8 2nd team	Bill Barnett, Mark Goodspeed, Andy Means, Randy Schleusener, Tim Smith
All-Big 8 honorable mention	Lawrence Cole, Andra Franklin, I. M. Hipp, Mark LeRoy, Dan Steiner, Tom Vering, Brent Williams

=== NFL and pro players ===
The following Nebraska players who participated in the 1979 season later moved on to the next level and joined a professional or semi-pro team as draftees or free agents.

Name	Team
Bill Barnett	Miami Dolphins
Todd Brown	Montreal Concordes
Andra Franklin	Miami Dolphins
Russell Gary	New Orleans Saints
Mark Goodspeed	St. Louis Cardinals
Rod Horn	Cincinnati Bengals
Dan Hurley	Boston Breakers
Brad Johnson	Boston Breakers
Oudious Lee	St. Louis Cardinals
Rodney Lewis	New Orleans Saints
Allen Lyday	Houston Oilers
Bruce Mathison	San Diego Chargers
Junior Miller	Atlanta Falcons
Derrie Nelson	San Diego Chargers
Jeff Quinn	Pittsburgh Steelers
Jarvis Redwine	Minnesota Vikings
Dave Rimington	Cincinnati Bengals
Kevin Seibel	Chicago Blitz
Anthony Steels	Boston Breakers
Henry Waechter	Chicago Bears
Jamie Williams	St. Louis Cardinals
Jimmy Williams	Detroit Lions
