= 1979 Oklahoma Sooners football team =

American college football season

1979 Oklahoma Sooners football

Big 8 champion Orange Bowl champion

Orange Bowl, W 24–7 vs. Florida State
- Conference: Big Eight Conference

Ranking
- Coaches: No. 3
- AP: No. 3
- Record: 11–1 (7–0 Big 8)
- Head coach: Barry Switzer (7th season)
- Offensive coordinator: Galen Hall (7th season)
- Offensive scheme: Wishbone
- Defensive coordinator: Rex Norris (2nd season)
- Base defense: 5–2
- Captains: George Cumby; Darrol Ray; Billy Sims; Paul Tabor; Sherwood Taylor
- Home stadium: Oklahoma Memorial Stadium

1979 Big Eight Conference football standings
| | Conf. | | | | | Overall |
| Team | W | | L | | T | W | | L | | T |
|---|---|---|---|---|---|---|---|---|---|---|
| No. 3 Oklahoma $ | 7 | – | 0 | – | 0 | 11 | – | 1 | – | 0 |
| No. 9 Nebraska | 6 | – | 1 | – | 0 | 10 | – | 2 | – | 0 |
| Oklahoma State | 5 | – | 2 | – | 0 | 7 | – | 4 | – | 0 |
| Missouri | 3 | – | 4 | – | 0 | 7 | – | 5 | – | 0 |
| Colorado | 2 | – | 5 | – | 0 | 3 | – | 8 | – | 0 |
| Iowa State | 2 | – | 5 | – | 0 | 3 | – | 8 | – | 0 |
| Kansas | 2 | – | 5 | – | 0 | 3 | – | 8 | – | 0 |
| Kansas State | 1 | – | 6 | – | 0 | 3 | – | 8 | – | 0 |
$ – Conference champion; Rankings from AP Poll

The 1979 Oklahoma Sooners football team represented the University of Oklahoma in the college football 1979 NCAA Division I-A season. Oklahoma Sooners football participated in the former Big Eight Conference at that time and played its home games in Gaylord Family Oklahoma Memorial Stadium where it has played its home games since 1923. The team posted an 11–1 overall record and a 7–0 conference record to earn the Conference title outright under head coach Barry Switzer who took the helm in 1973. This was Switzer's seventh conference title and fourth undefeated conference record in seven seasons.

The team was led by All-Americans Billy Sims and George Cumby. After winning the conference title outright, it earned a trip to the Orange Bowl for a bout with Florida State. During the season, it faced three different ranked opponents (In order, #4 Texas, #3 Nebraska and #4 Florida State). All three of these opponents finished the season ranked. It endured its only defeat of the season against Texas in the Red River Shootout. The Sooners started the season with a four consecutive wins before losing to Texas and then won their remaining seven games. Sims and J.C. Watts both posted for 100-yard games in the Orange Bowl.

Sims led the nation in scoring with 138 points (based on per game average of 12.0, which includes 132 in 11 games). Sims led the team in rushing with 1670 yards, Watts led the team in passing with 821 yards, Freddie Nixon led the team in receiving with 293 yards, Cumby led the team with 160 tackles and Bud Hebert posted 4 interceptions. Billy Sims set numerous Oklahoma offensive records that still stand including career 200-yard games, single-season rushing touchdowns (tied)

== Schedule ==
| Date | Opponent | Rank | Site | TV | Result | Attendance | Source |
|---|---|---|---|---|---|---|---|
| September 15 | Iowa* | No. 3 | Oklahoma Memorial Stadium; Norman, OK | | W 21–6 | 72,531 | |
| September 22 | Tulsa* | No. 3 | Oklahoma Memorial Stadium; Norman, OK | | W 49–13 | 72,451 | |
| September 29 | at Rice* | No. 3 | Rice Stadium; Houston, TX | | W 63–21 | 30,442 | |
| October 6 | Colorado | No. 3 | Oklahoma Memorial Stadium; Norman, OK | | W 49–24 | 72,512 | |
| October 13 | vs. No. 4 Texas* | No. 3 | Cotton Bowl; Dallas, TX (rivalry) | ABC | L 7–16 | 72,032 | |
| October 20 | at Kansas State | No. 8 | KSU Stadium; Manhattan, KS | | W 38–6 | 27,257 | |
| October 27 | Iowa State | No. 7 | Oklahoma Memorial Stadium; Norman, OK | | W 38–9 | 72,069 | |
| November 3 | at Oklahoma State | No. 7 | Lewis Field; Stillwater, OK (Bedlam Series) | | W 38–7 | 51,453 | |
| November 10 | Kansas | No. 6 | Oklahoma Memorial Stadium; Norman, OK | | W 38–0 | 71,882 | |
| November 17 | at Missouri | No. 7 | Faurot Field; Columbia, MO (rivalry) | | W 24–22 | 69,973 | |
| November 24 | No. 3 Nebraska | No. 8 | Oklahoma Memorial Stadium; Norman, OK (rivalry) | ABC | W 17–14 | 72,516 | |
| January 1, 1980 | vs. No. 4 Florida State* | No. 5 | Miami Orange Bowl; Miami, FL (Orange Bowl) | NBC | W 24–7 | 66,714 | |
*Non-conference game; Rankings from AP Poll released prior to the game

== Personnel ==
1979 Oklahoma Sooners football team roster
Players
Coaches
Offense

| Pos. | # | Name | Class |
|---|---|---|---|
| G | 75 | Terry Crouch | Jr |
| OT | 59 | Darrell Irvin | Sr |
| RB | 11 | Fred Nixon | Sr |
| OT | 66 | Louis Oubre | Jr |
| HB | 22 | David Overstreet | Jr |
| QB | 7 | Kelly Phelps | So |
| SE | 24 | Steve Rhodes | Sr |
| RB | 20 | Billy Sims | Sr |
| OT | 73 | Paul Tabor | Sr |
| QB | 1 | J. C. Watts | Jr |
| G | 76 | Steve Williams | So |
| RB | 32 | Stanley Wilson | Fr |
| RB | 40 | Chet Winters | Fr |

Defense

| Pos. | # | Name | Class |
|---|---|---|---|
| DL | 36 | John Blake | Fr |
| LB | 28 | George Cumby | Sr |
| DT | 92 | Keith Gary | Jr |
| DT | 72 | John Goodman | Sr |
| DB | 6 | Steve Haworth | Fr |
| S | 33 | Bud Hebert | Sr |
| DE | 83 | Mike Joyce | Sr |
| S | 3 | Darrol Ray | Sr |
| DE | 41 | Mike Rilley | Jr |
| DT | 96 | Richard Turner | Jr |
| DE | 88 | Mike Weddington | Fr |

Special teams

| Pos. | # | Name | Class |
|---|---|---|---|
| K | 9 | John Hoge | So |
| K | 99 | Mike Keeling | Fr |

Head coach

- Barry Switzer

Coordinators/assistant coaches

- Gary Gibbs (LB)
- Galen Hall (OC)
- Warren Harper (LB)
- Merv Johnson (OL)
- Wendell Mosley (RB)
- Rex Norris (DC)
- Lucious Selmon (DL)

Legend

- (C) Team captain
- (S) Suspended
- (I) Ineligible
- Injured
- Redshirt

Roster

== Season summary ==
=== Iowa ===
Iowa Hawkeyes at #3 Oklahoma Sooners

| Quarter | 1 | 2 | 3 | 4 | Total |
|---|---|---|---|---|---|
| Iowa | 6 | 0 | 0 | 0 | 6 |
| Oklahoma | 0 | 7 | 0 | 14 | 21 |

at Oklahoma Memorial Stadium, Norman, Oklahoma

- Date: September 15
- Game attendance: 72,531

Game information
First quarter
- IOWA – Dennis Mosley 10-yard pass from Phil Seuss (kick failed). Iowa 6–0. Drive:

Second quarter

- OU – Billy Sims 1-yard run (John Hoge kick). Oklahoma 7–6. Drive:

Third quarter

- No scoring

'Fourth quarter

- OU – Billy Sims 3-yard run (John Hoge kick). Oklahoma 14–6. Drive:
- OU – J.C. Watts 1-yard run (John Hoge kick). Oklahoma 21–6. Drive:

=== Tulsa ===
Tulsa Golden Hurricane (2–1) at #3 Oklahoma Sooners (1–0)

| Quarter | 1 | 2 | 3 | 4 | Total |
|---|---|---|---|---|---|
| Tulsa | 0 | 3 | 10 | 0 | 13 |
| Oklahoma | 21 | 7 | 0 | 21 | 49 |

at Oklahoma Memorial Stadium, Norman, Oklahoma

- Date: September 22
- Game attendance: 72,451

=== At Rice ===
#3 Oklahoma Sooners (2–0) at Rice Owls (1–2)

| Quarter | 1 | 2 | 3 | 4 | Total |
|---|---|---|---|---|---|
| Oklahoma | 21 | 21 | 14 | 7 | 63 |
| Rice | 0 | 0 | 0 | 21 | 21 |

at Rice Stadium, Houston, Texas

- Date: September 29
- Game attendance: 30,442

=== Colorado ===
Colorado Buffaloes (1–3) at #3 Oklahoma Sooners (3–0)

| Quarter | 1 | 2 | 3 | 4 | Total |
|---|---|---|---|---|---|
| Colorado | 7 | 0 | 3 | 14 | 24 |
| Oklahoma | 7 | 28 | 7 | 7 | 49 |

at Oklahoma Memorial Stadium, Norman, Oklahoma

- Date: October 6
- Game attendance: 72,512

Game information
First quarter
- OU – Billy Sims 1-yard run (Mike Keeling kick). Oklahoma 7–0. Drive:
- CU – Solomon 6-yard pass from Pugh (Field kick). Tie 7–7. Drive:

Second quarter

- OU – J.C. Watts 11-yard run (Mike Keeling kick). Oklahoma 14–7. Drive:
- OU – Billy Sims 1-yard run (Mike Keeling kick). Oklahoma 21–7. Drive:
- OU – David Overstreet 1-yard run (Mike Keeling kick). Oklahoma 28–7. Drive:
- OU – Billy Sims 6-yard run (Mike Keeling kick). Oklahoma 35–7. Drive:'

Third quarter

- CU – Field 41-yard field goal. Oklahoma 35–10. Drive:
- OU – Billy Sims 1-yard run (Mike Keeling kick). Oklahoma 42-10. Drive:

Fourth quarter

- CU – Davis 11-yard run (Field kick). Oklahoma 42–17. Drive:
- OU – Winters 28-yard run (Keeling kick). Oklahoma 49–17. Drive:
- CU – Green 1-yard run (Field kick). Oklahoma 49–24. Drive:

Oklahoma faced its former coach Chuck Fairbanks for the first time since his departure following the 1972 season.

=== vs Texas ===
#3 Oklahoma Sooners (4–0) vs. #4 Texas Longhorns (3–0)

| Quarter | 1 | 2 | 3 | 4 | Total |
|---|---|---|---|---|---|
| Oklahoma | 7 | 0 | 0 | 0 | 7 |
| Texas | 3 | 7 | 0 | 6 | 16 |

at Cotton Bowl, Dallas, Texas

- Date: October 13
- Game attendance: 72,032
- TV announcers (ABC): Keith Jackson & Frank Broyles

=== At Kansas State ===
#8 Oklahoma Sooners (4–1) at Kansas State Wildcats

| Quarter | 1 | 2 | 3 | 4 | Total |
|---|---|---|---|---|---|
| Oklahoma | 3 | 0 | 14 | 21 | 38 |
| Kansas State | 0 | 6 | 0 | 0 | 6 |

at KSU Stadium, Manhattan, Kansas

- Date: October 20
- Game attendance: 27,757

Game information

First quarter

- OU – Mike Keeling 38-yard field goal. Oklahoma 3–0. Drive:

Second quarter

- KSU – Black 1-yard run (kick failed). Oklahoma 7–6. Drive:
- OU – J.C. Watts 1-yard run (Mike Keeling kick). Oklahoma 14–6. Drive:

Third quarter

- OU – J.C. Watts 18-yard run (Mike Keeling kick). Oklahoma 21–6. Drive:

Fourth quarter

- OU – Billy Sims 5-yard run (Mike Keeling kick). Oklahoma 28–6. Drive:
- OU – Phelps 14-yard run (Mike Keeling kick). Oklahoma 35–6. Drive:
- OU – Phelps 36-yard run (Mike Keeling kick). Oklahoma 42–6. Drive:

Top passers

- OU –
- KSU –

Top rushers

- OU – J.C. Watts – 118 yards, 2 TD
- KSU –

Top receivers

- OU
- KSU –

=== Iowa State ===
Iowa State Cyclones at #7 Oklahoma Sooners (5–1)

| Quarter | 1 | 2 | 3 | 4 | Total |
|---|---|---|---|---|---|
| Iowa State | 0 | 0 | 0 | 9 | 9 |
| Oklahoma | 7 | 10 | 14 | 7 | 38 |

at Oklahoma Memorial Stadium, Norman, Oklahoma

- Date: October 27
- Game attendance: 72,069

=== At Oklahoma State (Bedlam Series) ===
#7 Oklahoma Sooners (6–1) at Oklahoma State Cowboys

| Quarter | 1 | 2 | 3 | 4 | Total |
|---|---|---|---|---|---|
| Oklahoma | 24 | 7 | 7 | 0 | 38 |
| Oklahoma State | 0 | 0 | 0 | 7 | 7 |

at Lewis Field, Stillwater, Oklahoma

- Date: November 3
- Game attendance: 51,453

Game information
First quarter
- OU – Billy Sims 4-yard run (Mike Keeling kick). Oklahoma 7–0. Drive:
- OU – David Overstreet 72-yard pass from J.C. Watts (Mike Keeling kick). Oklahoma 14–0. Drive:
- OU – Billy Sims 1-yard run (Mike Keeling kick). Oklahoma 21–0. Drive:
- OU – Mike Keeling 39-yard field goal. Oklahoma 24–0. Drive:

Second quarter

- OU – Billy Sims 1-yard run (Mike Keeling kick). Oklahoma 31–0. Drive:

Third quarter

- OU – Billy Sims 11-yard run (Mike Keeling kick). Oklahoma 38–0. Drive:

Fourth quarter

- OSU – Sullentrop 2-yard run (Anderson kick). Oklahoma 38–7. Drive:

=== Kansas ===
Kansas Jayhawks at #6 Oklahoma Sooners (7–1)

| Quarter | 1 | 2 | 3 | 4 | Total |
|---|---|---|---|---|---|
| Kansas | 0 | 0 | 0 | 0 | 0 |
| Oklahoma | 3 | 7 | 7 | 21 | 38 |

at Oklahoma Memorial Stadium, Norman, Oklahoma

- Date: November 10
- Game attendance: 71,882

=== At Missouri ===
#7 Oklahoma Sooners (8–1) at Missouri Tigers

| Quarter | 1 | 2 | 3 | 4 | Total |
|---|---|---|---|---|---|
| Oklahoma | 7 | 0 | 14 | 3 | 24 |
| Missouri | 3 | 6 | 7 | 6 | 22 |

at Faurot Field, Columbia, Missouri

- Date: November 17
- Game weather: 66 °F (19 °C)
- Game attendance: 69,973
- Box Score
- Oklahoma's 100th win of the 1970s (Alabama only other school to do so)

=== Nebraska ===
#3 Nebraska Cornhuskers at #8 Oklahoma Sooners (9–1)

| Quarter | 1 | 2 | 3 | 4 | Total |
|---|---|---|---|---|---|
| Nebraska | 0 | 7 | 0 | 7 | 14 |
| Oklahoma | 0 | 3 | 7 | 7 | 17 |

at Oklahoma Memorial Stadium, Norman, Oklahoma

- Date: November 24
- Game attendance: 71,180
- TV announcers (ABC): Keith Jackson & Frank Broyles

Game information

First quarter

- No scoring

Second quarter

- OU – Mike Keeling 31-yard field goal. Oklahoma 3–0. Drive:
- NEB – Jarvis Redwine 11-yard pass from Jeff Quinn (Dean Sukup kick). Nebraska 7–3. Drive:

Third quarter

- OU – Forrest Valora 58-yard pass from J.C. Watts (Mike Keeling kick). Oklahoma 10–7. Drive:

Fourth quarter

- OU – J.C. Watts 3-yard run (Mike Keeling kick). Oklahoma 17–7. Drive:
- NEB – Randy Schleusaner 15-yard run (Dean Sukup kick). Oklahoma 17–14. Drive:

Top passers

- NEB
- OU

Top rushers

- NEB
- OU – Billy Sims – 28 rushes, 247 yards

Top receivers

- NEB
- OU

=== Orange Bowl (vs Florida State) ===
Orange Bowl: #4 Florida State Seminoles (11–0) vs. #5 Oklahoma Sooners (10–1)

| Quarter | 1 | 2 | 3 | 4 | Total |
|---|---|---|---|---|---|
| Florida State | 7 | 0 | 0 | 0 | 7 |
| Oklahoma | 0 | 17 | 0 | 7 | 24 |

at Orange Bowl, Miami, Florida

- Date: January 1, 1980
- Game attendance: 66,714
- TV announcers (NBC): Don Criqui, John Brodie, and Bob Trumpy

== Rankings ==
Ranking movements Legend: ██ Increase in ranking ██ Decrease in ranking ( ) = First-place votes
| | Week | | | | | | | | | | | | | | |
| Poll | Pre | 1 | 2 | 3 | 4 | 5 | 6 | 7 | 8 | 9 | 10 | 11 | 12 | 13 | Final |
|---|---|---|---|---|---|---|---|---|---|---|---|---|---|---|---|
| AP | 3 (4) | 3 | 3 | 3 | 3 | 3 | 8 | 7 | 7 | 6 | 7 | 8 | 5 | 5 | 3 |
| Coaches Poll | 2 (2) | 3 (3) | 3 | 3 | 3 | 3 | 8 | 9 | 7 | 7 | 7 | 7 | 4 | 5 | 3 (1) |

== Awards and honors ==
- All-American: Billy Sims, and George Cumby,
- Big 8 rushing champion: Sims
- NCAA DI scoring champion: Sims
- Big 8 Defensive Player of the Year: Cumby

== NFL draft ==
The following players were selected in the National Football League draft following the season.

Sooners who were picked in the 1980 NFL Draft:

| Round | Pick | Player | Position | NFL team |
|---|---|---|---|---|
| 1 | 1 | Billy Sims | Running back | Detroit Lions |
| 1 | 26 | George Cumby | Linebacker | Green Bay Packers |
| 2 | 40 | Darrol Ray | Safety | New York Jets |
| 2 | 56 | John Goodman | Defensive end | Pittsburgh Steelers |
| 4 | 87 | Fred Nixon | Wide receiver | Green Bay Packers |
| 5 | 130 | Paul Tabor | Center | Chicago Bears |
| 5 | 179 | Darry Hebert | Defensive back | New York Giants |
| 9 | 235 | Barry Burdet | Linebacker | New England Patriots |
| 11 | 284 | Mike Babb | Defensive back | Atlanta Falcons |
