= List of Florida State Seminoles bowl games =

The Florida State Seminoles football team competes as part of the NCAA Division I Football Bowl Subdivision (FBS), representing Florida State University in the Atlantic Division of the Atlantic Coast Conference (ACC). Since the establishment of the team in 1902, Florida State has appeared in 51 bowl games, including twenty-six combined appearances in the traditional "big six" bowl games (the Rose, Sugar, Cotton, Orange, Fiesta, and Peach). The Seminoles have made one appearance in the College Football Playoff. The Seminoles have appeared in eleven Orange Bowls, winning five of those games.

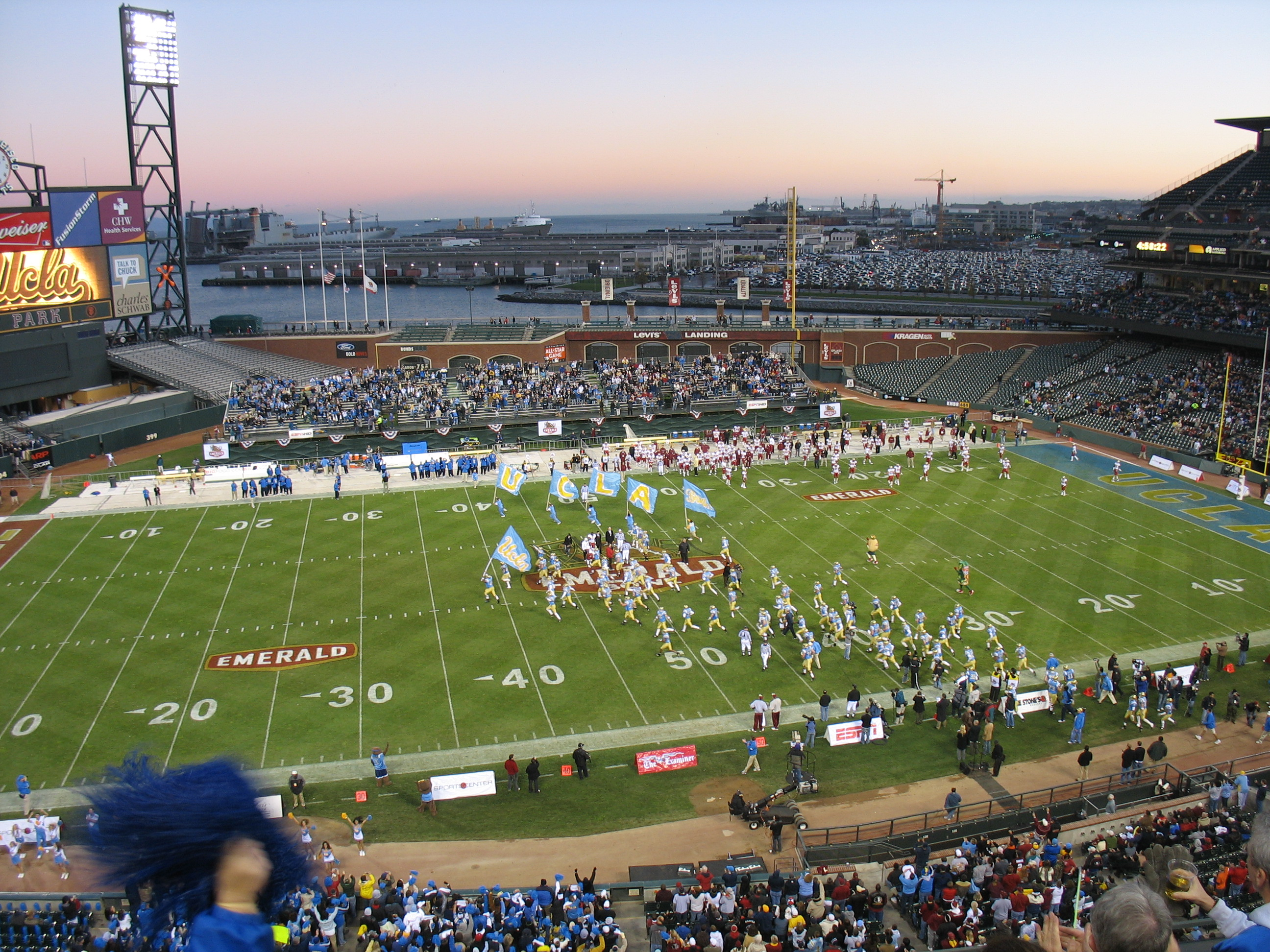
FSU vacated their appearance in the 2006 Emerald Bowl vs. UCLA.

Florida State maintains a record of 29–18–3 record in bowl games. The Seminoles played in 36 consecutive bowl games from 1982-2017.

== Bowl games ==
#	Date	Bowl	Opponent	Result
1.	November 26, 1903	Florida Times-Union’s Championship Cup	Stetson	T 5–5
2.	January 2, 1950	Cigar Bowl	Wofford	W 19–6
3.	January 1, 1955	Sun Bowl	Texas-El Paso	L 20–47
4.	December 13, 1958	Bluegrass Bowl	Oklahoma State	L 6–15
5.	January 2, 1965	Gator Bowl	Oklahoma	W 36–19
6.	December 24, 1966	Sun Bowl	Wyoming	L 20–28
7.	December 30, 1967	Gator Bowl	Penn State	T 17–17
8.	December 30, 1968	Peach Bowl	LSU	L 27–31
9.	December 23, 1971	Fiesta Bowl	Arizona State	L 38–45
10.	December 23, 1977	Tangerine Bowl	Texas Tech	W 40–17
11.	January 1, 1980	Orange Bowl	Oklahoma	L 7–24
12.	January 1, 1981	Orange Bowl	Oklahoma	L 17–18
13.	December 30, 1982	Gator Bowl	West Virginia	W 31–12
14.	December 30, 1983	Peach Bowl	North Carolina	W 28–3
15.	December 22, 1984	Citrus Bowl	Georgia	T 17–17
16.	December 30, 1985	Gator Bowl	Oklahoma State	W 34–23
17.	December 31, 1986	All-American Bowl	Indiana	W 27–13
18.	January 1, 1988	Fiesta Bowl	Nebraska	W 31–28
19.	January 2, 1989	Sugar Bowl	Auburn	W 13–7
20.	January 1, 1990	Fiesta Bowl	Nebraska	W 41–17
21.	December 28, 1990	Blockbuster Bowl	Penn State	W 24–17
22.	January 1, 1992	Cotton Bowl Classic	Texas A&M	W 10–2
23.	January 1, 1993	Orange Bowl (Bowl Coalition)	Nebraska	W 27–14
24.	January 1, 1994	Orange Bowl (Bowl Coalition National Championship)	Nebraska	W 18–16
25.	January 2, 1995	Sugar Bowl (Bowl Coalition)	Florida	W 23–17
26.	January 1, 1996	Orange Bowl (Bowl Alliance)	Notre Dame	W 31–26
27.	January 2, 1997	Sugar Bowl (Bowl Alliance National Championship)	Florida	L 20–52
28.	January 1, 1998	Sugar Bowl (Bowl Alliance)	Ohio State	W 31–14
29.	January 4, 1999	Fiesta Bowl (BCS National Championship)	Tennessee	L 16–23
30.	January 4, 2000	Sugar Bowl (BCS National Championship)	Virginia Tech	W 46–29
31.	January 3, 2001	Orange Bowl (BCS National Championship)	Oklahoma	L 2–13
32.	January 1, 2002	Gator Bowl	Virginia Tech	W 30–17
33.	January 1, 2003	Sugar Bowl (BCS)	Georgia	L 13–26
34.	January 1, 2004	Orange Bowl (BCS)	Miami	L 14–16
35.	January 1, 2005	Gator Bowl	West Virginia	W 30–18
36.	January 3, 2006	Orange Bowl (BCS)	Penn State	L 23–26
37.	December 27, 2006	Emerald Bowl	UCLA	44–27✝ (vacated)
38.	December 31, 2007	Music City Bowl	Kentucky	L 28–35
39.	December 27, 2008	Champs Sports Bowl	Wisconsin	W 42–13
40.	January 1, 2010	Gator Bowl	West Virginia	W 33–21
41.	December 31, 2010	Chick-fil-A Bowl	South Carolina	W 26–17
42.	December 29, 2011	Champs Sports Bowl	Notre Dame	W 18–14
43.	January 1, 2013	Orange Bowl (BCS)	Northern Illinois	W 31–10
44.	January 6, 2014	BCS National Championship Game	Auburn	W 34–31
45.	January 1, 2015	Rose Bowl (CFP)	Oregon	L 20–59
46.	December 31, 2015	Peach Bowl (New Year's Six)	Houston	L 24–38
47.	December 30, 2016	Orange Bowl (New Year's Six)	Michigan	W 33–32
48.	December 27, 2017	Independence Bowl	Southern Mississippi	W 42–13
49.	December 31, 2019	Sun Bowl	Arizona State	L 14–20
50.	December 29, 2022	Cheez-It Bowl	Oklahoma	W 35–32
51.	December 30, 2023	Orange Bowl (New Year’s Six)	Georgia	L 3–63

✝ Bowl win vacated due to using ineligible players

Records by Bowl Game
Bowl	Record	Appearances	Last appearance	Winning %
All-American Bowl	1–0	1	1986	1.000
Blockbuster Bowl	1–0	1	1990	1.000
Bluegrass Bowl	0–1	1	1958	.000
Champs Sports Bowl	2–0	2	2011	1.000
Cheez-It Bowl	1–0	1	2022	1.000
Cigar Bowl	1–0	1	1949	1.000
Citrus Bowl	0–0–1	1	1984	.500
Cotton Bowl	1–0	1	1991	1.000
Emerald Bowl	1–0	1	2006	1.000
Fiesta Bowl	2–2	4	1998	.500
Florida Times-Union Championship Cup	0–0–1	1	1903	.500
Gator Bowl	6–0–1	7	2009	.929
Independence Bowl	1–0	1	2017	1.000
Music City Bowl	0–1	1	2007	.000
Orange Bowl	5–6	11	2023	.455
Peach Bowl (Chick-fil-A Bowl)	2–2	4	2015	.500
Rose Bowl	1–1	2	2015	.500
Sugar Bowl	4–2	6	2002	.667
Sun Bowl	0–3	3	1966	.000
Tangerine Bowl	1–0	1	1977	1.000
