= Wade Watts =

American preacher & activist (1919–1998)

President of the Oklahoma N.A.A.C.P.
- In office 1968–1984

Personal details
- Born: 23 September 1919 Kiamichi, Oklahoma
- Died: 13 December 1998 (aged 79)
- Party: Democratic
- Profession: Preacher, Civil Rights Activist

Wade Watts (23 September 1919 – 13 December 1998) was an American gospel preacher and civil rights activist from Oklahoma. He served as the state president of the Oklahoma chapter of the NAACP for sixteen years, challenging the Ku Klux Klan through Christian love doctrine. He worked with Thurgood Marshall and developed a friendship with Martin Luther King Jr. during the American civil rights movement, and has been cited as a mentor by the current leader of the NAACP in Oklahoma, Miller Newman, and his nephew, former congressman, J. C. Watts.

== Early life ==
Wade Alexander Watts was born 23 September 1919, in Kiamichi, Oklahoma, to Charlie Alexander Watts and Mittie Harris on the hillside of the Kiamichi Mountains. The family moved to Canada, lived there five years, and then moved back to Oklahoma and settled in Eufaula.

When Wade was a young boy he reportedly made friends with a white boy and was invited to his home to play. The young boy's mother came to the door and told the boys that lunch was ready. Wade went inside and washed his hands and then proceeded to sit down at the kitchen table where he saw two plates sitting there. Wade's young friend said "You can't sit there, Wade, as those places are for me and my mama. Your lunch is outside on the back porch." Wade went outside and there was his friend's mama who handed him a dish of food. As Wade was eating a dog came up and started barking and tried to bite him. As he struggled with the dog his friend came outside and stated "The reason my dog is mad at you Wade, is because you're eating out of his dish!"

Wade joined the church at an early age. His strong drive for equality led him to join the NAACP when he was 17 years old. He received his calling to the ministry in his early 30s.

== Civil Rights work ==
Watts worked to desegregate public facilities and institutions during the 1940s and 1950s. He worked with Thurgood Marshall on the Ada Lois Sipuel challenge to segregation in the law school of the University of Oklahoma; consequently, the Supreme Court ruled in 1948, in Sipuel v. Board of Regents of Univ. of Okla., that barring Sipuel from the school was unconstitutional. In the late 1950s, Watts and Oklahoma State Senator Gene Stipe entered a restaurant. When a waitress stopped them at the door and told them that the restaurant "[did] not serve Negroes," Watts replied, "I don't eat Negroes. I just came to get some ham and eggs." He also worked to desegregate local institutions and, together with his brother, Buddy, ensured that his nephew, J.C. Watts, was one of the first black children to attend the newly integrated elementary school in their community. He rose to become the head of the NAACP in Oklahoma, and became friends with national leaders of the civil rights movement like Martin Luther King Jr.

=== Family ===
Wade spent most of his life in Pittsburg County. He married Betty Jean Garner on 11 March 1957. After the death of his first wife he then married Elizabeth Perkins. Wade was also the uncle of U.S. Congressman J. C. Watts Jr. of Oklahoma. Wade had a total of 14 children. His firstborn froze to death in the Ada, Oklahoma, hospital. One of his children was an adopted daughter who was actually his grandniece, whom J. C. fathered with a white woman while in high school.

=== NAACP ===
As the state leader of the NAACP, Watts was a target of the Ku Klux Klan and in 1979 had the opportunity to debate the Grand Dragon of the Oklahoma KKK, Johnny Lee Clary, on an Oklahoma City radio station. Clary refused to shake Watts's hand before the broadcast, but Watts shook his hand anyway and introduced himself by telling Clary that Jesus loved him. As they were leaving the radio station, Watts introduced Clary to his wife and the niece they were raising and asked Clary how he could hate the little girl, causing Clary to realize at the time that he could not. Watts reminded Clary whenever they spoke that God loved him, even responding to a threatening phone call from Clary (in which he was told that Clary and other Klansmen were coming for him) by telling Clary that it was unnecessary because he would meet Clary and buy him dinner.

The current leader of the Oklahoma NAACP, Miller Newman, considers Watts—who was pastor of the Jerusalem Baptist Church in his hometown of McAlester, Oklahoma for many years—to have had a great influence on his life.

=== Political views ===
Watts was a lifelong Democrat and took issue with his nephew's position as a national leader in the Republican party—which Watts viewed as opposing the interests of "poor people, working people, [and] common people." The nephew countered by saying his support of the Republican party stemmed from his perception that the Democrats had let his uncle down, saying that his uncle had "delivered more black votes for the Democratic Party than any black person in the state of Oklahoma," and yet it was a Republican who gave his uncle a decent job, a point his uncle conceded. Despite the disagreement, Watts still said he was proud of what his nephew had achieved, and J.C. Watts continues to express admiration for his uncle.

=== Political career ===
During his many years of community service he was appointed to the Civil Rights Commission under President Lyndon B. Johnson where he served five years. He served four years on the Oklahoma Crime Commission, five years as Chaplain at the Oklahoma State Penitentiary and Human Rights Commission. Throughout his career, he received numerous awards and commendations. He retired as Labor Inspector from the Oklahoma State Labor Commission in 1982. Although retired from an 8–5 job, he never gave up his desire for active public service. He continued to Pastor the Jerusalem Baptist Church in McAlester, Ok. until his health failed him.

Watts was a close friend of Martin Luther King Jr., and in 1965 participated with Dr. King in the march for freedom, justice, and equality in Selma, Alabama.

Watts met twice with President Jimmy Carter on civil rights issues. His speaking engagements took him to Russia, Belgium, Germany, Italy, France, and Washington D.C., where he spoke on numerous occasions, not to mention an uncountable number of engagements within his home state of Oklahoma. In 1984, he met in Frankfort, West Germany with 61 nations on providing food for the starving people in Africa. Upon returning to America, he contacted U.S. Senator David Boren and U.S. Senator Don Nickles in an attempt to gain their assistance in contacting President Ronald Reagan for his aid in sending helicopters to Africa to deliver food.
