= 1979 Colorado Buffaloes football team =

American college football season

1979 Colorado Buffaloes football
- Conference: Big Eight Conference
- Record: 3–8 (2–5 Big 8)
- Head coach: Chuck Fairbanks (1st season)
- Offensive coordinator: Doug Dickey (1st season)
- Offensive scheme: Multiple
- Defensive coordinator: Doug Knotts (1st season)
- Base defense: 3–4
- MVP: Mark Haynes
- Captains: Stan Brock; Mark Haynes; Brian McCabe; Laval Short; Bill Solomon
- Home stadium: Folsom Field

1979 Big Eight Conference football standings
	Conf.					Overall
Team	W		L		T	W		L		T
No. 3 Oklahoma $	7	–	0	–	0	11	–	1	–	0
No. 9 Nebraska	6	–	1	–	0	10	–	2	–	0
Oklahoma State	5	–	2	–	0	7	–	4	–	0
Missouri	3	–	4	–	0	7	–	5	–	0
Colorado	2	–	5	–	0	3	–	8	–	0
Iowa State	2	–	5	–	0	3	–	8	–	0
Kansas	2	–	5	–	0	3	–	8	–	0
Kansas State	1	–	6	–	0	3	–	8	–	0
$ – Conference champion; Rankings from AP Poll

The 1979 Colorado Buffaloes football team represented the University of Colorado in the Big Eight Conference during the 1979 NCAA Division I-A football season. Led by first-year head coach Chuck Fairbanks, the Buffaloes finished at 3–8 (2–5 in Big 8, tied for fifth), and played home games on campus at Folsom Field in Boulder, Colorado.

Colorados's opener against Oregon was the first college football game ever televised by ESPN. A one-point win at Indiana in the fourth game was Colorado's sole victory in their first nine; they won the final two games of the season and avoided the conference cellar.

Previously the head coach of the New England Patriots for six years, Fairbanks was hired by athletic director Eddie Crowder in mid-December 1978. Difficulties with the NFL club's ownership resulted in a legal battle until early April, when a group of CU boosters (Flatirons Club) bought out Fairbanks' contract, allowing him to leave the Patriots just days ahead of the start of the Buffs' spring practice.

== Schedule ==
Date	Opponent	Site	TV	Result	Attendance	Source
September 8	Oregon*	Folsom Field; Boulder, CO	ESPN	L 19–33	44,274	
September 15	LSU*	Folsom Field; Boulder, CO		L 0–44	46,642	
September 22	Drake*	Folsom Field; Boulder, CO		L 9–13	40,126	
September 29	at Indiana*	Memorial Stadium; Bloomington, IN		W 17–16	36,100	
October 6	at No. 3 Oklahoma	Oklahoma Memorial Stadium; Norman, OK		L 24–49	71,187	
October 20	Missouri^{†}	Folsom Field; Boulder, CO		L 7–13	51,123	
October 27	at No. 2 Nebraska	Memorial Stadium; Lincoln, NE		L 10–38	76,158	
November 3	at Iowa State	Cyclone Stadium; Ames, IA		L 10–24	47,100	
November 10	Oklahoma State	Folsom Field; Boulder, CO		L 20–21	41,148	
November 17	at Kansas	Memorial Stadium; Lawrence, KS		W 31–17	25,572–31,125	
November 24	Kansas State	Folsom Field; Boulder, CO (rivalry)		W 21–6	22,391	
*Non-conference game; ^{†}Homecoming; Rankings from AP Poll released prior to the game

== Personnel ==
=== Roster ===
1979 Colorado Buffaloes football team roster
Players			Coaches
Offense: Pos. / # / Name / Class; OT / 79 / Stan Brock (C) / Sr	Defense: Pos. / # / Name / Class; CB / 44 / Mark Haynes (C) / Sr	Special teams: Pos. / # / Name / Class	Head coach: Chuck Fairbanks (1st year); Coordinators/assistant coaches: Doug Dickey (OC); Doug Knotts (DC); Ron Marciniak (OL); Legend: (C) Team captain; (S) Suspended; (I) Ineligible; Injured; Redshirt; Roster

=== Starters ===
- Offense: QB Bill Solomon, HB Lance Olander/Charles Davis, FB Willie Beebe, SE Donnie Holmes, WB Kazell Pugh, TE Bob Niziolek/Greg Willett/Doug Krahenbuhl, LT Stan Brock, LG Paul Butero, C Roger Gunter/Bob Sebro, RG Art Dale Johnson/Guy Thurston, RT Karry Kelley
- Defense: LE George Visger, NT Laval Short, RE Kevin Sazama, OLB Steve Doolittle, ILB Bill Roe, ILB Charles Scott, OLB Brian McCabe/Bob Humble, LCB Mark Haynes, SS Mike E. Davis, FS Tim Roberts, RCB Jesse Johnson/Tim Stampley
- Specialists: K Tom Field, P Lance Olander
