= The Day I Met God =

- Author: Karen Covell, Victorya Michaels Rogers, Jim Covell
- Language: English
- Subject: Christian biography
- Publisher: Multnomah
- Publication date: July 30, 2001
- Publication place: United States
- Media type: Print
- ISBN: 1-57673-786-1
- OCLC: 46353297
- Dewey Decimal: 248.2/4/0922 21
- LC Class: BV4908.5 .C68 2001

The Day I Met God is a 2001 book of stories about people (mainly Americans) who converted to Christianity.

Publishers Weekly wrote:

- This collection of conversion stories drawn from many walks of life will appeal to anyone fascinated by the variety of human and religious experience. However, it might better be titled "The Day I Accepted Christ," since it dwells exclusively on born-again Christian conversions. Of the 32 stories compiled here, the majority were contributed by individuals who eventually found their home in Hollywood (as have all three authors at one time or another) and who have since become involved in public ministry.

People profiled in book (partial list):

- Randy Travis - Country-Western singer
- Johnny Lee Clary - former Ku Klux Klan leader

== See also ==
- The Varieties of Religious Experience
