= Monte Bennett =

American gridiron football player (born 1959)

Monte Lewis Bennett
No. 91, 62, 69
- Positions: Nose tackle, defensive end

Personal information
- Born: April 27, 1959 (age 67); Sterling, Kansas, U.S.
- Listed height: 6 ft 3 in (1.91 m)
- Listed weight: 265 lb (120 kg)

Career information
- High school: Sterling
- College: Kansas State
- NFL draft: 1981: undrafted

Career history
- New Orleans Saints (1981); Oakland Invaders (1983-1985); San Diego Chargers (1987); Atlanta Falcons (1988)*
- * Offseason or practice squad member only

Career NFL statistics
- Games played: 19
- Games started: 6
- Stats at Pro Football Reference

Monte Lewis Bennett (born April 27, 1959) is an American former professional football player who was a defensive end and nose tackle in the National Football League (NFL) and United States Football League (USFL). He played college football for the Kansas State Wildcats. Bennett played in the NFL for the New Orleans Saints in 1981. He played in the USFL for three seasons with the Oakland Invaders. Bennett played in the 1985 USFL championship game. After three years in the USFL. Bennett returned for another season in the NFL playing with the San Diego Chargers in 1987.

Bennett wore #91 while playing for the Invaders.

== Early life ==
Monte was born in Sterling, Colorado. His family moved to Sterling, Kansas, almost a year later. He attended Sterling High School.

== College ==
Monte attended Kansas State University from 1977 to 1981. He played Nose Tackle in college.

== Professional career ==
Monte went undrafted in the 1981 Draft, with teammate Stevan Dion Clark being picked up by the New England Patriots. He was signed by the New Orleans Saints in 1981 and played in all 16 games, starting 6 of them. At the end of the year, he was cut. In 1987, at the age of 28, he was signed by the San Diego Chargers, who switched him from Nose tackle to Defensive end. He only played 3 games that year before being cut.
