= 1979 Missouri Tigers football team =

American college football season

1979 Missouri Tigers football

Hall of Fame Classic, W 24–14 vs. South Carolina
- Conference: Big Eight Conference

Ranking
- Coaches: No. 20
- Record: 7–5 (3–4 Big 8)
- Head coach: Warren Powers (2nd season)
- Defensive coordinator: Carl Reese (3rd season)
- Home stadium: Memorial Stadium

1979 Big Eight Conference football standings
	Conf.					Overall
Team	W		L		T	W		L		T
No. 3 Oklahoma $	7	–	0	–	0	11	–	1	–	0
No. 9 Nebraska	6	–	1	–	0	10	–	2	–	0
Oklahoma State	5	–	2	–	0	7	–	4	–	0
Missouri	3	–	4	–	0	7	–	5	–	0
Colorado	2	–	5	–	0	3	–	8	–	0
Iowa State	2	–	5	–	0	3	–	8	–	0
Kansas	2	–	5	–	0	3	–	8	–	0
Kansas State	1	–	6	–	0	3	–	8	–	0
$ – Conference champion; Rankings from AP Poll

The 1979 Missouri Tigers football team was an American football team that represented the University of Missouri in the Big Eight Conference (Big 8) during the 1979 NCAA Division I-A football season. The team compiled a 7–5 record (3–4 against Big 8 opponents), finished in fourth place in the Big 8, and was outscored by opponents by a combined total of 260 to 166. Warren Powers was the head coach for the second of seven seasons. The team played its home games at Faurot Field in Columbia, Missouri.

The team's statistical leaders included James Wilder with 645 rushing yards, Phil Bradley with 1,448 passing yards and 1,764 yards of total offense, Andy Gibler with 316 receiving yards, and Gerry Ellis with 54 points scored.

== Schedule ==
Date	Opponent	Rank	Site	Result	Attendance	Source
September 8	San Diego State*	No. 12	Faurot Field; Columbia, MO	W 45–15	62,168	
September 15	at Illinois*	No. 11	Memorial Stadium; Champaign, IL (rivalry)	W 14–6	49,049	
September 22	at Ole Miss*	No. 9	Mississippi Veterans Memorial Stadium; Jackson, MS	W 33–7	46,000	
September 29	No. 4 Texas*	No. 5	Faurot Field; Columbia, MO	L 0–21	75,136	
October 13	Oklahoma State	No. 15	Faurot Field; Columbia, MO	L 13–14	66,003	
October 20	at Colorado		Folsom Field; Boulder, CO	W 13–7	51,123	
October 27	Kansas State		Faurot Field; Columbia, MO	L 3–19	70,029	
November 3	No. 2 Nebraska		Faurot Field; Columbia, MO (rivalry)	L 20–23	74,575	
November 10	at Iowa State		Cyclone Stadium; Ames, IA (rivalry)	W 18–9	46,800	
November 17	No. 7 Oklahoma		Faurot Field; Columbia, MO (rivalry)	L 22–24	69,973	
November 24	at Kansas		Memorial Stadium; Lawrence, KS (Border War)	W 55–7	34,599	
December 29	vs. No. 16 South Carolina*		Legion Field; Birmingham, AL (Hall of Fame Classic)	W 24–14	62,785	
*Non-conference game; Rankings from AP Poll released prior to the game

== Personnel ==
1979 Missouri Tigers football team roster
Players
Coaches
Offense

Pos.	#	Name	Class
WR	82	Ken Blair	Jr
QB	15	Phil Bradley	Jr
C	55	Brad Edelman	So
RB	43	Gerry Ellis	Sr
WR	8	Ron Fellows	Jr
WR	83	Andy Gibler	Fr
RB	32	James Wilder	Jr

Defense

Pos.	#	Name	Class
LB	34	Lester Dickey	Jr
DB	29	Demetrious Johnson	Fr
DE	88	Kurt Peterson	Sr
CB	9	Johnnie Poe	Jr
SS	18	Kevin Potter	Fr
DE	90	Wendell Ray	Jr
DT	56	Jerome Sally	So
DT	92	Bennie Smith	So
DE	96	Ray Stephens	Jr
CB	30	Bill Whitaker	Jr
FS	21	Eric Wright	Jr

Special teams

Pos.	#	Name	Class
K	3	Jeff Brockhaus	Jr
K	1	Ron Verrilli

Head coach

- Warren Powers

Coordinators/assistant coaches

- Mike Price – Quarterback/wide receiver
- Billy Thornton – Running backs
- Dick Beechner – Tight ends/special teams coordinator
- John Faiman – Offensive line
- Carl Reese – Defensive coordinator
- George Wheeler – Defensive tackles
- Zaven Yaralian – Defensive backs
- Mark Heydorff – Assistant

Legend

- (C) Team captain
- (S) Suspended
- (I) Ineligible
- Injured
- Redshirt
