= 1979 Hall of Fame Classic =

Missouri Tigers	South Carolina Gamecocks
(6–5)	(8–3)
24	14
Head coach: Warren Powers	Head coach: Jim Carlen
	AP / Coaches; 16 / 16
	1	2	3	4	Total
Missouri	0	17	7	0	24
South Carolina	6	0	8	0	14
- Date: December 29, 1979
- Season: 1979
- Stadium: Legion Field
- Location: Birmingham, Alabama
- MVP: QB Phil Bradley (Missouri)
- Referee: James Garvey (ECAC)
- Attendance: 62,785

United States TV coverage
- Network: Mizlou Television Network
- Announcers: Ray Scott, Don Perkins and Howard David

The 1979 Hall of Fame Classic was a college football postseason bowl game that featured the South Carolina Gamecocks and the Missouri Tigers.

== Background ==
Missouri had finished 4th in the Big Eight Conference, in their second straight bowl appearance, and first consecutive span of bowl appearance since 1972-73. South Carolina was in a bowl game for the 2nd bowl appearance in four years. The Gamecocks won 8 games in the regular season for the first time since 1903.

== Game summary ==
Phil Bradley went 7-of-11 for 72 yards, with a passing and rushing touchdowns, in an MVP effort. For South Carolina, George Rogers rushed for 133 yards on 15 carries.

=== Scoring summary ===
- South Carolina – McKinney 20 yard touchdown pass from Harper (run failed)
- Missouri – 22 yard field goal by Ron Verrilli
- Missouri – Newman 28 pass from Bradley (Verrilli kick)
- Missouri – Bradley 1 run (Verrilli kick)
- South Carolina – Harper 11 run (McKinney pass from Harper)
- Missouri – Gerry Ellis 12 run (Verrilli kick)

== Aftermath ==
The Gamecocks won 8 games the following season, but lost again in a bowl, this time to Pittsburgh in the Gator Bowl. It would take 15 years (during which they joined the Southeastern Conference in 1992) to win their first bowl game. As for the Tigers, they would go to three more bowl games in the span of four years, though the 1983 Holiday Bowl remained their last bowl until 1997. The two teams met up again in the 2005 Independence Bowl, seven years before Missouri joined the Southeastern Conference. Coincidentally, Missouri was placed in the same division as South Carolina, and both schools compete every season for the Mayor's Cup.

== Statistics ==
Statistics	Missouri	South Carolina
First downs	17	20
Rushing yards	209	142
Passing yards	72	121
Return yards	8	1
Passes	7–11–0	13–20–1
Punts–average	6–44.3	6–35
Fumbles–lost	2–1	1–1
Penalties–yards	5–50	1–16
