= Fred Nixon =

American football player (born 1958)

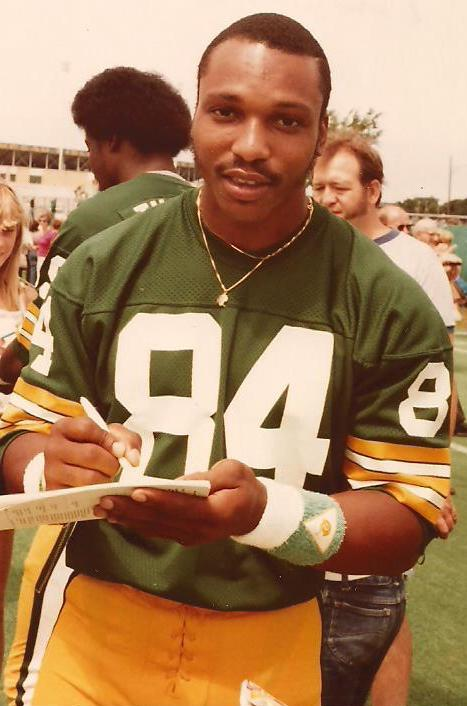
- Nixon in 1981

No. 84
- Position: Wide receiver

Personal information
- Born: September 22, 1958 (age 68); Camilla, Georgia, U.S.
- Listed height: 5 ft 11 in (1.80 m)
- Listed weight: 191 lb (87 kg)

Career information
- High school: Carol City (Miami Gardens, Florida)
- College: Oklahoma
- NFL draft: 1980: 4th round, 87th overall pick

Career history
- Green Bay Packers (1980–1982); Oklahoma Outlaws (1984)*; Orlando Renegades (1985)*
- * Offseason or practice squad member only

Awards and highlights
- First-team All-Big Eight (1977)

Career NFL statistics
- Games played: 23
- Receptions: 6
- Receiving yards: 105
- Stats at Pro Football Reference

Frederick Lenar Nixon (born September 22, 1958) is an American former professional football player who was a wide receiver in the National Football League (NFL).

== Biography ==
Nixon was born Frederick Lenar Nixon on September 22, 1958, in Camilla, Georgia. He attended Miami Carol City Senior High School in Miami Gardens, Florida.

== College career ==
He played at the collegiate level at the University of Oklahoma.

== Professional career ==
=== Green Bay Packers ===
Nixon was selected by the Green Bay Packers in the fourth round of the 1980 NFL draft and played two seasons with the team. He returned for a third season, but was placed on the injured reserve list with a stress fracture of the foot on August 24, 1982, through the entire 1982 season. The Packers released him on March 2, 1983.

=== Oklahoma Outlaws ===
Nixon signed with the Oklahoma Outlaws of the USFL on October 11, 1983. On January 26, 1984, while at training camp in Tampa, Florida he was hospitalized with heat exhaustion. Shortly after his illness, Nixon retired from the team.

=== Orlando Renegades ===
Nixon signed with the Orlando Renegades of the USFL in November 1984.
