= Stevan Clark =

American football player (born 1959)

Steve Clark
No. 65
- Position: Defensive end

Personal information
- Born: October 29, 1959 (age 67); Chattanooga, Tennessee, U.S.
- Listed height: 6 ft 5 in (1.96 m)
- Listed weight: 258 lb (117 kg)

Career information
- High school: Mifflin (Columbus, Ohio)
- College: Kansas State
- NFL draft: 1981: 5th round, 130th overall pick

Career history
- New England Patriots (1981–1982)

Career NFL statistics
- Games played: 7
- Stats at Pro Football Reference

Stevan Dion Clark (born October 29, 1959) is a former National Football League (NFL) defensive end who played for the New England Patriots in the 1981 and 1982 seasons.

== Early life ==
Clark was born in Chattanooga, Tennessee. He attended Miffin High School in Columbus, Ohio.

== College ==
Clark went to Kansas State University. As a freshman and sophomore, he played defensive tackle; however, Clark switched to defensive end for his junior and senior years. In 1980, as a senior, he had 68 tackles and four sacks. He earned Player-of-the-week honors vs. Iowa State on October 11, 1980 with 14 tackles, one sack, and one fumble recovery. After his senior season, he appeared in the 1980 Blue/Gray Game and the 1981 Senior Bowl.

He graduated in spring 1981 with a degree in elementary education.

== Professional career ==
In April 1981, he was drafted in the 5th round (pick 130) of the NFL Draft by the New England Patriots. He was placed on injured reserve on September 1, 1981, but was reactivated a month later and saw special teams duty and some DE time before injuring his left knee in a late season 19–10 loss to the Buffalo Bills. He was replaced on injured reserve on December 16, 1981. Coaches and teammates said he had great speed and was an excellent pass rusher and would most likely compete for a starting job in the 1982 season. After a 2–14 rookie year and a new coaching staff in 1982, Clark was moved from defensive end to add depth to the Patriot offensive line. During the strike-shortened 1982 season, Clark saw limited regular season action. Clark returned to the Patriots in 1983 and appeared in all four pre-season games before being waived in September. He signed with the San Francisco 49ers in February 1984; however, a knee injury in camp that summer ended his career.
