= 1979 NFL draft =

National Football League draft

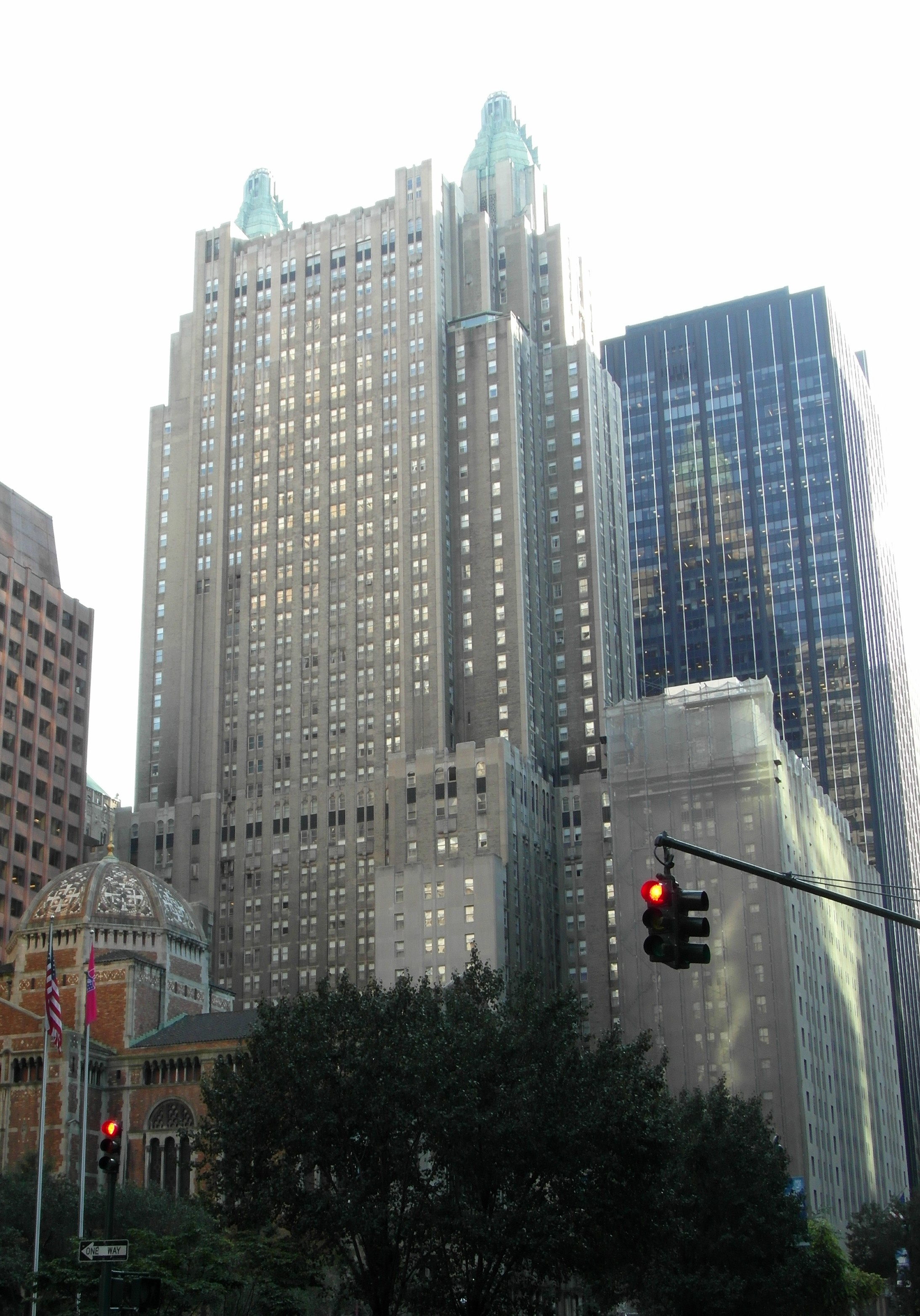
- Waldorf Astoria (location of the draft), photographed in 2012

General information
- Date: May 3–4, 1979
- Location: Waldorf Astoria Hotel in New York City, New York

Overview
- 330 total selections in 12 rounds
- League: NFL
- First selection: Tom Cousineau, LB; Buffalo Bills
- Mr. Irrelevant: Mike Almond, WR; Pittsburgh Steelers
- Most selections (17): New York Jets
- Fewest selections (5): Washington Redskins
- Hall of Famers: 4: DT Dan Hampton; TE Kellen Winslow; QB Joe Montana; LB Bill Cowher

The 1979 NFL draft was the procedure by which National Football League teams selected amateur college football players. It is officially known as the NFL Annual Player Selection Meeting. The draft was held May 3–4, 1979, at the Waldorf Astoria Hotel in New York City, New York. The league also held a supplemental draft after the regular draft and before the regular season.

The Buffalo Bills held the first overall pick in the draft, acquired from the San Francisco 49ers in the trade which sent O. J. Simpson to his hometown team. The Bills' selection at No. 1, Ohio State linebacker Tom Cousineau, refused to sign with the Bills and instead signed a lucrative deal with the Montreal Alouettes of the Canadian Football League.

== Player selections ==
*	= compensatory selection
†	= Pro Bowler
‡	= Hall of Famer

Positions key
Offense	Defense	Special teams
QB — Quarterback; RB — Running back; FB — Fullback; WR — Wide receiver; TE — Tight end; OL — Offensive lineman; T — Tackle; G — Guard; C — Center	DL — Defensive lineman; DT — Defensive tackle (Note: Includes nose tackle (NT)); DE — Defensive end; EDGE — Edge rusher; LB — Linebacker (Note: Includes middle linebacker (MLB/MIKE), weakside linebacker (WILL), strongside linebacker (SAM), off-ball linebacker, and outside linebacker (OLB)); DB — Defensive back; CB — Cornerback; S — Safety (Note: Includes free safety (FS) and strong safety (SS))	K — Kicker (Note: Also known as a placekicker (PK)); P — Punter; LS — Long snapper; RS — Return specialist (Note: Includes kickoff and punt returners)

Rnd.	Pick	Team	Player	Pos.	College	Notes
1	1	Buffalo Bills	Tom Cousineau	LB	Ohio State	from San Francisco
1	2	Kansas City Chiefs	Mike Bell	DE	Colorado State	
1	3	Cincinnati Bengals	Jack Thompson	QB	Washington State	
1	4	Chicago Bears	Dan Hampton^{‡}^{†}	DT	Arkansas	from Tampa Bay
1	5	Buffalo Bills	Jerry Butler ^{†}	WR	Clemson	
1	6	Baltimore Colts	Barry Krauss	LB	Alabama	
1	7	New York Giants	Phil Simms ^{†}	QB	Morehead State	
1	8	St. Louis Cardinals	Ottis Anderson ^{†}	RB	Miami (FL)	
1	9	Chicago Bears	Al Harris	DE	Arizona State	
1	10	Detroit Lions	Keith Dorney ^{†}	T	Penn State	
1	11	New Orleans Saints	Russell Erxleben	K	Texas	
1	12	Cincinnati Bengals	Charles Alexander	RB	LSU	from Washington
1	13	San Diego Chargers	Kellen Winslow^{‡}^{†}	TE	Missouri	from Cleveland
1	14	New York Jets	Marty Lyons	DE	Alabama	
1	15	Green Bay Packers	Eddie Lee Ivery	RB	Georgia Tech	
1	16	Minnesota Vikings	Ted Brown	RB	NC State	
1	17	Atlanta Falcons	Don Smith	DE	Miami (FL)	
1	18	Seattle Seahawks	Manu Tuiasosopo	DT	UCLA	
1	19	Los Angeles Rams	George Andrews	LB	Nebraska	from Oakland
1	20	Cleveland Browns	Willis Adams	WR	Houston	from San Diego
1	21	Philadelphia Eagles	Jerry Robinson ^{†}	LB	UCLA	
1	22	Denver Broncos	Kelvin Clark	T	Nebraska	
1	23	Kansas City Chiefs	Steve Fuller	QB	Clemson	from Houston
1	24	Miami Dolphins	Jon Giesler	T	Michigan	
1	25	New England Patriots	Rick Sanford	CB	South Carolina	
1	26	Los Angeles Rams	Kent Hill ^{†}	T	Georgia Tech	
1	27	Dallas Cowboys	Robert Shaw	C	Tennessee	
1	28	Pittsburgh Steelers	Greg Hawthorne	RB	Baylor	
2	29	San Francisco 49ers	James Owens	WR	UCLA	
2	30	Cincinnati Bengals	Dan Ross ^{†}	TE	Northeastern	
2	31	Houston Oilers	Mike Stensrud	DT	Iowa State	from Kansas City
2	32	Buffalo Bills	Fred Smerlas ^{†}	DT	Boston College	
2	33	Tampa Bay Buccaneers	Greg Roberts	G	Oklahoma	from Baltimore
2	34	Tampa Bay Buccaneers	Gordon Jones	WR	Pittsburgh	
2	35	St. Louis Cardinals	Theotis Brown	RB	UCLA	
2	36	New York Giants	Earnest Gray	WR	Memphis State	
2	37	Detroit Lions	Ken Fantetti	LB	Wyoming	
2	38	New Orleans Saints	Reggie Mathis	LB	Oklahoma	
2	39	Chicago Bears	Rickey Watts	WR	Tulsa	
2	40	Cleveland Browns	Lawrence Johnson	CB	Wisconsin	
2	41	New York Jets	Mark Gastineau ^{†}	DE	East Central	
2	42	Oakland Raiders	Willie Jones	DE	Florida State	from Washington via St. Louis
2	43	Minnesota Vikings	Dave Huffman	C	Notre Dame	
2	44	Green Bay Packers	Steve Atkins	RB	Maryland	
2	45	Seattle Seahawks	Joe Norman	LB	Indiana	
2	46	St. Louis Cardinals	Calvin Favron	LB	Southeastern Louisiana	from Oakland
2	47	Cleveland Browns	Sam Claphan	T	Oklahoma	from San Diego
2	48	Philadelphia Eagles	Petey Perot	G	Northwestern State	from San Diego
2	49	Atlanta Falcons	Pat Howell	G	USC	
2	50	Houston Oilers	Jesse Baker	DE	Jacksonville State	
2	51	Buffalo Bills	Jim Haslett	LB	IUP	from Denver
2	52	New England Patriots	Bob Golic ^{†}	DT	Notre Dame	
2	53	Miami Dolphins	Jeff Toews	T	Washington	
2	54	Los Angeles Rams	Eddie Hill	RB	Memphis State	
2	55	Dallas Cowboys	Aaron Mitchell	CB	UNLV	
2	56	Pittsburgh Steelers	Zack Valentine	LB	East Carolina	
3	57	Seattle Seahawks	Michael Jackson	LB	Washington	from San Francisco
3	58	Los Angeles Rams	Jeff Moore	WR	Tennessee	from Kansas City
3	59	Cincinnati Bengals	Barney Cotton	G	Nebraska	
3	60	Tampa Bay Buccaneers	Jerry Eckwood	RB	Arkansas	from Baltimore
3	61	Miami Dolphins	Tony Nathan	RB	Alabama	
3	62	Buffalo Bills	Jon Borchardt	T	Montana State	
3	63	Miami Dolphins	Mel Land	LB	Michigan State	from N. Y. Giants
3	64	St. Louis Cardinals	Joe Bostic	T	Clemson	
3	65	Miami Dolphins	Ronnie Lee	TE	Baylor	from New Orleans
3	66	Chicago Bears	Willie McClendon	RB	Georgia	
3	67	Detroit Lions	Bo Robinson	RB	West Texas State	
3	68	New York Jets	Donald Dykes	CB	Southeastern Louisiana	
3	69	Baltimore Colts	Kim Anderson	S	Arizona State	from Washington via Houston
3	70	Cleveland Browns	James Ramey	DE	Kentucky	
3	71	Green Bay Packers	Charles Johnson	DT	Maryland	
3	72	Houston Oilers	Kenny King ^{†}	RB	Oklahoma	from Oakland via Baltimore
3	73	San Diego Chargers	Clifford Thrift	LB	East Central	
3	74	Philadelphia Eagles	Tony Franklin ^{†}	K	Texas A&M	
3	75	Atlanta Falcons	James Mayberry	RB	Colorado	
3	76	Dallas Cowboys	Doug Cosbie ^{†}	TE	Santa Clara	from Seattle
3	77	Denver Broncos	Bruce Radford	DE	Grambling State	
3	78	Tampa Bay Buccaneers	Reginald Lewis	DE	North Texas	from Houston
3	79	Atlanta Falcons	William Andrews ^{†}	RB	Auburn	from Miami
3	80	Tampa Bay Buccaneers	Rick Berns	RB	Nebraska	from Los Angeles via Washington thorough Miami and Oakland
3	81	Los Angeles Rams	Mike Wellman	C	Kansas	from New England
3	82	San Francisco 49ers	Joe Montana^{‡}^{†}	QB	Notre Dame	
3	–	Pittsburgh Steelers	Selection forfeited when the team was found to have practiced with pads during an off-season period when pads were not allowed			
4	83	Buffalo Bills	Ken Johnson	DE	Knoxville	from San Francisco
4	84	Cincinnati Bengals	James White	DT	Albany State	
4	85	Kansas City Chiefs	Frank Manumaleuga	LB	San Jose State	
4	86	Pittsburgh Steelers	Russell Davis	RB	Michigan	from Tampa Bay via Detroit
4	87	Buffalo Bills	Jeff Nixon	S	Richmond	
4	88	Detroit Lions	Ulysses Norris	TE	Georgia	from Baltimore
4	89	St. Louis Cardinals	Roy Green ^{†}	DB	Henderson State	
4	90	New York Giants	Phil Tabor	DE	Oklahoma	
4	91	Cincinnati Bengals	Vaughn Lusby	CB	Arkansas	from Chicago
4	92	Detroit Lions	Jon Brooks	LB	Clemson	
4	93	New Orleans Saints	Jim Kovach	LB	Kentucky	
4	94	Philadelphia Eagles	Ben Cowins	RB	Arkansas	from Washington
4	95	Cleveland Browns	Matt Miller	T	Colorado	
4	96	New York Jets	Eric Cunningham	G	Penn State	
4	97	Minnesota Vikings	Steve Dils	QB	Stanford	
4	98	New York Jets	Johnny Lynn	CB	UCLA	from Green Bay
4	99	Los Angeles Rams	Derwin Tucker	DB	Illinois	from San Diego
4	100	Atlanta Falcons	Lynn Cain	RB	USC	from Philadelphia
4	101	Atlanta Falcons	Charles Johnson	CB	Grambling State	
4	102	Seattle Seahawks	Mark Bell	TE	Colorado State	
4	103	Washington Redskins	Don Warren	TE	San Diego State	from Oakland via Green Bay
4	104	San Diego Chargers	John Floyd	WR	Northeast Louisiana	from Houston
4	105	Denver Broncos	Charles Jefferson	DB	McNeese State	
4	106	New England Patriots	Eddie Hare	P	Tulsa	
4	107	Miami Dolphins	Steve Howell	RB	Baylor	
4	108	Los Angeles Rams	Jerry Wilkinson	DT	Oregon State	
4	109	Dallas Cowboys	Ralph DeLoach	DE	California	
4	110	Pittsburgh Steelers	Calvin Sweeney	WR	USC	
5	111	San Francisco 49ers	Tom Seabron	LB	Michigan	
5	112	Kansas City Chiefs	Earl Gant	RB	Missouri	
5	113	Cincinnati Bengals	Casey Merrill	DE	UC Davis	
5	114	Buffalo Bills	Rod Kush	S	Nebraska–Omaha	
5	115	Baltimore Colts	Larry Braziel	CB	USC	
5	116	Buffalo Bills	Dan Manucci	QB	Kansas State	from Tampa Bay via Seattle
5	117	New York Giants	Cleveland Jackson	TE	UNLV	
5	118	St. Louis Cardinals	Steve Henry	DB	Emporia State	
5	119	San Francisco 49ers	Jerry Aldridge	RB	Angelo State	from Detroit
5	120	New Orleans Saints	Harlan Huckleby	RB	Michigan	
5	121	Dallas Cowboys	Bob Hukill	G	North Carolina	from Chicago
5	122	Los Angeles Rams	Victor Hicks	TE	Oklahoma	from Cleveland
5	123	New York Jets	Kelly Kirchbaum	LB	Kentucky	
5	124	Cleveland Browns	Rich Dimler	DT	USC	from Washington via Los Angeles
5	125	New York Jets	Stan Blinka	LB	Sam Houston	from Green Bay
5	126	Philadelphia Eagles	Scott Fitzkee	WR	Penn State	
5	127	Atlanta Falcons	Mike Zele	DT	Kent State	
5	128	Dallas Cowboys	Curtis Anderson	DE	Central State (OH)	
5	129	Minnesota Vikings	Jerry Meter	LB	Michigan	
5	130	St. Louis Cardinals	Mark Bell	WR	Colorado State	from Oakland
5	131	Detroit Lions	Walt Brown	C	Pittsburgh	from San Diego via Los Angeles
5	132	Denver Broncos	Rick Leach	QB	Michigan	
5	133	Tampa Bay Buccaneers	Chuck Fusina	QB	Penn State	from Houston
5	134	Miami Dolphins	Don Bessillieu	S	Georgia Tech	
5	135	New England Patriots	John Zamberlin	LB	Pacific Lutheran	
5	136	Dallas Cowboys	Ron Springs	RB	Ohio State	
5	137	Pittsburgh Steelers	Dwaine Board	DE	North Carolina A&T	
6	138	San Francisco 49ers	Ruben Vaughan	DT	Colorado	
6	139	Cincinnati Bengals	Steve Kreider	WR	Lehigh	
6	140	Kansas City Chiefs	Spider Gaines	WR	Washington	
6	141	Buffalo Bills	Mike Burrow	G	Auburn	from Baltimore
6	142	Oakland Raiders	Ira Matthews	RB	Wisconsin	from Tampa Bay
6	143	Houston Oilers	Daryl Hunt	LB	Oklahoma	from Buffalo
6	144	St. Louis Cardinals	Thomas Lott	RB	Oklahoma	
6	145	New York Giants	Bob Torrey	RB	Penn State	
6	146	New Orleans Saints	Ricky Ray	DB	Norfolk State	
6	147	Chicago Bears	John Sullivan	LB	Illinois	
6	148	Denver Broncos	Jeff McIntyre	LB	Arizona State	from Detroit
6	149	New York Jets	Bill Dufek	G	Michigan	
6	150	Baltimore Colts	Jim Moore	T	Ohio State	from Washington
6	151	Cleveland Browns	Clinton Burrell	DB	LSU	
6	152	Minnesota Vikings	Joe Senser ^{†}	TE	West Chester	
6	153	Green Bay Packers	Dave Simmons	LB	North Carolina	
6	154	Atlanta Falcons	Mike Moroski	QB	UC Davis	
6	155	Dallas Cowboys	Tim Lavender	DB	USC	from Seattle
6	156	Oakland Raiders	Henry Williams	CB	San Diego State	
6	157	Pittsburgh Steelers	Bill Murrell	TE	Winston-Salem State	from San Diego
6	158	New York Giants	Eddie Hicks	RB	East Carolina	from Philadelphia
6	159	Houston Oilers	Mike Murphy	LB	SW Missouri State	
6	160	Dallas Cowboys	Mike Salzano	G	North Carolina	from Denver
6	161	Pittsburgh Steelers	Dwayne Woodruff	CB	Louisville	from New England
6	162	Miami Dolphins	Steve Lindquist	G	Nebraska	
6	163	Cleveland Browns	Jim Ronan	DT	Minnesota	from Los Angeles
6	164	Dallas Cowboys	Chris DeFrance	WR	Arizona State	
6	165	Pittsburgh Steelers	Matt Bahr	K	Penn State	
7	166	San Francisco 49ers	Phil Francis	RB	Stanford	
7	167	Kansas City Chiefs	Ken Kremer	DE	Ball State	
7	168	Cincinnati Bengals	Max Montoya ^{†}	G	UCLA	
7	169	Seattle Seahawks	Larry Polowski	LB	Boise State	from Tampa Bay via Washington
7	170	Buffalo Bills	Tom Mullady	TE	Rhodes	
7	171	Houston Oilers	Tim Ries	DB	SW Missouri State	from Baltimore
7	172	New York Giants	Steve Alvers	TE	Miami (FL)	
7	173	St. Louis Cardinals	Kirk Gibson	WR	Michigan State	
7	174	Chicago Bears	Lee Kunz	LB	Nebraska	
7	175	Oakland Raiders	Jack Matia	T	Drake	from Detroit via Cleveland
7	176	New Orleans Saints	Stan Sytsma	LB	Minnesota	
7	177	New England Patriots	Judson Flint	FS	Memphis State	from Washington
7	178	Philadelphia Eagles	Don Swafford	T	Florida	from Cleveland
7	179	New York Jets	Emmett King	RB	Houston	
7	180	Green Bay Packers	Henry Monroe	DB	Mississippi State	
7	181	Minnesota Vikings	Bob Winkel	DT	Kentucky	
7	182	Washington Redskins	Rich Milot	LB	Penn State	from Seattle
7	183	Cleveland Browns	Cody Risien ^{†}	T	Texas A&M	from Oakland
7	184	Green Bay Packers	Rich Wingo	LB	Alabama	from San Diego
7	185	Philadelphia Eagles	Curtis Bunche	DE	Albany State	
7	186	Atlanta Falcons	Roger Westlund	T	Washington	
7	187	New York Jets	Keith Brown	DB	Minnesota	from Houston
7	188	Denver Broncos	Luke Prestridge ^{†}	P	Baylor	
7	–	New England Patriots	The New England Patriots forfeited their 1979 seventh round pick by the NFL office for an illegal tryout			
7	189	Miami Dolphins	Uwe von Schamann	K	Oklahoma	
7	190	Los Angeles Rams	Jeff Delaney	S	Pittsburgh	
7	191	Dallas Cowboys	Greg Fitzpatrick	LB	Youngstown State	
7	192	Pittsburgh Steelers	Bruce Kimball	G	UMass	
8	193	Green Bay Packers	Ron Cassidy	WR	Utah State	from San Francisco
8	194	Cincinnati Bengals	Howie Kurnick	LB	Cincinnati	
8	195	Kansas City Chiefs	Mike Williams	RB	New Mexico	
8	196	Philadelphia Eagles	Chuck Correal	C	Penn State	from Buffalo
8	197	Baltimore Colts	Steve Heimkreiter	LB	Notre Dame	
8	198	New York Jets	Marshall Harris	DT	TCU	from Tampa Bay
8	199	St. Louis Cardinals	Larry Miller	LB	BYU	
8	200	New York Giants	D. K. Perry	DB	SMU	
8	201	New York Giants	Roy Simmons	G	Georgia Tech	from Detroit
8	202	New Orleans Saints	Doug Panfil	G	Tulsa	
8	203	Chicago Bears	Rick Moss	DB	Purdue	
8	204	Cleveland Browns	Kent Perkow	DE	San Diego State	
8	205	New York Jets	Willie Beamon	LB	Boise State	
8	206	Miami Dolphins	Jeff Groth	WR	Bowling Green	from Washington
8	207	Baltimore Colts	Nesby Glasgow	S	Washington	from Minnesota
8	208	Green Bay Packers	Rick Partridge	P	Utah	
8	209	Oakland Raiders	Robert Hawkins	RB	Kentucky	
8	210	San Diego Chargers	Wilbert Haslip	RB	Hawaii	
8	211	Philadelphia Eagles	Max Runager	P	South Carolina	
8	212	Atlanta Falcons	Keith Miller	LB	N.E. Oklahoma	
8	213	Detroit Lions	John Mohring	LB	C. W. Post	from Seattle
8	214	Houston Oilers	Carter Hartwig	CB	USC	
8	215	Miami Dolphins	Glenn Blackwood	S	Texas	from Denver
8	216	New England Patriots	Randy Love	RB	Houston	
8	217	Tampa Bay Buccaneers	Gene Sanders	DT	Texas A&M	from Miami
8	218	Kansas City Chiefs	Robert Brewer	G	Temple	from Los Angeles via St. Louis
8	219	Dallas Cowboys	Bruce Thornton	DT	Illinois	
8	220	Pittsburgh Steelers	Tom Graves	LB	Michigan State	
9	221	San Francisco 49ers	Steve Hamilton	DT	Missouri	
9	222	Kansas City Chiefs	James Folston	TE	Cameron	
9	223	Cincinnati Bengals	Scott Burk	S	Oklahoma State	
9	224	Baltimore Colts	Russ Henderson	P	Virginia	
9	225	Tampa Bay Buccaneers	Henry Vereen	WR	UNLV	
9	226	Buffalo Bills	Keven Baker	DE	William Penn	
9	227	New York Giants	Tom Rusk	LB	Iowa	
9	228	St. Louis Cardinals	Bob Rozier	DE	California	
9	229	Kansas City Chiefs	Joe Robinson	T	Ohio State	from New Orleans
9	230	Chicago Bears	Jerome Heavens	RB	Notre Dame	
9	231	Detroit Lions	Jeff Komlo	QB	Delaware	
9	232	New York Jets	Gordy Sprattler	RB	North Dakota State	
9	233	Washington Redskins	Kris Haines	WR	Notre Dame	
9	234	Cleveland Browns	Carl McGee	LB	Duke	
9	235	Green Bay Packers	John Thompson	TE	Utah State	
9	236	Minnesota Vikings	Billy Diggs	WR	Winston-Salem State	
9	237	San Diego Chargers	Alvin Garrett	WR	Angelo State	
9	238	Oakland Raiders	Jim Rourke	T	Boston College	from Philadelphia
9	239	Atlanta Falcons	Dave Parkin	FS	Utah State	
9	240	Seattle Seahawks	Ezra Tate	RB	Mississippi College	
9	241	Cleveland Browns	Curtis Weathers	TE	Ole Miss	from Oakland
9	242	Denver Broncos	Charlie Taylor	WR	Rice	
9	243	Houston Oilers	Richard Ellender	WR	McNeese State	
9	244	Miami Dolphins	Jeff Weston	DT	Notre Dame	
9	245	New England Patriots	John Spagnola	TE	Yale	
9	246	Los Angeles Rams	Jeff Rutledge	QB	Alabama	
9	247	Dallas Cowboys	Garry Cobb	LB	USC	
9	248	Pittsburgh Steelers	Rick Kirk	DE	Denison	
10	249	San Francisco 49ers	Dwight Clark ^{†}	WR	Clemson	
10	250	Cincinnati Bengals	Nathan Poole	RB	Louisville	
10	251	Kansas City Chiefs	Mike DuPree	LB	Florida	
10	252	San Francisco 49ers	Howard Ballage	DB	Colorado	
10	253	Buffalo Bills	Dave Marler	QB	Mississippi State	
10	254	Baltimore Colts	Steve Stephens	TE	Oklahoma State	
10	255	St. Louis Cardinals	Jerry Holloway	TE	Western Illinois	
10	256	New York Giants	Dan Fowler	G	Kentucky	
10	257	Chicago Bears	Joe Restic	DB	Notre Dame	
10	258	Miami Dolphins	Jerome Stanton	DB	Michigan State	
10	259	Oakland Raiders	Ricky Smith	DB	Tulane	
10	260	Kansas City Chiefs	Gerald Jackson	DB	Mississippi State	
10	261	Cleveland Browns	John Smith	WR	Tennessee State	
10	262	New York Jets	Steve Sybeldon	T	North Dakota	
10	263	New York Jets	Ed McGlasson	C	Youngstown State	
10	264	Green Bay Packers	Frank Lockett	WR	Nebraska	
10	265	San Diego Chargers	Tony Petruccio	DT	Penn State	
10	266	Atlanta Falcons	Bruce Beekley	LB	Oregon	
10	267	Seattle Seahawks	Robert Hardy	DT	Jackson State	
10	268	Kansas City Chiefs	Larry Willis	WR	Alcorn State	
10	269	San Diego Chargers	Al Green	DB	LSU	
10	–	Houston Oilers	The Houston Oilers forfeited their 1979 tenth round pick after selecting Johnnie Dirden in the 1978 Supplemental draft			
10	270	New England Patriots	Martin Cox	WR	Vanderbilt	
10	271	New England Patriots	Allan Clark	RB	Northern Arizona	
10	272	Miami Dolphins	Mike Kozlowski	RB	Colorado	
10	273	Los Angeles Rams	Grady Ebensberger	DT	Houston	
10	274	Dallas Cowboys	Mike Calhoun	DT	Notre Dame	
10	275	Pittsburgh Steelers	Tod Thompson	TE	BYU	
11	276	San Francisco 49ers	Billy McBride	DB	Tennessee State	
11	277	Kansas City Chiefs	Stan Rome	WR	Clemson	
11	278	Cincinnati Bengals	Ken Bungarda	DE	Missouri	
11	279	Buffalo Bills	Paul Lawler	DB	Colgate	
11	280	Baltimore Colts	John Priestner	LB	Western Ontario	
11	281	Tampa Bay Buccaneers	Bob Rippentrop	TE	Fresno State	
11	282	New York Giants	Mike Mince	DB	Fresno State	
11	283	St. Louis Cardinals	Nate Henderson	T	Florida State	
11	284	New York Giants	Ken Johnson	RB	Miami (FL)	
11	285	New Orleans Saints	David Hall	WR	Missouri–Rolla	
11	286	Chicago Bears	Bob Wright	T	Cincinnati	
11	287	Cleveland Browns	Randy Poeschl	DE	Nebraska	
11	288	New York Jets	Danny Sanders	QB	Carson–Newman	
11	289	Washington Redskins	Monte Coleman	LB	Central Arkansas	
11	290	Green Bay Packers	Mark Thorson	DB	Ottawa (KS)	
11	291	Minnesota Vikings	Brian Nelson	WR	Texas Tech	
11	292	Atlanta Falcons	Bill Leer	C	Colorado State	
11	293	Seattle Seahawks	Jim Hinesly	G	Michigan State	
11	294	Oakland Raiders	Bruce Davis	T	UCLA	
11	295	San Diego Chargers	Dave Rader	QB	Tulsa	
11	296	Philadelphia Eagles	Al Chesley	LB	Pittsburgh	
11	297	Denver Broncos	Zach Dixon	RB	Temple	
11	298	Houston Oilers	Mike Taylor	T	Georgia Tech	
11	299	Miami Dolphins	Mike Blanton	DE	Georgia Tech	
11	300	Washington Redskins	Tony Hall	WR	Knoxville	
11	301	Los Angeles Rams	Jesse Deremus	DT	Tennessee State	
11	302	Detroit Lions	Eddie Cole	LB	Ole Miss	
11	303	Pittsburgh Steelers	Charlie Moore	C	Wichita State	
12	–	San Francisco 49ers	The San Francisco 49ers forfeited their 1979 twelfth round pick after selecting Rod Conners in the 1978 Supplemental draft			
12	304	Cincinnati Bengals	Jim Browner	DB	Notre Dame	
12	305	Kansas City Chiefs	Michael Forrest	RB	Arkansas	
12	306	Baltimore Colts	Charlie Green	WR	Kansas State	
12	307	Tampa Bay Buccaneers	David Logan ^{†}	DT	Pittsburgh	
12	308	Buffalo Bills	Mike Harris	RB	Arizona State	
12	309	St. Louis Cardinals	Rick McBride	LB	Georgia	
12	310	New York Giants	Tim Gillespie	G	NC State	
12	311	New Orleans Saints	Kelsey Finch	RB	Tennessee	
12	312	Chicago Bears	Dave Becker	DB	Iowa	
12	313	Detroit Lions	Bob Forster	C	Brown	
12	314	New York Jets	Paul Darby	WR	Southwest Texas State	
12	315	Cleveland Browns	Dewitt Methvin	C	Tulane	
12	316	Oakland Raiders	Dirk Abernathy	DB	Bowling Green	
12	317	Minnesota Vikings	David Stephens	LB	Kentucky	
12	318	Green Bay Packers	Bill Moats	P	South Dakota	
12	319	Seattle Seahawks	Jeff Moore	RB	Jackson State	
12	320	Oakland Raiders	Reggie Kinlaw	DT	Oklahoma	
12	321	San Diego Chargers	Frank Duncan	DB	San Francisco State	
12	322	Pittsburgh Steelers	Ed Smith	LB	Vanderbilt	
12	323	Atlanta Falcons	Stuart Walker	LB	Colorado	
12	324	Houston Oilers	Wayne Wilson	RB	Shepherd	
12	325	Denver Broncos	Dave Jacobs	K	Syracuse	
12	326	Detroit Lions	Brian Sweeney	WR	Texas A&I	
12	327	Miami Dolphins	Larry Fortner	QB	Miami (OH)	
12	328	Los Angeles Rams	Drew Hill ^{†}	WR	Georgia Tech	
12	329	Dallas Cowboys	Quentin Lowry	LB	Youngstown State	
12	330	Pittsburgh Steelers	Mike Almond	WR	Northwestern State	

== Supplemental draft ==
Rnd.	Pick	Team	Player	Pos.	College	Notes
6		Buffalo Bills	Rod Stewart	RB	Kentucky	

== Hall of Famers ==
- Kellen Winslow, tight end from Missouri, taken 1st round 13th overall by San Diego Chargers

Inducted: Professional Football Hall of Fame class of 1995.

- Joe Montana, quarterback from Notre Dame, taken 3rd round 82nd overall by San Francisco 49ers

Inducted: Professional Football Hall of Fame class of 2000.

- Dan Hampton, defensive tackle from Arkansas, taken 1st round 4th overall by Chicago Bears

Inducted: Professional Football Hall of Fame class of 2002.

- Bill Cowher, linebacker from North Carolina State, undrafted and signed by Philadelphia Eagles

Inducted: For his Coaching achievements Professional Football Hall of Fame Class of 2020.

== Notable undrafted players ==
†	= Pro Bowler	^{‡}	Hall of Famer

Original NFL team	Player	Pos.	College	Notes
Atlanta Falcons	Putt Choate	LB	SMU	
Atlanta Falcons	Frank Garcia	P	Arizona State	
Atlanta Falcons	Russ Mikeska	TE	Texas A&M	
Atlanta Falcons	Don Patterson	CB	Georgia Tech	
Buffalo Bills	Chris Keating	LB	Maine	
Buffalo Bills	Jeff Knapple	QB	Northern Colorado	
Cleveland Browns	Dino Hall	RB	Glassboro State	
Dallas Cowboys	Adger Armstrong	FB	Texas A&M	
Dallas Cowboys	Steve Wilson	CB	Howard	
Denver Broncos	James Harrell	LB	Florida	
Denver Broncos	Jim Ryan	LB	William & Mary	
Denver Broncos	Vince Thompson	RB	Villanova	
Denver Broncos	Wylie Turner	CB	Angelo State	
Denver Broncos	Steve Watson ^{†}	WR	Temple	
Detroit Lions	John Arnold	WR	Wyoming	
Green Bay Packers	Bobby Kimball	WR	Oklahoma	
Houston Oilers	Chuck Brown	C	Houston	
Kansas City Chiefs	M. L. Carter	CB	San Jose State	
Kansas City Chiefs	Steve Gaunty	WR	Northern Colorado	
Los Angeles Rams	Ivory Sully	S	Delaware	
Miami Dolphins	Cleveland Green	T	Southern	
Miami Dolphins	Joel Williams	LB	Wisconsin–La Crosse	
Minnesota Vikings	Douglas Cunningham	WR	Rice	
Minnesota Vikings	Keith Nord	S	St. Cloud State	
Minnesota Vikings	Tony Norman	DE	Iowa State	
New England Patriots	Mark Buben	DE	Tufts	
New England Patriots	Ken Talton	RB	Cornell	
New Orleans Saints	Vickey Ray Anderson	RB	Oklahoma	
New York Giants	Saladin Martin	CB	San Diego State	
New York Giants	Joe McLaughlin	LB	UMass	
New York Jets	Woody Bennett	RB	Miami	
New York Jets	Mike McKibben	LB	Kent State	
Oakland Raiders	Joe Bell	DE	Norfolk State	
Oakland Raiders	Rufus Bess	CB	South Carolina State	
Philadelphia Eagles	Bill Cowher^{‡}	LB	NC State	
Philadelphia Eagles	Steve Kenney	G	Clemson	
Philadelphia Eagles	Al Latimer	CB	Clemson	
Pittsburgh Steelers	Anthony Anderson	RB	Temple	
San Francisco 49ers	Dan Melville	P	California	
Seattle Seahawks	Mark Stevenson	G/C	Western Illinois	
St. Louis Cardinals	Chris Garlich	LB	Missouri	
St. Louis Cardinals	Jeff Lee	WR	Nebraska	
St. Louis Cardinals	Leo Lewis	WR	Missouri	
St. Louis Cardinals	Mike Loyd	QB	Missouri Southern	
Tampa Bay Buccaneers	George Yarno	G	Washington State	
Washington Redskins	Neal Olkewicz	LB	Maryland	
Washington Redskins	Ray Waddy	CB	Texas A&I	
