= 1979 Cleveland Browns season =

NFL team season

- Owner: Art Modell
- Head coach: Sam Rutigliano
- Home stadium: Cleveland Municipal Stadium

Results
- Record: 9–7
- Division place: 3rd AFC Central
- Playoffs: Did not qualify
- All-Pros: TE Ozzie Newsome {2nd Team); QB Brian Sipe {2nd Team); FS Thom Darden {2nd Team)
- Pro Bowlers: C Tom De Leone; FB Mike Pruitt

The 1979 Cleveland Browns season was the team's 30th season with the National Football League.

== Season summary ==
In a season which could be titled "The Birth of The Kardiac Kids" the Browns, who finished 9–7, nearly made the playoffs while involved in a number of close games. They won their first three contests, all by three points, over the New York Jets in overtime 25–22, Kansas City Chiefs 27–24 and Baltimore Colts 13–10. They lost to the Washington Redskins by four points, 13–9, midway through the season, then beat the Cincinnati Bengals by one, 28–27, the following Sunday and the Philadelphia Eagles by five, 24–19, two weeks later. The Browns proceeded to lose to the Seattle Seahawks by five points, 29–24, beat the Miami Dolphins by six, 30–24, in overtime and lost to the Pittsburgh Steelers by three, 33–30, again in OT. That was the last of the Browns three overtime games that season. Then came a virtual "blowout" – a seven-point victory over the Houston Oilers, 14–7. Followed by two "one-sided" losses, by five points to the Oakland Raiders, 19–14, and by four to the Bengals, 16–12, to end the year. Add it all up, and 12 of the Browns' 16 games were decided by seven points or less. The club went just 7–5 in those games, though, which was the difference in that season from 1980, when the Browns were 10–2 in 12 contests decided by seven points or less.

How tight was the 1979 season overall for the Browns? So much so that they outscored their foes by just seven points all year. The Browns moved to 4–0 – their fastest start since 1963 – by stunning heavily favored Dallas 26–7 on Monday Night Football. The Browns gave up 51 points at home to the Steelers, who would go on to win their second straight Super Bowl and fourth in six years, yet scored 35 on the vaunted Steel Curtain defense and lost by 16. The game was shown on national TV, but NBC cut away to another contest, leaving only the Pittsburgh and Cleveland markets watching, after the Steelers vaulted to a 27–0 lead.

RB Mike Pruitt rushed for 1,294 yards and nine TDs, while wideout Dave Logan led the team in catches with 59 and missed getting 1,000 receiving yards by just 18. Logan, TE Ozzie Newsome and veteran WR Reggie Rucker combined for 22 TD catches.

== Offseason ==
=== NFL draft ===
The following were selected in the 1979 NFL draft.

1979 Cleveland Browns draft
Round	Selection	Player	Position	College	Notes
1	20	Willis Adams	Wide receiver	Houston	
2	40	Lawrence Johnson	Defensive back	Wisconsin	
2	47	Sam Claphan	Offensive tackle	Oklahoma	
3	70	Jim Ramey	Defensive end	Kentucky	
4	95	Matt Miller	Offensive tackle	Colorado	
5	124	Rich Dimler	Defensive tackle	USC	
6	151	Clinton Burrell	Defensive back	LSU	
6	163	Jim Ronan	Defensive tackle	Minnesota	
7	183	Cody Risien	Offensive tackle	Texas A&M	
8	204	Kent Perkov	Defensive end	San Diego State	
9	234	Carl McGee	Linebacker	Duke	
9	241	Curtis Weathers	Linebacker	Mississippi	
10	261	John Henry Smith	Wide receiver	Tennessee State	
11	287	Randy Poeschl	Defensive end	Nebraska	
12	315	Dee Methvin	Center	Tulane	

=== Undrafted free agents ===
1979 undrafted free agents of note
Player	Position	College
Edward Delgado	Kicker	Georgetown

== Staff / Coaches ==
1979 Cleveland Browns staff
Front office: President and owner – Art Modell; Assistant to the president – Peter Hadhazy; Head coaches: Head coach – Sam Rutigliano; Offensive coaches: Quarterbacks – Jim Shofner; Running backs – Jim Garrett; Receivers – Rich Kotite; Offensive line – Rod Humenuik	Defensive coaches: Defensive coordinator – Marty Schottenheimer; Defensive line – Dick Modzelewski; Linebackers – Dave Adolph; Special teams coaches: Special teams – Al Tabor & John Petercuskie; Strength and conditioning: Director of Pro Personnel - Allan Webb; Film Coordinator - Ed Ulinski; Athletic Trainer - Leo Murphy

== Roster ==
1979 Cleveland Browns roster
Quarterbacks: 15 Mark Miller; 17 Brian Sipe; Running backs: 20 Doug Dennison; 25 Pat Moriarty; 26 Dino Hall; 30 Cleo Miller; 35 Calvin Hill; 43 Mike Pruitt; Wide receivers: 33 Reggie Rucker; 80 Willis Adams; 83 Ricky Feacher; 85 Dave Logan; 88 John Smith; Tight ends: 82 Ozzie Newsome; 87 Curtis Weathers	Offensive linemen: 54 Tom DeLeone C; 63 Cody Risien G; 64 George Buehler G; 65 Henry Sheppard T; 68 Robert Jackson G; 71 Matt Miller T; 73 Doug Dieken T; 79 Gerry Sullivan T/C; Defensive linemen: 74 Mike St. Clair DT; 77 Lyle Alzado DE; 78 Mickey Sims DT; 81 Jack Gregory DE; 91 Henry Bradley DT; 92 Rich Dimler DT	Linebackers: 47 Ricky Jones OLB; 52 Dick Ambrose MLB; 55 Dave Graf OLB; 56 Robert Jackson MLB; 57 Clay Matthews OLB; 59 Charlie Hall OLB; 86 Gerald Irons OLB; Defensive backs: 21 Oliver Davis CB; 22 Clarence Scott SS; 24 Randy Rich CB; 27 Thom Darden FS; 28 Ron Bolton CB; 48 Lawrence Johnson CB; 49 Clinton Burrell CB; Special teams: 8 Johnny Evans P/QB; 12 Don Cockroft K	Reserve lists: -- Rickey Anderson RB (IR); 60 Sam Claphan T (IR); 34 Greg Pruitt RB (IR); 99 Kent Perkov DE (IR); 61 Jim Ronan DT (IR); 72 Jerry Sherk DT (IR); 89 Keith Wright WR (IR); rookies in italics

== Regular season ==
=== Schedule ===
Week	Date	Opponent	Result	Record	Venue	Attendance	Recap
1	September 2	at New York Jets	**W** 25–22 (OT)	1–0	Shea Stadium	48,272	Recap
2	September 9	at Kansas City Chiefs	**W** 27–24	2–0	Arrowhead Stadium	42,181	Recap
3	September 16	Baltimore Colts	**W** 13–10	3–0	Cleveland Municipal Stadium	72,070	Recap
4	September 24	Dallas Cowboys	**W** 26–7	4–0	Cleveland Municipal Stadium	80,123	Recap
5	September 30	at **Houston Oilers**	**L** 10–31	4–1	Houston Astrodome	48,915	Recap
6	October 7	**Pittsburgh Steelers**	**L** 35–51	4–2	Cleveland Municipal Stadium	81,260	Recap
7	October 14	Washington Redskins	**L** 9–13	4–3	Cleveland Municipal Stadium	63,323	Recap
8	October 21	**Cincinnati Bengals**	**W** 28–27	5–3	Cleveland Municipal Stadium	75,119	Recap
9	October 28	at St. Louis Cardinals	**W** 38–20	6–3	Busch Memorial Stadium	47,845	Recap
10	November 4	at Philadelphia Eagles	**W** 24–19	7–3	Veterans Stadium	69,019	Recap
11	November 11	Seattle Seahawks	**L** 24–29	7–4	Cleveland Municipal Stadium	72,440	Recap
12	November 18	Miami Dolphins	**W** 30–24 (OT)	8–4	Cleveland Municipal Stadium	80,374	Recap
13	November 25	at **Pittsburgh Steelers**	**L** 30–33 (OT)	8–5	Three Rivers Stadium	49,112	Recap
14	December 2	**Houston Oilers**	**W** 14–7	9–5	Cleveland Municipal Stadium	69,112	Recap
15	December 9	at Oakland Raiders	**L** 14–19	9–6	Oakland–Alameda County Coliseum	52,641	Recap
16	December 16	at **Cincinnati Bengals**	**L** 12–16	9–7	Riverfront Stadium	42,183	Recap
Note: Intra-division opponents are in **bold** text.

=== Standings ===
AFC Central
	W	L	T	PCT	DIV	CONF	PF	PA	STK
^{(2)} Pittsburgh Steelers	12	4	0	.750	4–2	9–3	416	262	W1
^{(4)} Houston Oilers	11	5	0	.688	4–2	9–3	362	331	L1
Cleveland Browns	9	7	0	.563	2–4	6–6	359	352	L2
Cincinnati Bengals	4	12	0	.250	2–4	2–10	337	421	W1

== Awards and records ==
- Brian Sipe: NFL Co-Leader, Touchdown Passes (28) (Note: Tied with New England's Steve Grogan)
