= Joseph Bell (disambiguation) =

Joseph Bell (1837–1911) was a Scottish lecturer and inspiration for the literary character Sherlock Holmes.

Joseph or Joe Bell may also refer to:

== Politics and law ==
- Joseph Bell (Mississippi politician) (c. 1811–1885), American politician; secretary of state of Mississippi
- Joseph M. Bell (1787–1851), Massachusetts lawyer, abolitionist, and politician
- Joseph Nicholas Bell (1864–1922), British Labour politician and Justice of the Peace

== Sports ==
- Joseph Bell (rugby union) (1899–1963), New Zealand rugby union player
- Joe Bell (ice hockey) (1923–2014), Canadian ice hockey player
- Joe Bell (baseball) (fl. 1932), American baseball player
- Joseph-Antoine Bell (born 1954), Cameroonian football goalkeeper
- Joe Bell (American football) (born 1957), American football player
- Joe Bell (footballer) (born 1999), New Zealand footballer

== Others ==
- Joseph Bell (engineer) (1861–1912), British chief engineer of RMS Titanic
- Joe Bell (1964–2013), American anti-bullying crusader; father of Jadin Bell

== Other uses ==
- Joe Bell (film), 2020 film about the American anti-bullying crusader
- Joe Bell site, American archaeological site in Morgan County, Georgia
