= 1978 Tennessee Volunteers football team =

American college football season

1978 Tennessee Volunteers football
- Conference: Southeastern Conference
- Record: 5–5–1 (3–3 SEC)
- Head coach: Johnny Majors (2nd season)
- Offensive coordinator: Joe Avezzano (2nd season)
- Defensive coordinator: Bobby Roper (2nd season)
- Captains: Robert Shaw; Dennis Wolfe
- Home stadium: Neyland Stadium

1978 Southeastern Conference football standings
	Conf.					Overall
Team	W		L		T	W		L		T
No. 1 Alabama $	6	–	0	–	0	11	–	1	–	0
No. 16 Georgia	5	–	0	–	1	9	–	2	–	1
Auburn	3	–	2	–	1	6	–	4	–	1
LSU	3	–	3	–	0	8	–	4	–	0
Tennessee	3	–	3	–	0	5	–	5	–	1
Florida	3	–	3	–	0	4	–	7	–	0
Mississippi State	2	–	4	–	0	6	–	5	–	0
Ole Miss	2	–	4	–	0	5	–	6	–	0
Kentucky	2	–	4	–	0	4	–	6	–	1
Vanderbilt	0	–	6	–	0	2	–	9	–	0
$ – Conference champion; Rankings from AP Poll

The 1978 Tennessee Volunteers football team (variously "Tennessee", "UT" or the "Vols") represented the University of Tennessee in the 1978 NCAA Division I-A football season. Playing as a member of the Southeastern Conference (SEC), the team was led by head coach Johnny Majors, in his second year, and played their home games at Neyland Stadium in Knoxville, Tennessee. They finished the season with a record of five wins, five losses and one tie (5–5–1 overall, 3–3 in the SEC).

== Schedule ==
Date	Opponent	Site	TV	Result	Attendance	Source
September 16	No. 9 UCLA*	Neyland Stadium; Knoxville, TN		L 0–13	85,897	
September 23	Oregon State*	Neyland Stadium; Knoxville, TN		T 13–13	82,048	
September 30	at Auburn	Legion Field; Birmingham, AL	ABC	L 10–29	50,136	
October 7	Army*	Neyland Stadium; Knoxville, TN		W 31–13	81,887	
October 21	No. 4 Alabama	Neyland Stadium; Knoxville, TN (Third Saturday in October)		L 17–30	85,436	
October 28	vs. Mississippi State	Liberty Bowl Memorial Stadium; Memphis, TN		L 21–34	40,879	
November 4	Duke*	Neyland Stadium; Knoxville, TN		W 34–0	83,098	
November 11	at No. 14 Notre Dame*	Notre Dame Stadium; Notre Dame, IN		L 14–31	59,075	
November 18	Ole Miss^{†}	Neyland Stadium; Knoxville, TN (rivalry)		W 41–17	83,210	
November 24	Kentucky	Neyland Stadium; Knoxville, TN (rivalry)		W 29–14	84,926	
December 2	at Vanderbilt	Dudley Field; Nashville, TN (rivalry)		W 41–15	35,263	
*Non-conference game; ^{†}Homecoming; Rankings from AP Poll released prior to the game

== Team players drafted into the NFL ==
Player	Position	Round	Pick	NFL club
Robert Shaw	Center	1	27	Dallas Cowboys
Jeff Moore	Wide receiver	3	58	Los Angeles Rams
Kelsey Finch	Running back	12	311	New Orleans Saints
