= Bill Lamb (politician) =

American politician

Member of the Alabama House of Representatives from the 62nd district
- Incumbent
- Assumed office November 9, 2022
- Preceded by: Rich Wingo

Personal details
- Party: Republican
- Education: University of Alabama

Bill Lamb is an American politician who has served as a Republican member of the Alabama House of Representatives since November 8, 2022. He represents Alabama's 62nd House district.

== Electoral history ==
He was elected on November 8, 2022, in the 2022 Alabama House of Representatives election against Democratic opponent Brenda Cephus. He assumed office the next day on November 9, 2022.

== Biography ==
Lamb graduated from the University of Alabama. He has worked as the chief financial officer of Tuscaloosa County, Alabama for 39 years and retired from that position in 2021.

Alabama House of Representatives
Preceded by Rich Wingo	Member of the Alabama House of Representatives; 2022–present	Succeeded by incumbent
