= Mike Calhoun =

American gridiron football player (1957–1997)

No. 70, 60
- Position: Defensive tackle

Personal information
- Born: May 6, 1957; Youngstown, Ohio, U.S.
- Died: August 23, 1997 (aged 40); Akron, Ohio, U.S.
- Listed height: 6 ft 4 in (1.93 m)
- Listed weight: 260 lb (118 kg)

Career information
- High school: Fitch (OH)
- College: Notre Dame
- NFL draft: 1979: 10th round, 274th overall pick

Career history
- Dallas Cowboys (1979)*; Chicago Bears (1979); Tampa Bay Buccaneers (1980); San Francisco 49ers (1980); Winnipeg Blue Bombers (1981)
- * Offseason or practice squad member only

Awards and highlights
- National champion (1977); Third-team All-American (1978)

Career NFL statistics
- Games played: 7
- Stats at Pro Football Reference

Michael Edward Calhoun (May 6, 1957 – August 23, 1997) was an American professional football defensive tackle in the National Football League (NFL) for the Chicago Bears, San Francisco 49ers and Tampa Bay Buccaneers. He also was a member of the Winnipeg Blue Bombers in the Canadian Football League (CFL). He played college football at the University of Notre Dame.

== Early life ==
Calhoun attended Fitch High School. He accepted a football scholarship from the University of Notre Dame. He was a three-year starter at defensive tackle.

As a junior, he had 2 key fumble recoveries against Clemson University, to allow quarterback Joe Montana to complete a 21–17 come-from-behind victory. He was a part of the 1977 national championship team. His weight dropped from 260 to 206 pounds between his junior and senior years.

As a senior, he was third on the team with 99 tackles (8 for loss). He made 17 tackles in the season opener against the University of Missouri. He had notable performances in his two Cotton Bowl appearances against the University of Texas and the University of Houston.

== Professional career ==
Calhoun was selected by the Dallas Cowboys in the 10th round (274th overall) of the 1979 NFL draft. He was tried at defensive end. He struggled with his lack of size and was waived on August 27.

On December 20, 1979, he was signed as a free agent by the Chicago Bears. He was released on August 26.

On September 15, 1980, he was signed as a free agent by the Tampa Bay Buccaneers. He was released on October 11.

On October 15, 1980, he was signed as a free agent by the San Francisco 49ers. He was released on November 12.

On March 17, 1981, he signed with the Winnipeg Blue Bombers of the Canadian Football League. He was released during the season.
