= Steve Henry (American football) =

American football player (1957–2021)

No. 48, 47, 44
- Position: Defensive back

Personal information
- Born: March 5, 1957; Kansas City, Kansas, U.S.
- Died: March 18, 2021 (aged 64); Emporia, Kansas, U.S.
- Listed height: 6 ft 2 in (1.88 m)
- Listed weight: 190 lb (86 kg)

Career information
- College: Emporia State
- NFL draft: 1979: 5th round, 118th overall pick

Career history
- St. Louis Cardinals (1979); New York Giants (1980); Baltimore Colts (1981)

Career NFL statistics
- Interceptions: 1
- Stats at Pro Football Reference

Steve Arlen Henry (March 5, 1957 – March 18, 2021) was an American professional football defensive back who played in the National Football League (NFL) from 1979 to 1981 for the St. Louis Cardinals, New York Giants and Baltimore Colts. Henry played in a total of 15 career games. He was killed in Emporia, Kansas by a reckless driver, who was fleeing police.
