= Rich Wingo =

American politician and football player (born 1956)

Member of the Alabama House of Representatives from the 62nd district
- In office November 5, 2014 – November 9, 2022
- Preceded by: John Merrill
- Succeeded by: Bill Lamb

Personal details
- Born: Richard Allen Wingo; July 16, 1956 (age 70) Elkhart, Indiana, U.S.
- Party: Republican
- Spouse: Cheri Glasscock
- Children: Jake and Luke Wingo
- Education: University of Alabama
- Football career

No. 50
- Position: Linebacker

Personal information
- Listed height: 6 ft 1 in (1.85 m)
- Listed weight: 230 lb (104 kg)

Career information
- High school: Elkhart (IN)
- College: Alabama
- NFL draft: 1979: 7th round, 184th overall pick

Career history
- Green Bay Packers (1979–1985)

Awards and highlights
- National champion (1978)

Career NFL statistics
- Sacks: 1
- Interceptions: 4
- Games: 69
- Stats at Pro Football Reference

Richard Allen Wingo (born July 16, 1956) is an American Republican politician and a former professional football linebacker in the National Football League (NFL). He played five seasons for the Green Bay Packers from 1979 to 1984. He was selected by the Packers in the seventh round of the 1979 NFL draft out of the University of Alabama.

He was a part of one of the most famous plays in college football history, "The Goal Line Stand" in Alabama's Sugar Bowl victory over Penn State in 1979. He played for college coach Paul "Bear" Bryant. From Pee Wee football through high school, he led every team he played for in tackles.

Wingo is one of four players in Packers history to have a career scoring total of exactly one point. On September 6, 1981, against the Chicago Bears, he caught a pass in the end zone for a successful point-after-touchdown after a botched place-kick attempt. (At the time, either a successful place-kick or advancing the ball into the end zone counted for one point.)

Wingo served as strength coach at Alabama under former head coach Bill Curry.

In 2014 Wingo ran for a seat in the Alabama House of Representatives, winning the general election in November. He was sworn into office in 2015. He served 2 terms, being reelected in 2018.

Alabama House of Representatives
Preceded by John Merrill	Member of the Alabama House of Representatives; 2014–2022	Succeeded by Bill Lamb
