= Danny Sanders =

American gridiron football player (born 1955)

No. 16, 13
- Position: Quarterback

Personal information
- Born: May 14, 1955 (age 71); Oak Ridge, Tennessee, U.S.
- Listed height: 6 ft 4 in (1.93 m)
- Listed weight: 203 lb (92 kg)

Career information
- High school: Oak Ridge
- College: Carson–Newman
- NFL draft: 1979: 11th round, 288th overall pick

Career history
- 1979: New York Jets*
- 1979: Hamilton Tiger-Cats
- 1979–1980: Saskatchewan Roughriders
- 1981: New York Jets*
- * Offseason or practice squad member only

Danny Kay Sanders (born May 14, 1955) is an American former professional football quarterback who played two seasons in the Canadian Football League (CFL) with the Hamilton Tiger-Cats and Saskatchewan Roughriders. He was selected by the New York Jets in the eleventh round of the 1979 NFL draft after playing college football at Carson–Newman University.

== Early life ==
Danny Kay Sanders was born on May 14, 1955, in Oak Ridge, Tennessee. He attended Oak Ridge High School in Oak Ridge.

== College career ==
Sanders played college football for the Carson–Newman Eagles of Carson-Newman College. He was a two-time All-South Atlantic Conference selection and set a school record with 5,360 career passing yards. He also set single-game school records in passing attempts, completions, and passing yards. Sanders was inducted into the Carson-Newman Athletics Hall of Fame in 2009. He was also inducted into the South Atlantic Conference Hall of Fame in 2008.

== Professional career ==
Sanders was selected by the New York Jets in the 11th round, with the 288th overall pick, of the 1979 NFL draft. He was released by the Jets on August 21, 1979.

On August 29, 1979, Sanders started a five-day trial with the Hamilton Tiger-Cats of the Canadian Football League (CFL). He played in one game for the Tiger-Cats but did not record any statistics.

On September 12, 1979, the Saskatchewan Roughriders gave Sanders a five-day trial after claiming him off waivers from Hamilton. After the Roughriders started the 1979 season with an 0–11 record, Sanders took over as the team's starting quarterback. He led the Roughriders to a 2–3 record in the final five games of the season, completing 65 of 133 passes (48.9%) for 1,024 yards, four touchdowns, and seven interceptions while also rushing five times for six yards. Sanders appeared to have secured a spot as the team's starter in 1980, appearing on television, at a hockey game, and at pep rallies. However, the Roughriders later signed veteran John Hufnagel. Sanders took over as starter again after Hufnagel was injured in the first game of the season. Sanders totaled 21 completions on 57 passing attempts (36.8%) for 290 yards, two touchdowns, and seven interceptions that year before being benched for Tom Rozantz and then released by the Roughriders.

Sanders was re-signed by the Jets on February 11, 1981. He was later released on August 17, 1981.

He had a tryout with the CFL's Calgary Stampeders in May 1982 but was not signed.

== Personal life ==
Sanders was a high school teacher and football coach after his playing career, including stints at Carter High School and TMI Academy. He was also an assistant coach for one season at his alma mater, Carson-Newman College. He later opened his own business as a contractor and builder.
