= 1978 Southern Miss Golden Eagles football team =

American college football season

1978 Southern Miss Golden Eagles football
- Conference: Independent
- Record: 7–4
- Head coach: Bobby Collins (4th season)
- Home stadium: M. M. Roberts Stadium

1978 NCAA Division I-A independents football records
| | Conf. | | | | | Overall |
| Team | W | | L | | T | W | | L | | T |
|---|---|---|---|---|---|---|---|---|---|---|
| No. 4 Penn State | | – | | – | | 11 | – | 1 | – | 0 |
| North Texas State | | – | | – | | 9 | – | 2 | – | 0 |
| East Carolina | | – | | – | | 9 | – | 3 | – | 0 |
| Navy | | – | | – | | 9 | – | 3 | – | 0 |
| No. 7 Notre Dame | | – | | – | | 9 | – | 3 | – | 0 |
| Rutgers | | – | | – | | 9 | – | 3 | – | 0 |
| Florida State | | – | | – | | 8 | – | 3 | – | 0 |
| Tennessee State | | – | | – | | 8 | – | 3 | – | 0 |
| Temple | | – | | – | | 7 | – | 3 | – | 1 |
| Pittsburgh | | – | | – | | 8 | – | 4 | – | 0 |
| Holy Cross | | – | | – | | 7 | – | 4 | – | 0 |
| Louisville | | – | | – | | 7 | – | 4 | – | 0 |
| UNLV | | – | | – | | 7 | – | 4 | – | 0 |
| Southern Miss | | – | | – | | 7 | – | 4 | – | 0 |
| Northeast Louisiana | | – | | – | | 6 | – | 4 | – | 1 |
| Georgia Tech | | – | | – | | 7 | – | 5 | – | 0 |
| Hawaii | | – | | – | | 6 | – | 5 | – | 0 |
| Miami (FL) | | – | | – | | 6 | – | 5 | – | 0 |
| South Carolina | | – | | – | | 5 | – | 5 | – | 1 |
| William & Mary | | – | | – | | 5 | – | 5 | – | 1 |
| Cincinnati | | – | | – | | 5 | – | 6 | – | 0 |
| Villanova | | – | | – | | 5 | – | 6 | – | 0 |
| Army | | – | | – | | 4 | – | 6 | – | 1 |
| Memphis State | | – | | – | | 4 | – | 7 | – | 0 |
| Tulane | | – | | – | | 4 | – | 7 | – | 0 |
| Virginia Tech | | – | | – | | 4 | – | 7 | – | 0 |
| Air Force | | – | | – | | 3 | – | 8 | – | 0 |
| Colgate | | – | | – | | 3 | – | 8 | – | 0 |
| Richmond | | – | | – | | 3 | – | 8 | – | 0 |
| Syracuse | | – | | – | | 3 | – | 8 | – | 0 |
| Illinois State | | – | | – | | 2 | – | 9 | – | 0 |
| West Virginia | | – | | – | | 2 | – | 9 | – | 0 |
| Boston College | | – | | – | | 0 | – | 11 | – | 0 |
Rankings from AP Poll

The 1978 Southern Miss Golden Eagles football team was an American football team that represented the University of Southern Mississippi as an independent during the 1978 NCAA Division I-A football season. In their fourth year under head coach Bobby Collins, the team compiled a 7–4 record.

== Schedule ==
| Date | Opponent | Site | Result | Attendance | Source |
|---|---|---|---|---|---|
| September 2 | at Richmond | City Stadium; Richmond, VA | W 10–7 | 15,000 | |
| September 9 | at Arkansas State | War Memorial Stadium; Little Rock, AR | W 21–6 | 16,848 | |
| September 16 | at Cincinnati | Nippert Stadium; Cincinnati, OH | L 14–26 | 10,500 | |
| September 30 | at Ole Miss | Mississippi Veterans Memorial Stadium; Jackson, MS | L 13–16 | 42,756 | |
| October 7 | Mississippi State | M. M. Roberts Stadium; Hattiesburg, MS | W 22–17 | 31,720 | |
| October 14 | East Carolina | M. M. Roberts Stadium; Hattiesburg, MS | W 17–16 | 15,632 | |
| October 21 | at Memphis State | Liberty Bowl Memorial Stadium; Memphis, TN (rivalry) | W 13–10 | 22,630 | |
| October 28 | Florida State^{†} | M. M. Roberts Stadium; Hattiesburg, MS | L 16–38 | 23,248 | |
| November 4 | at North Texas State | Fouts Field; Denton, TX | L 12–25 | 18,400 | |
| November 11 | Bowling Green | M. M. Roberts Stadium; Hattiesburg, MS | W 38–21 | 16,846 | |
| November 18 | Louisville | M. M. Roberts Stadium; Hattiesburg, MS | W 37–3 | 16,219 | |
^{†}Homecoming
