= Mark Stevenson (American football) =

American football player (born 1956)

No. 65
- Positions: Guard, center

Personal information
- Born: February 24, 1956 (age 70); Waukegan, Illinois, U.S.
- Listed height: 6 ft 3 in (1.91 m)
- Listed weight: 285 lb (129 kg)

Career information
- High school: Rock Island (Rock Island, Illinois)
- College: Western Illinois
- NFL draft: 1979: undrafted

Career history
- Seattle Seahawks (1979)*; Chicago Bears (1982)*; Chicago Blitz (1983); San Diego Chargers (1985)*; Detroit Lions (1985)
- * Offseason or practice squad member only

Career NFL statistics
- Games played: 2
- Stats at Pro Football Reference

Mark Oliver Stevenson (born February 24, 1956) is an American former professional football player who was a guard for the Detroit Lions of the National Football League (NFL). He played college football for the Western Illinois Leathernecks.
