= Bill Murrell =

American football player (born 1956)

No. 80
- Position: Tight end

Personal information
- Born: June 14, 1956 (age 70); Walnut Cove, North Carolina, U.S.
- Listed height: 6 ft 3 in (1.91 m)
- Listed weight: 220 lb (100 kg)

Career information
- High school: South Stokes (Walnut Cove)
- College: Winston-Salem State
- NFL draft: 1979: 6th round, 157th overall pick

Career history
- St. Louis Cardinals (1979)

Career NFL statistics
- Receptions: 2
- Receiving yards: 20
- Stats at Pro Football Reference

William Ellis Murrell (born June 14, 1956) is an American former professional football player who was a tight end for the St. Louis Cardinals of the National Football League (NFL). He played college football for the Winston-Salem State Rams.
