= 1979 Los Angeles Rams season =

NFL team season

- Owner: Georgia Rosenbloom
- General manager: Don Klosterman
- Head coach: Ray Malavasi
- Home stadium: Los Angeles Memorial Coliseum

Results
- Record: 9–7
- Division place: 1st NFC West
- Playoffs: Won Divisional Playoffs (at Cowboys) 21–19; Won NFC Championship (at Buccaneers) 9–0; Lost Super Bowl XIV (vs. Steelers) 19–31

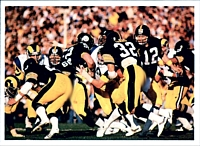
The Rams ended the 1979 season by making it to Super Bowl XIV, where they lost to the Steelers 31-19

The 1979 season was the Los Angeles Rams' 42nd season in the National Football League (NFL), their 43rd overall, and their 34th in the Greater Los Angeles Area. It was the final season for the franchise in the Los Angeles Memorial Coliseum until 2016, as late owner Carroll Rosenbloom previously announced the Rams would move to Anaheim Stadium for the 1980 season.

The Rams won their seventh-consecutive NFC West title in 1979 and went to the Super Bowl for the first time. It was the team's only Super Bowl appearance during their first stint in Los Angeles, and their first appearance in a league championship game since 1955. It would be the Rams' last division title for six seasons and the last time they would win consecutive division titles until 2017–18. The Rams wouldn't return to the Super Bowl based in Los Angeles until 2018 (their next one as a franchise was in 1999 while based in St. Louis). Their streak of 7 straight division titles stood as an NFL record for 38 years until the New England Patriots won their 8th straight AFC East championship in 2016, a streak that eventually reached 11 straight in 2019. The Kansas City Chiefs have since moved into 2nd place for the most consecutive division titles, having won 9 straight AFC West division titles from 2016 to 2024.

The 1979 Rams were the first team in NFL history to have a less than a +50 point differential and make it to the Super Bowl. (The Rams scored only 14 points more than their opponents in 1979.) Thirty-two years later, the 2011 New York Giants, also with a 9–7 record, became the first team to reach the Super Bowl with a negative point differential (−6); unlike the 1979 Rams, the Giants would go on to win the Super Bowl, defeating the New England Patriots in Super Bowl XLVI. The 2008 Arizona Cardinals also reached the Super Bowl, but lost in the final moments of Super Bowl XLIII, also to the Pittsburgh Steelers. Because of this, the 1979 Rams are often cited as one of the worst Super Bowl teams of all time.

== Offseason ==
Owner Caroll Rosenbloom drowned on April 2, 1979, while swimming in the Atlantic Ocean just off of his home in Golden Beach, Florida, leaving the team to his widow, Georgia.

=== Draft ===
1979 Los Angeles Rams draft
Round	Pick	Player	Position	College	Notes
1	19	George Andrews	Linebacker	Nebraska	
1	26	Kent Hill *	Guard	Georgia Tech	
2	54	Eddie Hill	Running back	Memphis State	
3	58	Jeff Moore	Wide receiver	Tennessee	Made roster in 1980
3	81	Mike Wellman	Center	Kansas	
4	99	Derwin Tucker	Cornerback	Illinois	
4	108	Jerry Wilkinson	Defensive end	Oregon State	
5	122	Victor Hicks	Tight end	Oklahoma	Made roster in 1980
7	190	Jeff Delaney	Safety	Pittsburgh	Made roster in 1980
9	246	Jeff Rutledge	Quarterback	Alabama	
10	273	Grady Ebensbeger	Defensive tackle	Houston	
11	301	Jesse Deramus	Defensive tackle	Tennessee State	
12	328	Drew Hill *	Wide receiver	Georgia Tech	
Made roster † Pro Football Hall of Fame * Made at least one Pro Bowl during career

=== Undrafted free agents ===
1979 undrafted free agents of note
Player	Position	College
Ken Beckman	Punter	Arizona State
Dan Bierstedt	Linebacker	Southwest Texas State
Dan Burns	Tight end	USC
Dennis Byrd	Wide receiver	Long Beach State
Ralph Carnahan	Running back	Tennessee State
Phil Chambliss	Defensive end	San Diego State
Jeff Corbitt	Running back	
Mike Evans	Tackle	UNLV
Richard Force	Linebacker	Cal Poly
Jim Freitas	Quarterback	Long Beach State
Armando Herrera	Kicker	Cal Poly
James Johnson	Defensive end	Virginia Tech
Frank Jordan	Kicker	USC
Sid Justin	Cornerback	Long Beach State
Bob Keiper	Tight end	St. Marys
Dan Kendra	Quarterback	West Virginia
Craig Kimball	Quarterback	San Jose State
Floyd Lavender	Cornerback	Cal State Fullerton
Tony Maddocks	Wide receiver	Long Beach State
Keith Myers	Safety	Utah State
John Paetz	Guard	Fresno State
Curtis Philyaw	Safety	West L. A. College
Ivory Sully	Safety	Delaware
Jimmy Tucker	Running back	UNLV
Burks Washington	Linebacker	North Texas State

== Personnel ==
=== Staff / Coaches ===
1979 Los Angeles Rams staff
Front office: Owner/President – Georgia Frontiere; Executive Vice President/General Manager – Don Klosterman; Vice President of Special Projects - James D. Dooley; Director of Player Personnel – John Math; Head coaches: Head Coach – Ray Malavasi; Offensive coaches: Offensive Coordinator / Wide Receivers – Lionel Taylor; Quarterbacks – Paul Lanham; Offensive Backfield / Special Assistant – Jack Faulkner; Offensive Line – Dan Radakovich	Defensive coaches: Defensive Coordinator – Bud Carson; Defensive Line – LaVern Torgeson; Linebackers – Frank Lauterbur; Special teams coaches: Special Teams – Paul Lanham; Strength and conditioning: Conditioning – Clyde Evans

=== Final roster ===
1979 Los Angeles Rams roster
Quarterbacks (QB): 15 Vince Ferragamo; 19 Bob Lee; 8 Jeff Rutledge; Running backs (RB): 32 Cullen Bryant; 24 Eddie Hill; 43 Jim Jodat; 30 Lawrence McCutcheon; 26 Wendell Tyler; Wide receivers (WR): 88 Preston Dennard; 87 Drew Hill; 84 Ron Smith; 80 Billy Waddy; Tight ends (TE): 83 Terry Nelson; 86 Charle Young	Offensive linemen (OL): 62 Bill Bain G; 77 Doug France T; 73 Gordon Gravelle T; 60 Dennis Harrah G; 72 Kent Hill G; 54 Dan Ryczek G/C; 61 Rich Saul C; 78 Jackie Slater T; Defensive linemen (DL): 90 Larry Brooks DT; 71 Reggie Doss DE; 89 Fred Dryer DE; 79 Mike Fanning DT; 70 Jerry Wilkinson DE; 85 Jack Youngblood DE	Linebackers (LB): 52 George Andrews OLB; 59 Bob Brudzinski OLB; 51 Joe Harris MLB; 64 Jack Reynolds MLB; 57 Greg Westbrooks OLB; 53 Jim Youngblood OLB; Defensive backs (DB): 25 Eddie Brown FS; 21 Nolan Cromwell FS/CB; 28 Ken Ellis CB; 42 Dave Elmendorf SS; 33 Dwayne O'Steen CB; 49 Rod Perry CB; 37 Ivory Sully CB/S; 27 Pat Thomas CB; 20 Jackie Wallace SS; Special teams (ST): 13 Ken Clark P; 3 Frank Corral K	Reserve: 22 John Cappelletti RB (IR); 41 Jeff Delaney S (IR); 66 Bill Dunstan DT (IR); 55 Carl Ekern LB (IR); 11 Pat Haden QB (IR); 92 Victor Hicks TE (IR); 81 Ron Jessie WR (IR); 76 Cody Jones DT (IR); 29 Sid Justin CB (IR); 82 Willie Miller WR (IR); 46 Jeff Moore WR (IR); 34 Elvis Peacock RB (IR); 48 Bill Simpson S (Ret.); 56 Doug Smith G (IR); 63 Leon White G (IR); 75 John Williams T (IR); Rookies in italics

== Preseason ==
=== Schedule ===
Week	Date	Opponent	Result	Record	Venue	Attendance	NFL.com recap
1	August 4	Oakland Raiders	W 20–17 (OT)	1–0	Los Angeles Memorial Coliseum	54,575	
2	August 12	at New England Patriots	W 15–3	2–0	Schaefer Stadium	44,955	
3	August 18	Seattle Seahawks	W 21–17	3–0	Los Angeles Memorial Coliseum	46,083	
4	August 25	San Diego Chargers	W 23–7	4–0	Los Angeles Memorial Coliseum	50,089	

== Regular season ==
=== Schedule ===
Week	Date	Opponent	Result	Record	Venue	Attendance	Recap
1	September 2	Oakland Raiders	**L** 17–24	0–1	Los Angeles Memorial Coliseum	59,000	Recap
2	September 6	at Denver Broncos	**W** 13–9	1–1	Mile High Stadium	74,884	Recap
3	September 16	**San Francisco 49ers**	**W** 27–24	2–1	Los Angeles Memorial Coliseum	44,303	Recap
4	September 23	at Tampa Bay Buccaneers	**L** 6–21	2–2	Tampa Stadium	69,497	Recap
5	September 30	St. Louis Cardinals	**W** 21–0	3–2	Los Angeles Memorial Coliseum	48,160	Recap
6	October 7	at **New Orleans Saints**	**W** 35–17	4–2	Louisiana Superdome	68,986	Recap
7	October 14	at Dallas Cowboys	**L** 6–30	4–3	Texas Stadium	64,462	Recap
8	October 21	San Diego Chargers	**L** 16–40	4–4	Los Angeles Memorial Coliseum	64,245	Recap
9	October 28	New York Giants	**L** 14–20	4–5	Los Angeles Memorial Coliseum	43,376	Recap
10	November 4	at Seattle Seahawks	**W** 24–0	5–5	Kingdome	62,048	Recap
11	November 11	at Chicago Bears	**L** 23–27	5–6	Soldier Field	51,483	Recap
12	November 19	**Atlanta Falcons**	**W** 20–14	6–6	Los Angeles Memorial Coliseum	54,097	Recap
13	November 25	at **San Francisco 49ers**	**W** 26–20	7–6	Candlestick Park	49,282	Recap
14	December 2	Minnesota Vikings	**W** 27–21 (OT)	8–6	Los Angeles Memorial Coliseum	56,700	Recap
15	December 9	at **Atlanta Falcons**	**W** 34–13	9–6	Atlanta–Fulton County Stadium	49,236	Recap
16	December 16	**New Orleans Saints**	**L** 14–29	9–7	Los Angeles Memorial Coliseum	53,879	Recap
Note: Intra-division opponents are in **bold** text.

Notes:

^{a} All times are PDT/PST (UTC–7 and UTC–8 starting October 28)

=== Season summary ===
==== Week 1 ====
Team	1	2	3	4	Total
• Raiders	0	10	14	0	24
Rams	7	10	0	0	17

- Date: September 2
- Location: Los Angeles Memorial Coliseum
- Referee: Cal Lepore

The Rams jumped out to an early 14–0 lead, but a failure to protect the punter led to two blocks and 10 Raiders points before halftime. The Raiders also intercepted three second-half passes and turned two into Ken Stabler-to-Raymond Chester touchdown passes.

==== Week 2 ====
Team	1	2	3	4	Total
• Rams	6	0	0	7	13
Broncos	2	0	0	7	9

- Date: September 6
- Location: Mile High Stadium
- Referee: Gordon McCarter

Rams tackle John Williams held Bronco LB Larry Evans in the end zone in the first quarter for a safety. The Rams appeared on verge of going 0–2 until, late in the fourth, safety Dave Elmendorf laid a hit on QB Craig Morton and LB Jack Reynolds picked up the fumble and reached the end zone for the winning score.

==== Week 3 ====
Team	1	2	3	4	Total
49ers	10	0	0	14	24
• Rams	0	14	7	6	27

- Date: September 16
- Location: Los Angeles Memorial Coliseum
- Referee: Red Cashion
- TV announcers (CBS): Vin Scully and George Allen

After spotting the 49ers 10 points, the Rams scored 24 unanswered, Pat Haden passing for two touchdowns and Cullen Bryant rushing for 106 yards and another to secure the win.

==== Week 4 ====
Team	1	2	3	4	Total
Rams	6	0	0	0	6
• Buccaneers	0	21	0	0	21

- Date: September 23
- Location: Tampa Stadium
- Referee: Jerry Markbreit
- TV announcers (CBS): Vin Scully and George Allen

Jim Youngblood put the Rams on the board early with an interception return touchdown, but from then on it was all Buccaneers as Doug Williams tossed two touchdowns in the second quarter and the Tampa Bay defense shut down the Rams.

==== Week 5 ====
Team	1	2	3	4	Total
Cardinals	0	0	0	0	0
• Rams	7	7	0	7	21

- Date: September 30
- Location: Los Angeles Memorial Coliseum
- Referee: Jerry Seeman

The Rams bounced back with a shutout. Speedy Wendell Tyler started at running back and scored a touchdown.

==== Week 6 ====
Team	1	2	3	4	Total
• Rams	0	28	0	7	35
Saints	7	0	3	7	17

- Date: October 7
- Location: Louisiana Superdome
- Game weather: Indoors (dome)
- Referee: Bob Frederic

Haden threw for three touchdowns in the blowout, but WR Ron Jessie was injured and lost for the remainder of the season along with fellow WR Willie Miller.

==== Week 7 ====
Team	1	2	3	4	Total
Rams	0	6	0	0	6
• Cowboys	6	7	17	0	30

- Date: October 14
- Location: Texas Stadium
- Referee: Fred Wyant
- TV announcers (ABC): Frank Gifford, Don Meredith, and Fran Tarkenton

In a dominating performance by the Cowboys, Roger Staubach passed for three touchdowns and Tony Dorsett ran for 103 and a touchdown.

==== Week 8 ====
Team	1	2	3	4	Total
• Chargers	7	7	17	9	40
Rams	7	0	0	9	16

- Date: October 21
- Location: Los Angeles Memorial Coliseum
- Referee: Gordon McCarter
- TV announcers (NBC): Dick Enberg and Merlin Olsen

The Chargers forced eight turnovers, including four interceptions and four fumble recoveries (one for a touchdown), with five sacks and numerous hits on Haden. Dan Fouts passed for 326 yards and two touchdowns.

==== Week 9 ====
Team	1	2	3	4	Total
• Giants	3	7	3	7	20
Rams	0	0	7	7	14

- Date: October 28
- Location: Los Angeles Memorial Coliseum
- Referee: Fred Silva
- TV announcers (CBS): Vin Scully, George Allen

Haden passed for 282 yards and two touchdowns but also threw four more interceptions and had trouble making big plays. Giants rookie QB Phil Simms found success running and passing.

==== Week 10 ====
Team	1	2	3	4	Total
• Rams	14	7	3	0	24
Seahawks	0	0	0	0	0

- Date: November 4
- Location: Kingdome
- Game weather: Indoors (dome)
- Referee: Pat Haggerty
- TV announcers (CBS): Vin Scully and George Allen

The Rams defense turned in a record-setting performance, holding the Seahawks to minus-7 yards of total offense and one first down. Haden threw two touchdowns on 21-of-24 passing and set a team record with 13 straight completions, but fractured his right pinky finger and would be lost for the rest of the season.

==== Week 11 ====
Team	1	2	3	4	Total
Rams	9	7	7	0	23
• Bears	0	7	7	13	27

- Date: November 11
- Location: Soldier Field
- Referee: Dick Jorgensen
- TV announcers (CBS): Vin Scully and George Allen

With both Haden and backup Vince Ferragamo out, the Rams turned to quarterback Jeff Rutledge, who threw for a touchdown and helped the Rams to a 23–14 lead after three quarters, but the defense faltered.

==== Week 12 ====
Team	1	2	3	4	Total
Falcons	0	0	7	7	14
• Rams	7	7	0	6	20

- Date: November 19
- Location: Los Angeles Memorial Coliseum
- Referee: Jerry Markbreit
- Television network: ABC

Ferragamo made his first start of the season in this Monday night game and showed his big-play capability, completing long touchdown passes to young speedsters Preston Dennard and Billy Waddy.

==== Week 13 ====
Team	1	2	3	4	Total
• Rams	3	10	13	0	26
49ers	7	10	0	3	20

- Date: November 25
- Location: Candlestick Park
- Referee: Cal Lepore
- TV announcers (CBS): Lindsey Nelson and Paul Hornung

An unexpectedly tough game against the 1–11 49ers featured many significant plays, including an 80-yard blocked field-goal return touchdown by Rams CB Sid Justin and a 71-yard touchdown pass from Ferragamo to Tyler.

==== Week 14 ====
Team	1	2	3	4	OT	Total
Vikings	7	7	0	7	0	21
• Rams	7	7	7	0	6	27

- Date: December 2
- Location: Los Angeles Memorial Coliseum
- Referee: Ben Dreith
- TV announcers (CBS): Curt Gowdy and Hank Stram

After the Rams gained only 44 yards in the first half, Malavasi benched Ferragamo in favor of backup Bob Lee after halftime. In overtime, the Rams ran a fake field goal and holder Nolan Cromwell scored on a five-yard touchdown run to lift the Rams into first place in the NFC West. The Rams took sole possession of the division lead the next night when the Saints lost.

==== Week 15 ====
Team	1	2	3	4	Total
• Rams	0	28	3	3	34
Falcons	0	6	0	7	13

- Date: December 9
- Location: Atlanta–Fulton County Stadium
- Referee: Bob Frederic
- TV announcers (CBS): Vin Scully and George Allen

Scoring 28 points in the second quarter and forcing five Falcons turnovers, the Rams clinched their seventh straight NFC West division title, an NFL record. Tyler gained 150 yards from scrimmage in the win.

==== Week 16 ====
Team	1	2	3	4	Total
• Saints	0	14	6	9	29
Rams	7	0	0	7	14

- Date: December 16
- Location: Los Angeles Memorial Coliseum
- Referee: Pat Haggerty
- TV announcers (CBS): Vin Scully, George Allen

Having clinched the division the previous week, the Rams played a sloppy game, committing six turnovers and allowing 422 yards to the Saints. Tyler rushed for 141 yards and a first-quarter touchdown, but New Orleans scored the next 27 points. This was the Rams' final home game at the Los Angeles Coliseum before their relocation to Anaheim Stadium.

=== Standings ===
NFC West
	W	L	T	PCT	DIV	CONF	PF	PA	STK
Los Angeles Rams^{(3)}	9	7	0	.563	5–1	7–5	323	309	L1
New Orleans Saints	8	8	0	.500	4–2	8–4	370	360	W1
Atlanta Falcons	6	10	0	.375	2–4	5–7	300	388	W1
San Francisco 49ers	2	14	0	.125	1–5	2–10	308	416	L1

== Playoffs ==
Round	Date	Opponent	Kickoff	TV	Result	Record	Game Site	Attendance	Recap
Wild Card	First Round Bye								
Divisional	December 30	at Dallas Cowboys (1)	1:00 p.m. PST	CBS	W 21–19	1–0	Texas Stadium	64,792	Recap
NFC Championship	January 6	at Tampa Bay Buccaneers (2)	2:00 p.m. PST	CBS	W 9–0	2–0	Tampa Stadium	72,033	Recap
Super Bowl XIV	January 20	vs. Pittsburgh Steelers (A2)	3:00 p.m. PST	CBS	L 19–31	2–1	Rose Bowl	103,985	Recap

Notes:

^{a} All times are PACIFIC time.

=== NFC Divisional Playoffs (Sunday, December 30, 1979): at (1) Dallas Cowboys ===
NFC Divisional Playoffs: Los Angeles Rams at Dallas Cowboys

Quarter	1	2	3	4	Total
Rams	0	14	0	7	21
Cowboys	2	3	7	7	19

at Texas Stadium • Irving, Texas

- Date: December 30, 1979
- Game time: 1:00 p.m. PST
- Game weather: 43 degrees, relative humidity 71%, wind 12 mph
- Game attendance: 64,792
- Referee: Jerry Markbreit
- TV announcers (CBS): Vin Scully (play-by-play) and George Allen (color commentator)
- Pro-Football-Reference.com

Game information

Vegas Odds

- Vegas Line=LA +8.5 (Won)

Rams
Cowboys
Game Length

- Time of Game:

Scoring summary

Quarter	Time	Drive			Team	Scoring information	Score	
Quarter	Time	Plays	Yards	TOP	Team	Scoring information	LA	DAL
1		—	—	—	Cowboys	−2-yard loss, Ferragamo tackled in end zone by White for a safety	0	2
2					Rams	Tyler 32-yard touchdown reception from Ferragamo, Corral kick good	7	2
2					Cowboys	33-yard field goal by Septién	7	5
2					Rams	Smith 43-yard touchdown reception from Ferragamo, Corral kick good	14	5
4					Cowboys	Springs 1-yard touchdown run, Septién kick good	14	12
4					Cowboys	Saldy 2-yard touchdown reception from Staubach, Septién kick good	14	19
4					Rams	Waddy 50-yard touchdown reception from Ferragamo, Corral kick good	21	19
"TOP" = time of possession. For other American football terms, see Glossary of American football.							21	19

Quarterback Vince Ferragamo led the Rams to a victory by throwing for 3 touchdown passes, the last one with 2:06 left in the game. The Cowboys scored first when defensive tackle Randy White sacked Ferragamo in the end zone for a safety. However, Ferragamo responded by throwing a 32-yard touchdown pass to running back Wendell Tyler. Dallas kicker Rafael Septién kicked a 33-yard field goal with 52 seconds left in the first half, but Ferragamo completed a 43-yard touchdown pass to Ron Smith before time expired to make it a 14–5 halftime lead. The Cowboys, led by quarterback Roger Staubach in what proved to be his last NFL game of his Hall of Fame career, then scored 2 unanswered touchdowns in the second half to take the lead, 19–14. With about 2 minutes left in the game and the Rams at midfield, Ferragamo found wide receiver Billy Waddy on a short crossing route and Waddy sprinted the rest of the way for a game winning 50-yard touchdown. Staubach was unable to engineer a late fourth quarter comeback like the ones that made him famous throughout his career. The Rams defense pressured the Dallas quarterback to throw a pass illegally to an ineligible receiver, guard Herbert Scott, on third down, the last pass of his career to be caught; on fourth down, he overthrew Drew Pearson.

=== Conference Championship ===
Team	1	2	3	4	Total
• Rams	0	6	0	3	9
Buccaneers	0	0	0	0	0

- Date: January 6
- Location: Tampa Stadium
- Referee: Pat Haggerty

In a defensive battle in which the Rams squandered numerous scoring opportunities, Rams kicker Frank Corral kicked 3 field goals to win the game. Los Angeles was able to record 369 yards of total offense, while running backs Cullen Bryant and Wendell Tyler rushed for 106 and 86 yards, respectively. Meanwhile, the Buccaneers only had 177 total offensive yards, including 92 rushing yards and 85 passing yards. Most of Tampa Bay's passing yards came from a 42-yard halfback option pass from Jerry Eckwood to wide receiver Larry Mucker in the fourth quarter. During the game, two touchdowns were nullified by penalties, one by each team: A four-yard run by Bryant and a 27-yard reception by Buccaneers' tight end Jimmie Giles.

=== Super Bowl ===
Team	1	2	3	4	Total
Rams	7	6	6	0	19
• Steelers	3	7	7	14	31

- Date: January 20
- Location: Rose Bowl
- Game attendance: 103,985
- Referee: Fred Silva
- TV announcers (CBS): Pat Summerall, and Tom Brookshier

Though listed as a 10.5-point underdog, the NFC champion Rams were the designated visitors against the defending Super Bowl champion Steelers. After giving up an early field goal, Los Angeles took its first lead when Wendell Tyler's 39-yard run to the Pittsburgh 14 led to a 1-yard touchdown run by fullback Cullen Bryant for a 7–3 advantage. The Steelers responded with a Franco Harris touchdown run from a yard out. Two field goals by kicker Frank Corral put the Rams on top 13–10 at halftime. Pittsburgh went back on top early in the third quarter with wide receiver Lynn Swann catching a 47-yard TD pass from quarterback Terry Bradshaw. But the Rams responded quickly, driving down to the Pittsburgh 24. Taking a pitchout, running back Lawrence McCutcheon pulled up and threw a touchdown pass to wide receiver Ron Smith for a 19–17 lead, but Corral missed his PAT attempt. L.A.'s defense kept the Rams in the game, holding the Steelers to just 84 rushing yards while the secondary picked off Bradshaw three times. But the Steelers QB rallied back and his 73-yard touchdown pass to wide receiver John Stallworth gave Pittsburgh the lead for good early in the fourth quarter. The Rams' last chance for victory came late in the fourth quarter. Quarterback Vince Ferragamo, who threw for 212 yards in the game, led L.A. to the Pittsburgh 32 but linebacker Jack Lambert intercepted Ferragamo's pass intended for Smith. The Steelers then finished the scoring as Harris scored his second 1-yard TD of the game for the game's final margin. The Rams were the first team to play in the Super Bowl in their home market.
