= 1978 Georgia Bulldogs football team =

American college football season

1978 Georgia Bulldogs football

Astro-Bluebonnet Bowl, L 22–25 vs. Stanford
- Conference: Southeastern Conference

Ranking
- Coaches: No. 15
- AP: No. 16
- Record: 9–2–1 (5–0–1 SEC)
- Head coach: Vince Dooley (15th season)
- Defensive coordinator: Erk Russell (15th season)
- Base defense: 4–4
- Home stadium: Sanford Stadium

1978 Southeastern Conference football standings
	Conf.					Overall
Team	W		L		T	W		L		T
No. 1 Alabama $	6	–	0	–	0	11	–	1	–	0
No. 16 Georgia	5	–	0	–	1	9	–	2	–	1
Auburn	3	–	2	–	1	6	–	4	–	1
LSU	3	–	3	–	0	8	–	4	–	0
Tennessee	3	–	3	–	0	5	–	5	–	1
Florida	3	–	3	–	0	4	–	7	–	0
Mississippi State	2	–	4	–	0	6	–	5	–	0
Ole Miss	2	–	4	–	0	5	–	6	–	0
Kentucky	2	–	4	–	0	4	–	6	–	1
Vanderbilt	0	–	6	–	0	2	–	9	–	0
$ – Conference champion; Rankings from AP Poll

The 1978 Georgia Bulldogs football team represented the University of Georgia as a member of the Southeastern Conference (SEC) during the 1978 NCAA Division I-A football season. Led by 15th-year head coach Vince Dooley, the Bulldogs compiled an overall record of 9–2–1, with a mark of 5–0–1 in conference play, and finished second in the SEC.

== Schedule ==
Date	Opponent	Rank	Site	TV	Result	Attendance	Source
September 16	Baylor*		Sanford Stadium; Athens, GA	ABC	W 16–14	43,000	
September 23	Clemson*		Sanford Stadium; Athens, GA (rivalry)		W 12–0	60,000	
September 30	at South Carolina*	No. 19	Williams–Brice Stadium; Columbia, SC (rivalry)		L 10–27	56,514	
October 7	Ole Miss		Sanford Stadium; Athens, GA		W 42–3	58,800	
October 14	at No. 11 LSU		Tiger Stadium; Baton Rouge, LA		W 24–17	77,158	
October 21	Vanderbilt^{†}	No. 18	Sanford Stadium; Athens, GA (rivalry)		W 31–10	53,800	
October 28	at Kentucky	No. 16	Commonwealth Stadium; Lexington, KY		W 17–16	56,918	
November 4	VMI*	No. 13	Sanford Stadium; Athens, GA		W 41–3	50,200	
November 11	vs. Florida	No. 11	Gator Bowl Stadium; Jacksonville, FL (rivalry)		W 24–22	68,232	
November 18	at Auburn	No. 8	Jordan-Hare Stadium; Auburn, AL (rivalry)		T 22–22	64,761	
December 2	Georgia Tech*	No. 11	Sanford Stadium; Athens, GA (rivalry)	ABC	W 29–28	59,700	
December 31	vs. Stanford*	No. 11	Houston Astrodome; Houston, TX (Astro-Bluebonnet Bowl)	Mizlou	L 22–25	34,084	
*Non-conference game; ^{†}Homecoming; Rankings from AP Poll released prior to the game

== Roster ==
1978 Georgia Bulldogs football team roster
Players
Coaches
Offense

Pos.	#	Name	Class
RB		Amp Arnold
QB		Buck Belue	Fr
OL		Matt Braswell
OL		Ray Donaldson
OL		Mack Guest
TE		Mark Hodge
OL		Nate Hudson
RB		Steve Kelly
RB	36	Willie McClendon	Sr
RB		Donnie McMickens
OL		Jim Milo
TE		Ulysses Norris
WR		Carmon Prince
QB		Jeff Pyburn
WR		Jay Russell
QB		Davy Sawyer
WR	24	Lindsay Scott	Fr
RB		Matt Simon
RB		Ronnie Stewart
WR		Gene Veal
RB		Jimmy Womack

Defense

Pos.	#	Name	Class
DB		Pat Collins
LB		Steve Dennis
DL		Louis Freedman
DL		Robert Goodwin
DB		Robert Hope
DB		Bob Kelly
LB		Ricky McBride
DL		Paul Petrisko
LB		Danny Rodgers
DL		Gordon Terry
DB		Scott Woerner

Special teams

Pos.	#	Name	Class
K		Rex Robinson	So
P	6	Mike Garrett	Jr

Head coach

- Vince Dooley

Coordinators/assistant coaches

- Erk Russell (DC)

Legend

- (C) Team captain
- (S) Suspended
- (I) Ineligible
- Injured
- Redshirt
