= 1978 Miami Hurricanes football team =

American college football season

1978 Miami Hurricanes football
- Conference: Independent
- Record: 6–5
- Head coach: Lou Saban (2nd season)
- Offensive scheme: T formation
- Defensive coordinator: Rick Lantz (2nd season)
- Base defense: 4–3
- MVP: Ottis Anderson
- Home stadium: Miami Orange Bowl

1978 NCAA Division I-A independents football records
	Conf.					Overall
Team	W		L		T	W		L		T
No. 4 Penn State		–		–		11	–	1	–	0
North Texas State		–		–		9	–	2	–	0
East Carolina		–		–		9	–	3	–	0
Navy		–		–		9	–	3	–	0
No. 7 Notre Dame		–		–		9	–	3	–	0
Rutgers		–		–		9	–	3	–	0
Florida State		–		–		8	–	3	–	0
Tennessee State		–		–		8	–	3	–	0
Temple		–		–		7	–	3	–	1
Pittsburgh		–		–		8	–	4	–	0
Holy Cross		–		–		7	–	4	–	0
Louisville		–		–		7	–	4	–	0
UNLV		–		–		7	–	4	–	0
Southern Miss		–		–		7	–	4	–	0
Northeast Louisiana		–		–		6	–	4	–	1
Georgia Tech		–		–		7	–	5	–	0
Hawaii		–		–		6	–	5	–	0
Miami (FL)		–		–		6	–	5	–	0
South Carolina		–		–		5	–	5	–	1
William & Mary		–		–		5	–	5	–	1
Cincinnati		–		–		5	–	6	–	0
Villanova		–		–		5	–	6	–	0
Army		–		–		4	–	6	–	1
Memphis State		–		–		4	–	7	–	0
Tulane		–		–		4	–	7	–	0
Virginia Tech		–		–		4	–	7	–	0
Air Force		–		–		3	–	8	–	0
Colgate		–		–		3	–	8	–	0
Richmond		–		–		3	–	8	–	0
Syracuse		–		–		3	–	8	–	0
Illinois State		–		–		2	–	9	–	0
West Virginia		–		–		2	–	9	–	0
Boston College		–		–		0	–	11	–	0
Rankings from AP Poll

The 1978 Miami Hurricanes football team represented the University of Miami as an independent during the 1978 NCAA Division I-A football season. Led by Lou Saban in his second and final year as head coach, the Hurricanes played their home games at the Miami Orange Bowl in Miami, Florida. Miami finished the season with a record of 6–5.

== Schedule ==
Date	Opponent	Site	TV	Result	Attendance	Source
September 16	at Colorado	Folsom Field; Boulder, CO		L 7–17	44,714	
September 23	No. 13 Florida State	Miami Orange Bowl; Miami, FL (rivalry)	ABC	L 21–31	25,003	
September 30	at Kansas	Memorial Stadium; Lawrence, KS		W 38–6	36,372–47,420	
October 7	at No. 19 Auburn	Jordan-Hare Stadium; Auburn, AL		W 17–15	55,136	
October 14	at Georgia Tech	Grant Field; Atlanta, GA		L 19–24	29,695	
October 21	Utah State	Miami Orange Bowl; Miami, FL		W 17–16	25,702	
October 28	at No. 19 Notre Dame	Notre Dame Stadium; Notre Dame, IN (rivalry)		L 0–20	59,075	
November 4	at Tulane	Louisiana Superdome; New Orleans, LA		L 16–20	20,045	
November 18	San Diego State	Miami Orange Bowl; Miami, FL		W 16–14	17,468	
November 25	Syracuse	Miami Orange Bowl; Miami, FL		W 21–9	15,739	
December 2	at Florida	Florida Field; Gainesville, FL (rivalry)		W 22–21	47,815	
Rankings from AP Poll released prior to the game

== Personnel ==
1978 Miami Hurricanes football team roster
Players
Coaches
Offense

Pos.	#	Name	Class
FB, RB	47	Ottis Anderson	Sr
WR	17	E.J. Baker	Sr
OT, G	58	Clem Barbarino	Fr
WR	43	Larry Brodsky	Fr
TE, P	85	Mark Cooper	Fr
RB, FB	40	Chris Hobbs	So
WR	13	James Joiner	So
QB	7	Jim Kelly	Fr
QB	15	Kenny McMillian	So
QB	18	Mark Richt	Fr
FB	49	Mark Rush	Fr

Defense

Pos.	#	Name	Class
ILB	57	Mozell Axson	So
MG	83	Jim Burt	So
DB	31	Fred Marion	Fr
ILB	66	Scott Nicolas	Fr
DB	37	Rick Valerio	Sr

Special teams

Pos.	#	Name	Class
K	1	Danny Miller	Fr

Head coach

- Lou Saban

Coordinators/assistant coaches

- Len Fontes – Defensive backs
- Ron Marciniak – Offensive line

Legend

- (C) Team captain
- (S) Suspended
- (I) Ineligible
- Injured
- Redshirt

== Game summaries ==
=== Florida State ===
#13 Florida State Seminoles (2–0) at Miami (FL) Hurricanes (0–1)

Quarter	1	2	3	4	Total
Florida St	0	14	7	10	31
Miami (FL)	7	7	0	7	21

at Orange Bowl, Miami, Florida

- Date: September 23, 1978
- Game weather: Cloudy, 83 °F (28 °C)
- Game attendance: 25,003
- Box Score

Team	Category	Player	Statistics
Florida St	Passing	Jimmy Jordan	8/12, 83 Yds, TD, INT
Florida St	Rushing	Homes Johnson	23 Rush, 90 Yds
Florida St	Receiving	Mark Lyles	5 Rec, 58 Yds, TD
Miami (FL)	Passing	Mark Richt	5/11, 74 Yds, TD, 3 INT
Miami (FL)	Rushing	Ottis Anderson	15 Rush, 137 Yds, TD
Miami (FL)	Receiving	Mark Cooper	3 Rec, 48 Yds

Scoring summary

Quarter	Time	Drive			Team	Scoring information	Score	
Quarter	Time	Plays	Yards	TOP	Team	Scoring information	FSU	UM
1	9:27	1	80	0:15	Miami (FL)	Ottis Anderson 80-yard touchdown run, Danny Miller kick good	0	7
2	12:57				Florida St	Blocked punt returned 48 yards for touchdown by Mark Macek, Dave Cappelen kick good	7	7
2	9:25	2	52	0:19	Miami (FL)	James Joiner 48-yard touchdown run, Danny Miller kick good	7	14
2	2:49	13	76	6:36	Florida St	Jackie Flowers 4-yard touchdown reception from Jimmy Jordan, Dave Cappelen kick good	14	14
3	8:15	7	41	3:44	Florida St	Wally Woodham 1-yard touchdown run, Dave Cappelen kick good	21	14
4	6:58	4	-3	0:52	Florida St	26-yard field goal by Dave Cappelen	24	14
4	4:27	5	65	2:31	Miami (FL)	E.J. Baker 27-yard touchdown reception from Mark Richt, Danny Miller kick good	24	21
4	1:14	4	31	0:42	Florida St	Mark Lyles 22-yard touchdown reception from Wally Woodham, Dave Cappelen kick good	31	21
"TOP" = time of possession. For other American football terms, see Glossary of American football.							31	21
