= 1978 Alabama Crimson Tide football team =

American college football season

1978 Alabama Crimson Tide football

AP Poll national champion FWAA national champion NFF national champion SEC champion Sugar Bowl champion

Sugar Bowl, W 14–7 vs. Penn State
- Conference: Southeastern Conference

Ranking
- Coaches: No. 2
- AP: No. 1
- Record: 11–1 (6–0 SEC)
- Head coach: Bear Bryant (21st season)
- Offensive coordinator: Mal Moore (4th season)
- Offensive scheme: Wishbone
- Defensive coordinator: Ken Donahue (5th season)
- Base defense: 5–2
- Captains: Marty Lyons; Jeff Rutledge; Tony Nathan
- Home stadium: Bryant–Denny Stadium; Legion Field

1978 Southeastern Conference football standings
	Conf.					Overall
Team	W		L		T	W		L		T
No. 1 Alabama $	6	–	0	–	0	11	–	1	–	0
No. 16 Georgia	5	–	0	–	1	9	–	2	–	1
Auburn	3	–	2	–	1	6	–	4	–	1
LSU	3	–	3	–	0	8	–	4	–	0
Tennessee	3	–	3	–	0	5	–	5	–	1
Florida	3	–	3	–	0	4	–	7	–	0
Mississippi State	2	–	4	–	0	6	–	5	–	0
Ole Miss	2	–	4	–	0	5	–	6	–	0
Kentucky	2	–	4	–	0	4	–	6	–	1
Vanderbilt	0	–	6	–	0	2	–	9	–	0
$ – Conference champion; Rankings from AP Poll

The 1978 Alabama Crimson Tide football team (variously "Alabama", "UA" or "Bama") represented the University of Alabama in the 1978 NCAA Division I-A football season. It was the Crimson Tide's 84th overall and 45th season as a member of the Southeastern Conference (SEC). The team was led by head coach Bear Bryant, in his 21st year, and played their home games at Bryant–Denny Stadium in Tuscaloosa and Legion Field in Birmingham, Alabama. They finished season with eleven wins and one loss (11–1 overall, 6–0 in the SEC), as SEC champions and as national champions after a 14–7 victory over Penn State in the Sugar Bowl.

Alabama's costumed "Big Al" mascot officially debuted this season, appearing at the Sugar Bowl.

== Schedule ==
Date	Opponent	Rank	Site	TV	Result	Attendance	Source
September 2	No. 10 Nebraska*	No. 1	Legion Field; Birmingham, AL	ABC	W 20–3	77,023	
September 16	at No. 11 Missouri*	No. 1	Memorial Stadium; Columbia, MO		W 38–20	73,655	
September 23	No. 7 USC*	No. 1	Legion Field; Birmingham, AL	ABC	L 14–24	77,313	
September 30	Vanderbilt	No. 7	Bryant–Denny Stadium; Tuscaloosa, AL		W 51-28	56,910	
October 7	at Washington*	No. 8	Husky Stadium; Seattle, WA		W 20–17	60,975	
October 14	Florida	No. 7	Bryant–Denny Stadium; Tuscaloosa, AL (rivalry)		W 23–12	60,210	
October 21	at Tennessee	No. 4	Neyland Stadium; Knoxville, TN (Third Saturday in October)		W 30–17	85,436	
October 28	Virginia Tech*^{†}	No. 3	Bryant–Denny Stadium; Tuscaloosa, AL		W 35–0	60,210	
November 4	Mississippi State	No. 3	Legion Field; Birmingham, AL (rivalry)		W 35–14	74,217	
November 11	No. 10 LSU	No. 3	Legion Field; Birmingham, AL (rivalry)	ABC	W 31–10	76,831	
December 2	vs. Auburn	No. 2	Legion Field; Birmingham, AL (Iron Bowl)		W 34–16	79,218	
January 1, 1979	vs. No. 1 Penn State*	No. 2	Louisiana Superdome; New Orleans, LA (Sugar Bowl, rivalry)	ABC	W 14–7	76,824	
*Non-conference game; ^{†}Homecoming; Rankings from AP Poll released prior to the game; Source:

== Before the season ==
Alabama ended the 1977 season with the disappointment of a #2 finish, an 11-point voting margin behind national champion Notre Dame.

On April 13, 1978, Paul Bryant was one of several coaches quoted in an AP interview that focused on efforts to rid college football of cheating. Bryant advocated a rule requiring coaches notify the NCAA of suspected infractions immediately and getting it over with rather than complaining after losing a game.

On April 20, nearly a dozen players with injuries were held out of the annual A-Day game that ended in a colorless 7–7 tie. The biggest concern was a knee injury to second-string QB Steadman Shealy. Bryant, in the post A-Day game press conference, declared his 1978 team would have "a questionable offense, an average kicking game, and a good defense" in the post-A-Day game press conference. Lastly a newcomer who was recruited four years ago but decided to pursue other athletics adventures started as outside linebacker from Richmond Virginia, Eddie McGeorge.

Bear Bryant felt his team was not prepared enough for their week-1 game against Nebraska and did not feel his team deserved their #1 rating.

== Sugar Bowl ==
The 1979 Sugar Bowl against Penn State would go down as a classic. Alabama scored in the second quarter, then Penn State answered in the third, then Alabama took a 14–7 lead on a touchdown set up by a 62-yard punt return. Penn State had a chance to tie in the fourth, but quarterback Chuck Fusina threw an interception into the Alabama end zone. Then Alabama had a chance to put the game away, but fumbled the football back to Penn State at the Nittany Lion 19-yard-line with four minutes to go. Penn State drove to a first and goal at the Alabama eight. On third and goal from the one, Fusina asked Bama defensive lineman Marty Lyons "What do you think we should do?", and Lyons answered "You'd better pass." On third down, Penn State was stopped inches short of the goal line. On fourth down, Penn State was stopped again, Barry Krauss meeting Mike Guman and throwing him back for no gain. Alabama held on for a 14–7 victory. The Crimson Tide split the national championship, winning the AP poll while Southern California won the UPI Coaches' poll, this despite the Trojans' 24–14 victory over the Crimson Tide on September 23. It was Alabama's fifth wire service national championship.

== Personnel ==
1978 Alabama Crimson Tide football team roster
Players
Coaches
Offense

Pos.	#	Name	Class
OT	78	Buddy Aydelette	Jr
WR		Bruce Bolton	Sr
OL		Vince Boothe	Jr
OL		Mike Brock	Jr
OL		Jim Bunch	Jr
WR		Tim Clark
RB		James Haney	Fr
RB		John Hill	So
RB		Lou Ikner	Sr
RB		Billy Jackson	So
RB		Joe Jones	So
QB		Kevin Jones	Sr
WR		Alan Krout
RB	22	Tony Nathan	Sr
WR		Rick Neal	Sr
RB	42	Major Ogilvie	So
WR	4	Keith Pugh	Jr
QB	11	Jeff Rutledge	Sr
OT	69	Bill Searcey	So
QB	10	Steadman Shealy	Jr
C	57	Dwight Stephenson	Jr
TE	88	Tim Travis	Jr
RB		John Turpin	Sr
FB	45	Steve Whitman	Jr

Defense

Pos.	#	Name	Class
DB		Henry Adams	So
DB		Phil Allman	Sr
LB		Charles Andre	So
DT		Thomas Boler	Jr
DL		Byron Braggs	So
DB		Allen Crumbley	Sr
DL	51	Gary DeNiro	So
DL	94	Wayne Hamilton	Jr
DB		Jim Bob Harris
DT	95	Mike Inman	So
DE	39	E. J. Junior	So
LB		Barry Krauss	Sr
DB		Murray Legg	Sr
DL		Warren Lyles	Fr
DL		Marty Lyons	Sr
LB		Eddie McGeorge
DT	96	Curtis McGriff	Jr
DB	28	Don McNeal	Jr
LB	50	Randy Scott	So
DB		Bobby Smith	Jr
DB		Ricky Tucker	So
LB	36	Rich Wingo	Sr

Special teams

Pos.	#	Name	Class
P		Don Jacobs	So
P		Woody Umphrey	So

Head coach

- Bear Bryant

Coordinators/assistant coaches

Legend

- (C) Team captain
- (S) Suspended
- (I) Ineligible
- Injured
- Redshirt

Roster
