= 1978 Mississippi State Bulldogs football team =

American college football season

1978 Mississippi State Bulldogs football
- Conference: Southeastern Conference
- Record: 6–5 (2–4 SEC)
- Head coach: Bob Tyler (6th season)
- Offensive coordinator: Jimmy Sharpe (1st season)
- Home stadium: Scott Field; Mississippi Veterans Memorial Stadium

1978 Southeastern Conference football standings
	Conf.					Overall
Team	W		L		T	W		L		T
No. 1 Alabama $	6	–	0	–	0	11	–	1	–	0
No. 16 Georgia	5	–	0	–	1	9	–	2	–	1
Auburn	3	–	2	–	1	6	–	4	–	1
LSU	3	–	3	–	0	8	–	4	–	0
Tennessee	3	–	3	–	0	5	–	5	–	1
Florida	3	–	3	–	0	4	–	7	–	0
Mississippi State	2	–	4	–	0	6	–	5	–	0
Ole Miss	2	–	4	–	0	5	–	6	–	0
Kentucky	2	–	4	–	0	4	–	6	–	1
Vanderbilt	0	–	6	–	0	2	–	9	–	0
$ – Conference champion; Rankings from AP Poll

The 1978 Mississippi State Bulldogs football team represented Mississippi State University during the 1978 NCAA Division I-A football season. The Bulldogs were not invited to a bowl game despite being eligible. After the season, head coach Bob Tyler resigned.

== Schedule ==
Date	Opponent	Site	Result	Attendance	Source
September 2	West Texas State*	Mississippi Veterans Memorial Stadium; Jackson, MS	W 28–0	30,000	
September 9	at North Texas State*	Texas Stadium; Irving, TX	W 17–5	21,000	
September 23	at Memphis State*	Liberty Bowl Memorial Stadium; Memphis, TN	W 44–14	49,238	
September 30	at Florida	Florida Field; Gainesville, FL	L 0–34	48,597	
October 7	at Southern Miss*	M. M. Roberts Stadium; Hattiesburg, MS	L 17–22	31,720	
October 14	No. 15 Florida State*	Scott Field; Starkville, MS	W 55–27	36,000	
October 28	vs. Tennessee	Liberty Bowl Memorial Stadium; Memphis, TN	W 34–21	40,879	
November 4	at No. 3 Alabama	Legion Field; Birmingham, AL (rivalry)	L 14–35	74,217	
November 11	Auburn	Scott Field; Starkville, MS	L 0–6	34,100	
November 18	No. 17 LSU	Mississippi Veterans Memorial Stadium; Jackson, MS (rivalry)	W 16–14	44,200	
November 25	vs. Ole Miss	Mississippi Veterans Memorial Stadium; Jackson, MS (Egg Bowl)	L 7–27	47,012	
*Non-conference game; Rankings from AP Poll released prior to the game
