= Joe Bell (baseball) =

Baseball pitcher in the Negro leagues

- Pitcher / Outfielder
- Batted: Unknown Threw: Left

Negro league baseball debut
- 1932, for the Montgomery Grey Sox

Last appearance
- 1932, for the Montgomery Grey Sox

Teams
- Montgomery Grey Sox (1932)

Joseph "Lefty" Bell was an American baseball pitcher and outfielder in the Negro leagues. He played with the Montgomery Grey Sox in 1932.

While 1932 was Bell's first year in professional baseball, he was expected to be one of the league's best pitchers by the end of the season. However, he only appeared in two recorded games as a pitcher, going 1–0 with a 3.14 earned run average in 14.1 innings pitched. He also played the outfield, recording four hits in 14 at bats.
