= Clinton Burrell =

American football player (born 1956)

No. 49
- Position: Defensive back

Personal information
- Born: September 4, 1956 (age 70); Franklin, Louisiana, U.S.
- Listed height: 6 ft 1 in (1.85 m)
- Listed weight: 192 lb (87 kg)

Career information
- College: LSU
- NFL draft: 1979: 6th round, 151st overall pick

Career history
- Cleveland Browns (1979–1984)

Awards and highlights
- First-team All-SEC (1976)

Career NFL statistics
- Sacks: 2
- Interceptions: 8
- Fumble recoveries: 6
- Stats at Pro Football Reference

Clinton Blane Burrell (/bʌrˈɛl/ burr-EL; born September 4, 1956) is an American former professional football player who was a defensive back in the National Football League (NFL). He played six seasons for the Cleveland Browns. Burrell played college football for the LSU Tigers prior to being selected by the Browns in the sixth round of the 1979 NFL draft. He attended Franklin Senior High School in Franklin, Louisiana.
