= Jerry Wilkinson =

American football player (born 1956)

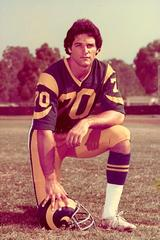
- Jerry Wilkinson in 1979

No. 70, 60
- Position: Defensive end

Personal information
- Born: February 27, 1956 (age 70); San Francisco, California, U.S.
- Listed height: 6 ft 9 in (2.06 m)
- Listed weight: 260 lb (118 kg)

Career information
- High school: San Mateo (CA)
- College: Oregon State
- NFL draft: 1979: 4th round, 108th overall pick

Career history
- Los Angeles Rams (1979); Cleveland Browns (1980); San Francisco 49ers (1980); San Francisco 49ers (1981)*; Los Angeles Raiders (1982)*; Oakland Invaders (1983); San Antonio Gunslingers (1984)*
- * Offseason or practice squad member only

Awards and highlights
- Second-team All-Pac-10 (1978)

Career NFL statistics
- Sacks: 1.5
- Stats at Pro Football Reference

Jerry Wilkinson (born February 27, 1956) is an American former professional football player who was a defensive end in the National Football League (NFL). He played college football for the Oregon State Beavers. Wilkinson played in the NFL for the Los Angeles Rams in 1979 and for the Cleveland Browns and San Francisco 49ers in 1980.
