= 1978 Auburn Tigers football team =

American college football season

1978 Auburn Tigers football
- Conference: Southeastern Conference
- Record: 6–4–1 (3–2–1 SEC)
- Head coach: Doug Barfield (3rd season)
- Offensive coordinator: Dal Shealy (2nd season)
- Defensive coordinator: P. W. Underwood (3rd season)
- Home stadium: Jordan-Hare Stadium; Legion Field

1978 Southeastern Conference football standings
	Conf.					Overall
Team	W		L		T	W		L		T
No. 1 Alabama $	6	–	0	–	0	11	–	1	–	0
No. 16 Georgia	5	–	0	–	1	9	–	2	–	1
Auburn	3	–	2	–	1	6	–	4	–	1
LSU	3	–	3	–	0	8	–	4	–	0
Tennessee	3	–	3	–	0	5	–	5	–	1
Florida	3	–	3	–	0	4	–	7	–	0
Mississippi State	2	–	4	–	0	6	–	5	–	0
Ole Miss	2	–	4	–	0	5	–	6	–	0
Kentucky	2	–	4	–	0	4	–	6	–	1
Vanderbilt	0	–	6	–	0	2	–	9	–	0
$ – Conference champion; Rankings from AP Poll

The 1978 Auburn Tigers football team achieved an overall 6–4–1 record under third-year head coach Doug Barfield and failed to receive an invitation to a bowl game. While only slightly better than the previous year's 6–5 record, the 1978 squad fared worse in the Southeastern Conference (SEC) completing the season with a record of 3–2–1.

Four players were named All-SEC players for 1978: defensive back James McKinney, running back Joe Cribbs, offensive tackle Mike Burrow, and defensive tackle Frank Warren.

== Schedule ==
Date	Opponent	Rank	Site	Result	Attendance	Source
September 16	at Kansas State*		KSU Stadium; Manhattan, KS	W 45–32	27,620	
September 23	at Virginia Tech*		Lane Stadium; Blacksburg, VA	W 18–7	38,000	
September 30	Tennessee		Legion Field; Birmingham, AL (rivalry)	W 29–10	50,136	
October 7	Miami (FL)*	No. 19	Jordan-Hare Stadium; Auburn, AL	L 15–17	55,136	
October 14	at Vanderbilt		Dudley Field; Nashville, TN	W 49–7	30,394	
October 21	Georgia Tech*		Jordan-Hare Stadium; Auburn, AL (rivalry)	L 10–24	59,111	
October 28	Wake Forest*^{†}		Jordan-Hare Stadium; Auburn, AL	W 21–7	52,120	
November 4	at Florida		Florida Field; Gainesville, FL (rivalry)	L 7–31	59,343	
November 11	at Mississippi State		Scott Field; Starkville, MS	W 6–0	34,100	
November 18	No. 8 Georgia		Jordan-Hare Stadium; Auburn, AL (rivalry)	T 22–22	64,761	
December 2	vs. No. 2 Alabama		Legion Field; Birmingham, AL (Iron Bowl)	L 16–34	79,218	
*Non-conference game; ^{†}Homecoming; Rankings from AP Poll released prior to the game
