= Curtis Weathers =

American football player (born 1956)

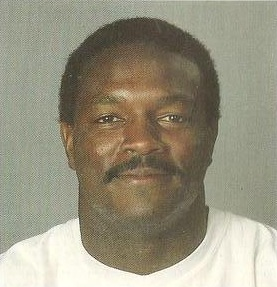

No. 87, 55
- Position: Linebacker

Personal information
- Born: September 16, 1956 (age 70); Memphis, Tennessee, U.S.
- Listed height: 6 ft 5 in (1.96 m)
- Listed weight: 224 lb (102 kg)

Career information
- High school: Bishop Byrne (Memphis)
- College: Mississippi
- NFL draft: 1979: 9th round, 241st overall pick

Career history
- Cleveland Browns (1979–1985)

Awards and highlights
- Second-team All-SEC (1977)

Career NFL statistics
- Sacks: 4
- Interceptions: 1
- Receptions: 1
- Stats at Pro Football Reference

Curtis Lenard Weathers (born September 16, 1956) is an American former professional football player who was a linebacker in the National Football League (NFL). He was selected by the Cleveland Browns in the ninth round of the 1979 NFL draft. He played college football for the Ole Miss Rebels.
