= Fred Pancoast =

American football coach (1932–2023)

Biographical details
- Born: c. 1932; Pensacola, Florida, U.S.
- Died: April 8, 2023 (aged 90)

Playing career
- 1950s: Tampa

Coaching career (HC unless noted)
- 1959–1961: Tampa (assistant)
- 1962–1963: Tampa
- 1964–1968: Florida (assistant)
- 1969: Florida (OC/QB)
- 1970–1971: Georgia (OC)
- 1972–1974: Memphis State
- 1975–1978: Vanderbilt

Head coaching record
- Overall: 41–51–4
- Bowls: 0–2–1

Fred Pancoast (c. 1932 – April 9, 2023) was an American human resources executive and a college football player and coach. He served as the head football coach at the University of Tampa (1962–1963), Memphis State University, now the University of Memphis, (1972–1974), and Vanderbilt University (1975–1978), compiling a career college football record of 41–51–4.

Pancoast was born in Pensacola, Florida, and graduated from Pensacola High School in 1949. He played football at the University of Tampa and was inducted into the school's Athletic Hall of Fame in 1967. After graduating from college, he served in the United States Marine Corps and later became an educator. Pancoast also coached at Hillsborough High School in Tampa, Florida.

From 1962 to 1963, Pancoast served as the head football coach at Tampa. From 1964 to 1968, he was the offensive backfield coach at the University of Florida and in 1969 was promoted to the offensive coordinator position and helped the offense set numerous school records. He also served as the school's quarterback coach, where he coached Heisman Trophy winner, Steve Spurrier. From 1970 to 1971, he was the offensive coordinator at University of Georgia.

From 1972 to 1974, Pancoast guided Memphis to a 20–12–1 record. He didn't enjoy the same success at Vanderbilt, where he coached from 1975 to 1978. He compiled a 13–31 record there. In his final three seasons, he posted three straight 2–9 records.

After coaching football, Pancoast went into human resources. In 1980, he took a job with Murray Manufacturing Company as director of human resources. In 1985, Pancoast founded Pancoast Benefits, an employee benefits marketing and consulting firm.

Pancoast was awarded the Lifetime Achievement Award from the Tennessee Sports Hall of Fame in 2007. In 2008 he was given the President's Volunteer Service Award by President George W. Bush. In 2011, he received the Fred Russell Distinguished American Award from the Middle Tennessee Chapter of the National Football Foundation and College Hall of Fame.

Pancost died on April 9, 2023, at the age of 90.

== Head coaching record ==
Year	Team	Overall	Conference	Standing	Bowl/playoffs
Tampa Spartans (NCAA College Division independent) (1962–1963)
1962	Tampa	3–4–2			
1963	Tampa	5–4–1			
Tampa:		8–8–3			
Memphis State Tigers (Missouri Valley Conference) (1972)
1972	Memphis State	5–5–1	3–2	5th	
Memphis State Tigers (NCAA Division I independent) (1973–1974)
1973	Memphis State	8–3			
1974	Memphis State	7–4			
Memphis State:		20–12–1	3–2		
Vanderbilt Commodores (Southeastern Conference) (1975–1978)
1975	Vanderbilt	7–4	2–4	6th	
1976	Vanderbilt	2–9	0–6	10th	
1977	Vanderbilt	2–9	0–6	10th	
1978	Vanderbilt	2–9	0–6	10th	
Vanderbilt:		13–31	2–22		
Total:		41–51–4			
