= Joe Bell (American football) =

American football player (born 1956)

No. 68, 78
- Position: Defensive end

Personal information
- Born: September 15, 1957 (age 69)
- Listed height: 6 ft 3 in (1.91 m)
- Listed weight: 250 lb (113 kg)

Career information
- High school: Lindblom Technical
- College: Norfolk State
- NFL draft: 1979: undrafted

Career history
- Oakland Raiders (1979); Winnipeg Blue Bombers (1980)
- Stats at Pro Football Reference

Joseph Bell (born September 15, 1957) is an American former professional football player who was a defensive end for the Oakland Raiders of the National Football League (NFL) in 1979. He also played for the Winnipeg Blue Bombers of the Canadian Football League (CFL) in 1980. He played college football for the Norfolk State Spartans.

Bell earned both athletic and academic honors at Norfolk State University. In academic, he was chosen 1979 CIAA Conference Scholar Athlete of the Year. He graduated with a 3.5 GPA in Electrical Engineering. As an athlete, Joe Bell demonstrated excellence by being named to both the 1978 CIAA All-Conference Sportswriters and Coaches Football Teams and AP All-American Team (honorable mention).

Bell played his final college game as a member of the Black College All-Star Bowl played in the New Orleans Super Dome on January 7, 1979.
