= Willie McClendon =

American football player (born 1957)

No. 37
- Position: Running back

Personal information
- Born: September 13, 1957 (age 69); Brunswick, Georgia, U.S.
- Listed height: 6 ft 1 in (1.85 m)
- Listed weight: 205 lb (93 kg)

Career information
- High school: Glynn Academy (Brunswick)
- College: Georgia (1975–1978)
- NFL draft: 1979: 3rd round, 66th overall pick

Career history
- Chicago Bears (1979–1982); Jacksonville Bulls (1984)

Awards and highlights
- Second-team All-American (1978); SEC Player of the Year (1978); First-team All-SEC (1978); Florida–Georgia Hall of Fame

Career NFL statistics
- Rushing attempts: 94
- Rushing yards: 369
- Touchdowns: 2
- Stats at Pro Football Reference

Willie Edward McClendon (born September 13, 1957) is an American former professional football player who was a running back in the National Football League (NFL). Selected 66th overall in the third round of the 1979 NFL draft, he played for the Chicago Bears from 1979 to 1982. He is the father of former Bears wide receiver and current wide receivers coach for the Tampa Bay Buccaneers, Bryan McClendon. Both father and son attended the University of Georgia.

McClendon was elected to the Georgia Sports Hall of Fame and was inducted in February 2015.
