= 1978 Florida Gators football team =

American college football season

1978 Florida Gators football
- Conference: Southeastern Conference
- Record: 4–7 (3–3 SEC)
- Head coach: Doug Dickey (9th season)
- Offensive scheme: Pro-style
- Defensive coordinator: Doug Knotts (9th season)
- Captains: Mike DuPree; Don Swafford
- Home stadium: Florida Field

1978 Southeastern Conference football standings
	Conf.					Overall
Team	W		L		T	W		L		T
No. 1 Alabama $	6	–	0	–	0	11	–	1	–	0
No. 16 Georgia	5	–	0	–	1	9	–	2	–	1
Auburn	3	–	2	–	1	6	–	4	–	1
LSU	3	–	3	–	0	8	–	4	–	0
Tennessee	3	–	3	–	0	5	–	5	–	1
Florida	3	–	3	–	0	4	–	7	–	0
Mississippi State	2	–	4	–	0	6	–	5	–	0
Ole Miss	2	–	4	–	0	5	–	6	–	0
Kentucky	2	–	4	–	0	4	–	6	–	1
Vanderbilt	0	–	6	–	0	2	–	9	–	0
$ – Conference champion; Rankings from AP Poll

The 1978 Florida Gators football team represented the University of Florida during the 1978 NCAA Division I-A football season. The season was Doug Dickey's ninth and last year as the head coach of the Florida Gators football team. The 1978 Florida Gators finished with a 4–7 overall record and a 3–3 Southeastern Conference (SEC) record, tying for fourth among ten SEC teams. After a disappointing 1977 season, Dickey had been under pressure to shake up his coaching staff, and he decided to abandon the run-oriented wishbone offense his teams had used for several seasons in favor of a more pro-style system. Former Florida quarterback Steve Spurrier, who had lived in Gainesville since wrapping up his NFL career in 1976, was tapped by Dickey to be the Gators' quarterback coach, his first coaching job.

However, without the proper talent to run the new scheme, Florida's 1978 scoring output was almost identical to 1977's output – about 22 points per game. Florida struggled with consistency, never winning consecutive games, losing to traditional rivals Georgia and Florida State, and enduring their first losing season since 1971. Days before the final game, Dickey (along with Spurrier and the rest of the coaching staff) were told by University of Florida president Robert Q. Marston that they would be let go after the season. Days after the season finale, Florida announced that Clemson coach Charley Pell had been hired to coach the Gators.

== Schedule ==
Date	Opponent	Site	TV	Result	Attendance	Source
September 16	vs. SMU*	Orlando Stadium; Orlando, FL		L 25–35	34,101	
September 30	Mississippi State	Florida Field; Gainesville, FL		W 34–0	48,597	
October 7	No. 11 LSU	Florida Field; Gainesville, FL (rivalry)		L 21–34	55,457	
October 14	at No. 7 Alabama	Bryant–Denny Stadium; Tuscaloosa, AL (rivalry)		L 12–23	60,210	
October 21	Army*^{†}	Florida Field; Gainesville, FL		W 31–7	57,625	
October 28	at Georgia Tech*	Grant Field; Atlanta, GA	ABC	L 13–17	44,866	
November 4	Auburn	Florida Field; Gainesville, FL (rivalry)		W 31–7	59,343	
November 11	vs. No. 11 Georgia	Gator Bowl Stadium; Jacksonville, FL (rivalry)		L 22–24	68,232	
November 18	at Kentucky	Commonwealth Stadium; Lexington, KY (rivalry)		W 18–16	56,500	
November 25	at Florida State*	Doak Campbell Stadium; Tallahassee, FL (rivalry)		L 21–38	48,432	
December 2	Miami (FL)*	Florida Field; Gainesville, FL (rivalry)		L 21–22	47,815	
*Non-conference game; ^{†}Homecoming; Rankings from AP Poll released prior to the game

== Postseason ==
After leaving Florida, Dickey went into private business for several years before becoming the athletic director of the University of Tennessee's Volunteers sports program in 1985. He was inducted into the College Football Hall of Fame as a coach in 2003. After a dozen years spent as an offensive assistant and head coach in college football and the USFL, Spurrier would return to become Florida's head coach in 1990.
