= 1978 Vanderbilt Commodores football team =

American college football season

1978 Vanderbilt Commodores football
- Conference: Southeastern Conference
- Record: 2–9 (0–6 SEC)
- Head coach: Fred Pancoast (4th season)
- Home stadium: Dudley Field

1978 Southeastern Conference football standings
	Conf.					Overall
Team	W		L		T	W		L		T
No. 1 Alabama $	6	–	0	–	0	11	–	1	–	0
No. 16 Georgia	5	–	0	–	1	9	–	2	–	1
Auburn	3	–	2	–	1	6	–	4	–	1
LSU	3	–	3	–	0	8	–	4	–	0
Tennessee	3	–	3	–	0	5	–	5	–	1
Florida	3	–	3	–	0	4	–	7	–	0
Mississippi State	2	–	4	–	0	6	–	5	–	0
Ole Miss	2	–	4	–	0	5	–	6	–	0
Kentucky	2	–	4	–	0	4	–	6	–	1
Vanderbilt	0	–	6	–	0	2	–	9	–	0
$ – Conference champion; Rankings from AP Poll

The 1978 Vanderbilt Commodores football team represented Vanderbilt University as a member of the Southeastern Conference (SEC) during the 1978 NCAA Division I-A football season. Led by Fred Pancoast in his fourth and final season as head coach, the Commodores compiled an overall record of 2–9 with a mark of 0–6 in conference play, placing last out of ten teams in the SEC. Vanderbilt played home games at Dudley Field in Nashville, Tennessee.

== Schedule ==
Date	Opponent	Site	Result	Attendance	Source
September 16	at No. 2 Arkansas*	War Memorial Stadium; Little Rock, AR	L 17–48	55,718	
September 23	Furman*	Dudley Field; Nashville, TN	W 17–10	25,000	
September 30	at No. 7 Alabama	Bryant–Denny Stadium; Tuscaloosa, AL	L 28–51	56,910	
October 7	Tulane*	Dudley Field; Nashville, TN	L 3–38	27,600	
October 14	Auburn	Dudley Field; Nashville, TN	L 7–49	30,394	
October 21	at No. 18 Georgia	Sanford Stadium; Athens, GA (rivalry)	L 10–31	53,800	
October 28	Ole Miss	Dudley Field; Nashville, TN (rivalry)	L 10–35	25,043	
November 4	at Memphis State*	Liberty Bowl Memorial Stadium; Memphis, TN	L 14–35	22,443	
November 11	at Kentucky	Commonwealth Stadium; Lexington, KY (rivalry)	L 2–53	57,800	
November 18	Air Force*	Dudley Field; Nashville, TN	W 41–27	18,500	
December 2	Tennessee	Dudley Field; Nashville, TN (rivalry)	L 15–41	35,263	
*Non-conference game; Rankings from AP Poll released prior to the game
