= Jeff Moore (wide receiver) =

American football player (born 1957)

No. 86
- Position: Wide receiver

Personal information
- Born: March 2, 1957 (age 69); Memphis, Tennessee, U.S.
- Listed height: 6 ft 1 in (1.85 m)
- Listed weight: 194 lb (88 kg)

Career information
- High school: Fairley (Memphis)
- College: Tennessee
- NFL draft: 1979: 3rd round, 58th overall pick

Career history
- Los Angeles Rams (1979–1981); San Diego Chargers (1983)*
- * Offseason or practice squad member only
- Stats at Pro Football Reference

Jeffrey Bernard Moore (born March 2, 1957) is an American former professional football wide receiver who played for the Los Angeles Rams of the National Football League (NFL). He played college football for the Tennessee Volunteers and was selected by the Rams in the third round of the 1979 NFL draft.

== Early life ==
Jeffrey Bernard Moore was born on March 2, 1957, in Memphis, Tennessee. He attended Fairley High School in Memphis. He originally committed to Memphis State University to play college football but switched to the University of Tennessee after head coach Fred Pancoast left Memphis State.

== College career ==
Moore was a four-year letterman for the Volunteers from 1975 to 1978. He was a wingback his freshman year in 1975 and played in all 12 games while catching one pass for 22 yards and rushing three times for 23 yards. He was moved to defensive back in 1976, appearing in all 11 contests while recording two interceptions for 22 yards. He converted to wide receiver in 1977. He finished his college career with totals of 46 receptions for 799 yards and four touchdowns, 12 punt returns for 32 yards, one kick return for 19 yards, and six carries for 42 yards.

== Professional career ==
Moore was selected by the Los Angeles Rams in the third round, with the 58th overall pick, of the 1979 NFL draft. On August 14, 1979, he was placed on injured reserve with a hamstring injury and missed the entire 1979 season. He played in 14 games for the Rams in a reserve role during the 1980 season, catching ten passes for 168 yards and one touchdown on 19 targets. Moore also appeared in one playoff game but did not record any statistics. He played in ten games in 1981, recording seven receptions for 105 yards on 17 targets. He was released on September 6, 1982, before the start of the 1982 regular season.

Moore signed with the San Diego Chargers on April 29, 1983. He was released on August 29, 1983, after the final preseason game.
