= 1978 Kentucky Wildcats football team =

American college football season

1978 Kentucky Wildcats football
- Conference: Southeastern Conference
- Record: 4–6–1 (2–4 SEC)
- Head coach: Fran Curci (6th season)
- Offensive coordinator: Perry Moss (2nd season)
- Defensive coordinator: Charlie Bailey (4th season)
- Home stadium: Commonwealth Stadium

1978 Southeastern Conference football standings
	Conf.					Overall
Team	W		L		T	W		L		T
No. 1 Alabama $	6	–	0	–	0	11	–	1	–	0
No. 16 Georgia	5	–	0	–	1	9	–	2	–	1
Auburn	3	–	2	–	1	6	–	4	–	1
LSU	3	–	3	–	0	8	–	4	–	0
Tennessee	3	–	3	–	0	5	–	5	–	1
Florida	3	–	3	–	0	4	–	7	–	0
Mississippi State	2	–	4	–	0	6	–	5	–	0
Ole Miss	2	–	4	–	0	5	–	6	–	0
Kentucky	2	–	4	–	0	4	–	6	–	1
Vanderbilt	0	–	6	–	0	2	–	9	–	0
$ – Conference champion; Rankings from AP Poll

The 1978 Kentucky Wildcats football team represented the University of Kentucky in the Southeastern Conference (SEC) during the 1978 NCAA Division I-A football season. In their sixth season under head coach Fran Curci, the Wildcats compiled a 4–6–1 record (2–4 against SEC opponents), finished in a tie for seventh place in the SEC, and outscored their opponents, 193 to 189. The team played its home games in Commonwealth Stadium in Lexington, Kentucky.

The team's statistical leaders included Larry McCrimmon with 752 passing yards, Fred Williams with 313 rushing yards, and Felix Wilson with 727 receiving yards. Kentucky began the year ranked 17th, but fell out of the polls after week one.

== Schedule ==
Date	Opponent	Site	Result	Attendance	Source
September 16	at South Carolina*	Williams–Brice Stadium; Columbia, SC	T 14–14	56,385	
September 23	Baylor*	Commonwealth Stadium; Lexington, KY	W 25–21	57,793	
September 30	at No. 15 Maryland*	Byrd Stadium; College Park, MD	L 3–20	42,873	
October 7	No. 5 Penn State*	Commonwealth Stadium; Lexington, KY	L 0–30	58,068	
October 14	at Ole Miss	Hemingway Stadium; Oxford, MS	W 24–17	38,290	
October 21	No. 16 LSU	Commonwealth Stadium; Lexington, KY	L 0–21	57,918	
October 28	No. 16 Georgia	Commonwealth Stadium; Lexington, KY	L 16–17	56,918	
November 4	at Virginia Tech*	Lane Stadium; Blacksburg, VA	W 28–0	36,000	
November 11	Vanderbilt	Commonwealth Stadium; Lexington, KY (rivalry)	W 53–2	57,800	
November 18	Florida	Commonwealth Stadium; Lexington, KY (rivalry)	L 16–18	56,500	
November 25	at Tennessee	Neyland Stadium; Knoxville, TN (rivalry)	L 14–29	84,926	
*Non-conference game; Rankings from Coaches' Poll released prior to the game

== Roster ==
1978 Kentucky Wildcats football team roster
Players
Coaches
Offense

Pos.	#	Name	Class
[[American football positions|]]
[[American football positions|]]

Defense

Pos.	#	Name	Class
[[American football positions|]]

Special teams

Pos.	#	Name	Class

Head coach

- Fran Curci

Coordinators/assistant coaches

Legend

- (C) Team captain
- (S) Suspended
- (I) Ineligible
- Injured
- Redshirt
