= 1978 Ole Miss Rebels football team =

American college football season

1978 Ole Miss Rebels football
- Conference: Southeastern Conference
- Record: 5–6 (2–4 SEC)
- Head coach: Steve Sloan (1st season)
- Offensive coordinator: John Cropp (1st season)
- Defensive coordinator: George MacIntyre (1st season)
- Captains: Bobby Garner; Lawrence Johnson; Curtis Weathers
- Home stadium: Hemingway Stadium; Mississippi Veterans Memorial Stadium

1978 Southeastern Conference football standings
	Conf.					Overall
Team	W		L		T	W		L		T
No. 1 Alabama $	6	–	0	–	0	11	–	1	–	0
No. 16 Georgia	5	–	0	–	1	9	–	2	–	1
Auburn	3	–	2	–	1	6	–	4	–	1
LSU	3	–	3	–	0	8	–	4	–	0
Tennessee	3	–	3	–	0	5	–	5	–	1
Florida	3	–	3	–	0	4	–	7	–	0
Mississippi State	2	–	4	–	0	6	–	5	–	0
Ole Miss	2	–	4	–	0	5	–	6	–	0
Kentucky	2	–	4	–	0	4	–	6	–	1
Vanderbilt	0	–	6	–	0	2	–	9	–	0
$ – Conference champion; Rankings from AP Poll

The 1978 Ole Miss Rebels football team represented the University of Mississippi (Ole Miss) during the 1978 NCAA Division I-A football season as a member of the Southeastern Conference (SEC). The team was led by head coach Steve Sloan, in his first year, and they played their home games at Hemingway Stadium in Oxford, Mississippi, and Mississippi Memorial Stadium in Jackson, Mississippi. Some of the outstanding players on the team of that year were Bobby Garner, Leon Perry, Reginald Woullard, Roy Coleman, Freddie Williams, etc. They finished the season with a record of five wins and six losses (5–6, 2–4 SEC).

== Schedule ==
Date	Opponent	Site	TV	Result	Attendance	Source
September 9	Memphis State*	Mississippi Veterans Memorial Stadium; Jackson, MS (rivalry)		W 14–7	47,535	
September 23	at No. 17 Missouri*	Faurot Field; Columbia, MO		L 14–45	60,287	
September 30	Southern Miss*	Mississippi Veterans Memorial Stadium; Jackson, MS		W 16–13	42,756	
October 7	at Georgia	Sanford Stadium; Athens, GA		L 3–42	58,800	
October 14	Kentucky^{†}	Hemingway Stadium; Oxford, MS		L 17–24	38,290	
October 21	at South Carolina*	Williams–Brice Stadium; Columbia, SC		L 17–18	50,226	
October 28	at Vanderbilt	Dudley Field; Nashville, TN (rivalry)		W 35–10	25,043	
November 4	at No. 12 LSU	Tiger Stadium; Baton Rouge, LA (rivalry)	ABC	L 8–30	73,120	
November 11	Tulane*	Hemingway Stadium; Oxford, MS (rivalry)		W 13–3	28,500	
November 18	at Tennessee	Neyland Stadium; Knoxville, TN (rivalry)		L 17–41	83,210	
November 25	vs. Mississippi State	Mississippi Veterans Memorial Stadium; Jackson, MS (Egg Bowl)		W 27–7	47,012	
*Non-conference game; ^{†}Homecoming; Rankings from AP Poll released prior to the game

== Roster ==
1978 Ole Miss Rebels football team roster
Players
Coaches
Offense

Pos.	#	Name	Class
QB		John Fourcade	Fr
QB		Bobby Garner (C)
RB	20	Leon Perry	Jr

Defense

Pos.	#	Name	Class

Special teams

Pos.	#	Name	Class

Head coach

- Steve Sloan

Coordinators/assistant coaches

- Romeo Crennel Defensive Ends Coach

Legend

- (C) Team captain
- (S) Suspended
- (I) Ineligible
- Injured
- Redshirt

== Game summaries ==
=== Mississippi State ===
Team	1	2	3	4	Total
Mississippi State	0	0	7	0	7
• Ole Miss	0	17	0	10	27

- Date: November 25
- Location: Mississippi Veterans Memorial Stadium, Jackson, MS
- Game attendance: 47,012

Scoring summary
2	MISS	Langley 24 yard field goal	MISS 3-0
2	MISS	Perry 6 yard run (Langley kick)	MISS 10-0
2	MISS	Kimbrough 57 yard pass from Fourcade (Langley kick)	MISS 17-0
3	MSU	McDole 29 yard pass from Jones (Fratesi kick)	MISS 17-7
4	MISS	Langley 43 yard field goal	MISS 20-7
4	MISS	Perry 3 yard run (Langley kick)	MISS 27-7
