= 1978 LSU Tigers football team =

American college football season

1978 LSU Tigers football

Liberty Bowl, L 15–20 vs. Missouri
- Conference: Southeastern Conference
- Record: 8–4 (3–3 SEC)
- Head coach: Charles McClendon (17th season)
- Home stadium: Tiger Stadium

1978 Southeastern Conference football standings
	Conf.					Overall
Team	W		L		T	W		L		T
No. 1 Alabama $	6	–	0	–	0	11	–	1	–	0
No. 16 Georgia	5	–	0	–	1	9	–	2	–	1
Auburn	3	–	2	–	1	6	–	4	–	1
LSU	3	–	3	–	0	8	–	4	–	0
Tennessee	3	–	3	–	0	5	–	5	–	1
Florida	3	–	3	–	0	4	–	7	–	0
Mississippi State	2	–	4	–	0	6	–	5	–	0
Ole Miss	2	–	4	–	0	5	–	6	–	0
Kentucky	2	–	4	–	0	4	–	6	–	1
Vanderbilt	0	–	6	–	0	2	–	9	–	0
$ – Conference champion; Rankings from AP Poll

The 1978 LSU Tigers football team represented Louisiana State University (LSU) as a member of the Southeastern Conference (SEC) during the 1978 NCAA Division I-A football season. Led by 17th-year head coach Charles McClendon, the Tigers compiled an overall record of 8–4, with a mark of 3–3 in conference play, and finished tied for fourth in the SEC.

== Schedule ==
Date	Opponent	Rank	Site	TV	Result	Attendance	Source
September 16	Indiana*	No. 13	Tiger Stadium; Baton Rouge, LA		W 24–17	78,534	
September 23	Wake Forest*	No. 10	Tiger Stadium; Baton Rouge, LA		W 13–11	77,197	
September 30	at Rice*	No. 11	Rice Stadium; Houston, TX		W 37–7	50,000	
October 7	at Florida	No. 11	Florida Field; Gainesville, FL (rivalry)		W 34–21	55,457	
October 14	Georgia^{†}	No. 11	Tiger Stadium; Baton Rouge, LA		L 17–24	77,158	
October 21	at Kentucky	No. 16	Commonwealth Stadium; Lexington, KY		W 21–0	57,918	
November 4	Ole Miss	No. 12	Tiger Stadium; Baton Rouge, LA (rivalry)	ABC	W 30–8	73,120	
November 11	at No. 3 Alabama	No. 10	Legion Field; Birmingham, AL (rivalry)	ABC	L 10–31	76,831	
November 18	at Mississippi State	No. 17	Mississippi Veterans Memorial Stadium; Jackson, MS (rivalry)		L 14–16	44,200	
November 25	Tulane*		Tiger Stadium; Baton Rouge, LA (Battle for the Rag)		W 40–21	75,876	
December 2	Wyoming*		Tiger Stadium; Baton Rouge, LA		W 24–17	64,458	
December 23	vs. No. 18 Missouri*		Liberty Bowl Memorial Stadium; Memphis, TN (Liberty Bowl)	ABC	L 15–20	53,064	
*Non-conference game; ^{†}Homecoming; Rankings from AP Poll released prior to the game

== Roster ==
1978 LSU Tigers football team roster
Players
Coaches
Offense

Pos.	#	Name	Class
RB	4	Charles Alexander	Sr
WR	3	Carlos Carson	Jr
OT	72	Robert Dugas	Sr
QB	5	Steve Ensminger	Jr
FB	47	Hokie Gajan	So
QB	8	David Woodley	Jr

Defense

Pos.	#	Name	Class
DE	86	John Adams	Jr
DB	37	Willie Teal	Jr

Special teams

Pos.	#	Name	Class

Head coach

- Charles McClendon

Coordinators/assistant coaches

Legend

- (C) Team captain
- (S) Suspended
- (I) Ineligible
- Injured
- Redshirt
