= 1978 Liberty Bowl =

American college football game

- 20th Liberty Bowl
LSU Tigers	Missouri Tigers
(8–3)	(7–4)
SEC	Big Eight
15	20
Head coach: Charles McClendon	Head coach: Warren Powers
	AP 18
	1	2	3	4	Total
LSU	3	0	6	6	15
Missouri	7	13	0	0	20
- Date: December 23, 1978
- Season: 1978
- Stadium: Liberty Bowl Memorial Stadium
- Location: Memphis, Tennessee
- MVP: James Wilder Sr. (RB, Missouri)
- Referee: Robert E. Carpenter (ACC)
- Attendance: 53,064

United States TV coverage
- Network: ABC
- Announcers: Chris Schenkel, Ara Parseghian and Verne Lundquist

The 1978 Liberty Bowl, a college football postseason bowl game, took place on December 23, 1978, at Liberty Bowl Memorial Stadium in Memphis, Tennessee. The competing teams in the 20th edition of the Liberty Bowl were the LSU Tigers of the Southeastern Conference (SEC) and the Missouri Tigers of the Big Eight Conference. Missouri defeated LSU by a final score of 20–15.

== Teams ==
=== LSU ===
The 1978 LSU squad finished the regular season with a record of 8–3 and losses against Alabama, Georgia and Mississippi State. The appearance marked the first for LSU in the Liberty Bowl, and the school's 21st overall bowl game.

=== Missouri ===
The 1978 Missouri squad finished the regular season with a record of 7–4 and losses against Alabama, Colorado, Oklahoma and Oklahoma State. The appearance marked the first for Missouri in the Liberty Bowl, and the school's fifteenth overall bowl game.

== Game summary ==
=== Scoring summary ===
Scoring summary

Quarter	Time	Drive			Team	Scoring information	Score	
Quarter	Time	Plays	Yards	TOP	Team	Scoring information	LSU	Missouri
1					Missouri	Earl Gant 15-yard touchdown run, Jeff Brockhaus kick good	0	7
1					LSU	37-yard field goal by Mike Conway	3	7
2					Missouri	Kellen Winslow 16-yard touchdown reception from Phil Bradley, Jeff Brockhaus kick good	3	14
2					Missouri	James Wilder Sr. 3-yard touchdown run, Jeff Brockhaus kick no good	3	20
3					LSU	Charles Alexander 1-yard touchdown run, Mike Conway kick no good	9	20
4					LSU	David Woodley 1-yard touchdown run, kick - 2 pt attempt no good	15	20
"TOP" = time of possession. For other American football terms, see Glossary of American football.							15	20

=== Statistics ===
Statistics	LSU	MU
First downs	12	18
Plays–yards	77–364	71–317
Rushes–yards	46–194	50–200
Passing yards	170	117
Passing: Comp–Att–Int	14–31–4	11–21–1

== Aftermath ==
Each program later returned to the Liberty Bowl: Missouri lost to Purdue in 1980, then lost to Oklahoma State in 2018, while LSU fell to Baylor in 1985.

Missouri joined the Southeastern Conference (SEC) in 2012 after playing 16 seasons in the Big 12, which was formed in 1996 when four schools from the former Southwest Conference combined with the Big Eight.

LSU defeated Missouri, 42–7, at Baton Rouge on October 1, 2016, in the first regular season meeting between the schools in what was also Ed Orgeron's first game as LSU head coach. Four years later, Eli Drinkwitz earned his first victory as Missouri coach with a 45-41 decision over LSU at Columbia. The game was originally scheduled for Baton Rouge, but moved three days prior to kickoff due to the approach of Hurricane Delta to the Louisiana coast. The teams are scheduled to meet October 7, 2023 at Columbia.
