= 1979 Orange Bowl =

American college football game

- 45th Orange Bowl
- The Miami Orange Bowl in Miami, Florida, hosted the Orange Bowl.
Oklahoma Sooners	Nebraska Cornhuskers
(10–1)	(9–2)
Big Eight	Big Eight
31	24
Head coach: Barry Switzer	Head coach: Tom Osborne
AP / Coaches; 4 / 4	AP / Coaches; 6 / 6
	1	2	3	4	Total
Oklahoma	7	7	17	0	31
Nebraska	7	0	3	14	24
- Date: January 1, 1979
- Season: 1978
- Stadium: Orange Bowl
- Location: Miami, Florida
- MVP: Billy Sims (Oklahoma HB); Reggie Kinlaw (Oklahoma NG)
- Favorite: Oklahoma by 11½ points
- Referee: Ken Faulkner (SWC)
- Attendance: 66,365

United States TV coverage
- Network: NBC
- Announcers: Dick Enberg and Merlin Olsen
- Nielsen ratings: 22.8

The 1979 Orange Bowl was the 45th edition of the college football bowl game, played at the Orange Bowl in Miami, Florida, on Monday, January 1. Part of the 1978–79 bowl game season, it matched the fourth-ranked Oklahoma Sooners and #6 Nebraska Cornhuskers, both of the Big Eight Conference.

This matchup was an anomaly: It featured a rare rematch of conference rivals that played every regular season. Nebraska had upset #1 Oklahoma 17–14 on November 11 in Lincoln, their first win in the rivalry since the Game of the Century in 1971, and appeared headed toward a national championship showdown with Penn State. But unranked Missouri (6–4) stunned the #2 Huskers 35–31 in Lincoln the following week, dropping Nebraska into a tie with Oklahoma for the Big Eight championship and knocking them out of the national championship picture.

Penn State instead faced Alabama for the national title in the Sugar Bowl, and the Orange Bowl found itself with a selection dilemma. Nebraska earned the Big Eight's automatic Orange Bowl berth by virtue of its victory over the Sooners, but, with Penn State and Notre Dame (which accepted an invitation to the Cotton Bowl) off the board, the Orange Bowl committee decided to set up a bowl rematch with Oklahoma to create the best possible matchup. This was the last time a non-championship postseason bowl featured two teams from the same conference until the 2015 season at the Arizona Bowl, and the last non-championship bowl to be a rematch of a regular-season conference game until the 2025 season at the Birmingham Bowl.

Despite the road loss to the Huskers in the regular season, Oklahoma was a double-digit favorite.

== Game summary ==
Underdog Nebraska scored first on a 21-yard touchdown pass from Tom Sorley to Tim Smith for a 7–0 lead. Oklahoma tied the score on a 3-yard scamper by Heisman Trophy winner Billy Sims, and then went ahead in the second quarter when quarterback Thomas Lott scored on a three-yard run, and took the 14–7 lead into halftime.

The revenge-minded Sooners then took control. In the third quarter, Sims scored again an eleven-yard run. Field goals were traded, then Lott scored from two yards out, increasing Oklahoma's lead to 31–10.

Nebraska rallied late, with Rick Berns scoring on a one-yard run, and then Sorley threw a two-yard strike to tight end Junior Miller as time expired. Oklahoma prevailed 31–24 to finish at 11–1, avenging its only loss of the season.

The game was televised by NBC and the traditional halftime Festival of Lights show was a tribute to "the greatest entertainment phenomenon in America in 1978: Disco!" Besides dancing to recorded disco songs, there was an appearance by KC and the Sunshine Band.

=== Scoring ===
First quarter

- Nebraska – Tim Smith 21-yard pass from Tom Sorley (Billy Todd kick), 8:29
- Oklahoma – Billy Sims 3-yard run (Uwe von Schamann kick), 0:01

Second quarter

- Oklahoma – Thomas Lott 3-yard run (von Schamann kick), 6:22

Third quarter

- Oklahoma – Sims 11-yard run (von Schamann kick), 13:30
- Oklahoma – von Schamann 26-yard field goal, 9:18
- Nebraska – Todd 31-yard field goal, 4:24
- Oklahoma – Lott 2-yard run (von Schamann kick), 0:15

Fourth quarter

- Nebraska – Rick Berns 1-yard run (Todd kick), 9:12
- Nebraska – Junior Miller 2-yard pass from Sorley (Todd kick), 0:00

== Statistics ==
Statistics	Oklahoma	Nebraska
First downs	17	27
Rushes–yards	53–292	54–217
Passing yards	47	220
Passes (C–A–I)	2–3–0	18–31–2
Total offense	56–339	85–437
Punts–average	3–39.3	2–37.5
Fumbles–lost	1–1	0–0
Turnovers	1	2
Penalties–yards	6–50	8–96

== Aftermath ==
Oklahoma (11–1) climbed to third in the final AP poll and Nebraska (9–3) fell to eighth.

== See also ==
- List of college football post-season games that were rematches of regular season games
- Nebraska–Oklahoma football rivalry
