= 1979 Sugar Bowl =

American college football game

- 45th Sugar Bowl "The Game for the National Championship"
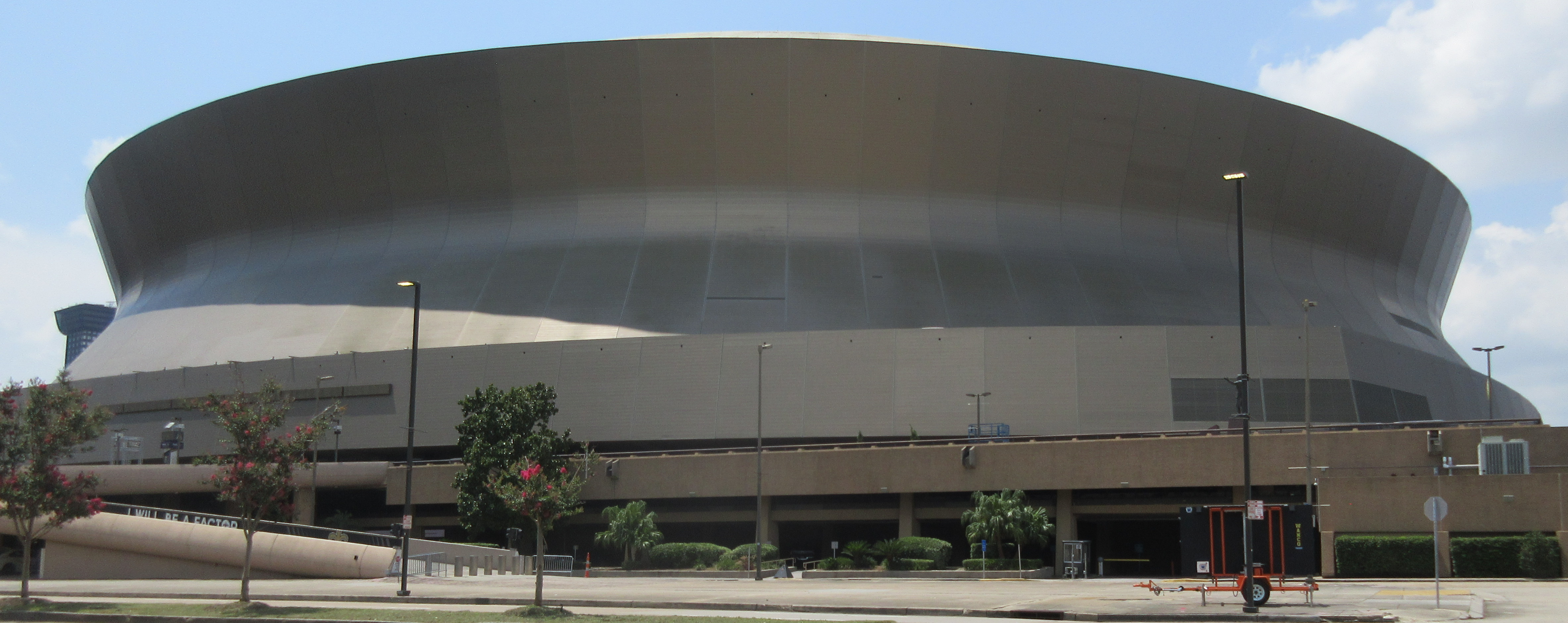
- The Louisiana Superdome in New Orleans, Louisiana, hosted the Sugar Bowl.
Penn State Nittany Lions	Alabama Crimson Tide
(11–0)	(10–1)
Independent	SEC
7	14
Head coach: Joe Paterno	Head coach: Bear Bryant
AP / Coaches; 1 / 1	AP / Coaches; 2 / 2
	1	2	3	4	Total
Penn State	0	0	7	0	7
Alabama	0	7	7	0	14
- Date: January 1, 1979
- Season: 1978
- Stadium: Louisiana Superdome
- Location: New Orleans, Louisiana
- MVP: Barry Krauss (Alabama LB)
- Favorite: Alabama by 1 point
- Referee: Bill Jennings (Big Eight)
- Attendance: 76,824

United States TV coverage
- Network: ABC
- Announcers: Keith Jackson, Frank Broyles

The 1979 Sugar Bowl was the 45th edition of the college football bowl game, played at the Louisiana Superdome in New Orleans, Louisiana, on Monday, January 1. Part of the 1978–79 bowl game season, it matched the top-ranked Penn State Nittany Lions (11–0) and the #2 Alabama Crimson Tide (10–1) of the Southeastern Conference (SEC). A hard-fought 14–7 victory gave Alabama head coach Bear Bryant a share of a fifth national championship, as the AP Poll voters ranked Alabama as No. 1. The University of Southern California was voted national champion in the Coaches Poll.

The game marked the official debut of Alabama's "Big Al" costumed elephant mascot.

== Teams ==
=== Penn State ===
The previous year, Penn State had gone 11–1 and won the Fiesta Bowl, with their only loss coming in a four-point heartbreaker to Kentucky at home. After surviving a very close opener in 1978 against Temple, Penn State rolled the rest of the season to a perfect 11–0 record and the top spot in both major polls. While some games were relatively close, the Nittany Lions generally won with ease. The defense, ranked first in the nation in scoring defense, led the charge, as they held opposing teams to ten points or less eight times, with three shutouts. In the final week of the regular season, Penn State defeated rival Pittsburgh 17–10 to finish an undefeated regular season.

=== Alabama ===
The previous year, Alabama had gone 11–1, losing only to Nebraska, and steamrolled Ohio State 35–6 in the Sugar Bowl. Coming into that day, Alabama was third in the country, and when the top two teams lost, the Crimson Tide thought they were national champions. It was not to be, however, as Notre Dame, rolled over #1 Texas by four touchdowns in the Cotton Bowl, and jumped from fifth to first to become national champions. Feeling robbed, the Crimson Tide used it as motivation for the 1978 season. Alabama, however, suffered an early season loss to USC at Legion Field. Bryant, who as athletic director made the schedules, later admitted he made a mistake and made the five-game non-conference schedule exceptionally difficult in 1978; it included a brutal opener against Nebraska, Missouri, USC, and Washington in Seattle later in the season. The Tide, however, rebounded quite well from the loss, and went on a tear. Aside from a narrow victory against Washington, the defending Rose Bowl champions, Alabama dominated the rest of the schedule. After beating in-state rival Auburn 34–16 in the annual Iron Bowl, Alabama finished the season 10–1 and in the thick of the national championship race, second in both major polls.

== The matchup forms ==
After the end of the regular season, it was a toss-up as to who would play where in the bowl games. Joe Paterno, head coach of Penn State, wanted to play in the Orange Bowl, which would be the last game of the night and would give Penn State the nation's undivided attention. Moreover, Paterno wanted his vaunted defense to face Oklahoma running back Billy Sims, the Heisman Trophy winner.

Bryant wanted things differently. Bryant hoped, along with Sugar Bowl committee member Aruns Callery, that he could get Penn State to agree to face Alabama in a #1 v. #2 matchup in the Sugar Bowl. Bryant was wary of the pollsters after the shun to end the 1977 season, but he knew that if number two Alabama could beat number one Penn State, the Crimson Tide would be guaranteed a national championship regardless of what else happened with other teams.

Finally, after the urging of Callery, Bryant called Paterno and attempted to coax him into meeting the Tide in the Sugar Bowl. Bryant recounted to Paterno that the two schools and coaches had a great Sugar Bowl matchup in December 1975, which the Tide won narrowly 13–6, and that he wanted to do it again. After several calls, Bryant finally convinced Paterno, and the matchup was on.

== Pre-game information ==
The game kicked off shortly after 1:00 p.m. CST, televised by ABC with Keith Jackson on play-by-play and the color commentary provided by Frank Broyles, the former Arkansas head coach. At the same time was the Cotton Bowl on CBS.

Alabama came into the game as a narrow one-point favorite.

Alabama was the home team, and wore its crimson jerseys with its usual crimson helmets and white pants with the two crimson stripes. As the visitors, Penn State wore white jerseys with the usual white helmets (with navy blue center stripe) and all-white pants.

Much of the pre-game hype surrounded the matchup between the Penn State defense and Alabama offense. Penn State had, arguably, its best defense ever under Paterno, and was an immovable object against the run. Alabama, on the other hand, was known for its hard-nosed rushing attack out of the wishbone. However, the x-factor in the game was that Alabama was to be the first team that Penn State would face all season that ran the wishbone, a difficult-to-stop formation that forces defenses to cover the entire field against both the run and the pass. Most pre-game predictions hinged on this, and whether or not Paterno would call a conservative game on offense.

== The game ==
=== First quarter ===
The game started off with what was expected by most: a defensive struggle. Alabama attempted to run the ball hard out of the wishbone, as expected, and while it did have some success, each and every time the Penn State defense would toughen more and more the further Alabama moved the ball, eventually forcing punts. The Penn State offense, on the other hand, was simply non-existent. The Alabama defense was great in its own right, and Penn State literally struggled to gain a positive yard. As the first quarter came to a close, the game was tied 0–0.

=== Second quarter ===
The first twelve minutes of the second quarter went just like the first quarter, i.e. a defensive struggle with little or no offensive success. Finally, with about three minutes to go in the second quarter, Alabama seemingly was about to break through. After getting good field position via a Penn State punt, Alabama found itself at the Penn State 22–yard line with a 1st and 10. Alabama quarterback Jeff Rutledge dropped back to throw, and was hit as he attempted to deliver the ball. The pass sailed high, and was intercepted by linebacker Rich Milot. Milot raced down the sideline with one man to beat. Major Ogilvie, who was on the other side of the field at the time of the interception, raced diagonally across the Superdome turf and knocked Milot out of bounds at the Alabama 37. At this point, Penn State was in field goal range and looked to break the 0–0 tie before halftime. However, on third down, Penn State quarterback Chuck Fusina was sacked for a big loss by Alabama's Byron Braggs, putting Penn State out of field goal range.

Penn State punted to Alabama with one minute, thirty-two seconds left in the first half. The Tide started at its own 20, and Ogilvie ran for two yards on first down. Paterno chose to call time-out, hoping that he could preserve the clock and force an Alabama punt, which would hopefully give Penn State a chance to get back into field goal range. Alabama, however, took advantage, when two plays later Steve Whitman rushed for four yards and a first down. Paterno's gamble had backfired, and now Bryant had another opportunity. Ever the opportunist, Bryant swung for the fences. On the subsequent play, Tide fullback Tony Nathan ran for 30 yards, and followed it with another seven-yard run, down to the Penn State 30. Bryant called timeout, and Alabama came out throwing. Rutledge fired a strike to a diving Bruce Bolton in the endzone, and Alabama had broken the tie, 7–0.

=== Halftime ===
At halftime, Alabama was seemingly the better team on paper. Against the number-one ranked Penn State defense, Alabama had racked up 214 yards, 129 of which were on the ground, and carried a touchdown lead at intermission.

On the other hand, Penn State struggled greatly in the first half. Although the defense kept Alabama mostly out of the endzone, the Tide still racked up plenty of yards. The Penn State offense, though, was simply manhandled. At the end of the first half, Penn State had -7 yards rushing, and only 29 yards passing, thus gaining only 22 total yards in the first half.

=== Third quarter ===
Alabama looked to further cement their lead after a solid drive in the third quarter that saw the Tide go deep into Penn State territory. Penn State, however, got tough again as the Tide drove further, and ultimately forced a field goal attempt. The usually reliable Alan McElroy, however, missed a chip-shot field goal that would have put Alabama up 10–0.

After that, though, the Penn State defense would make adjustments. To avoid big passing plays like those that doomed them at the end of the first half, Paterno and company chose to keep the free safety deep in case of a pass. Sure enough, the next time Rutledge went back to throw deep, Penn State safety Pete Harris snagged an interception and returned it to Alabama territory. A few plays later, Fusina finally connected with his star end Scott Fitzkee for a 17-yard touchdown pass, and the game was tied 7–7.

Late in the third quarter, the game was still tied 7–7, and Penn State was forced to punt. Usually, Major Ogilvie returned punts for Alabama, but on a hunch, Bryant decided to use Lou Ikner, a speedy senior who had seen limited action. As it turned out, Bryant picked the right time to gamble. Ikner fielded the punt, and raced down the left sideline, before cutting back to the middle of the field to cap a 62–yard punt return, giving the Tide a first and goal at the Penn State ten. However, the Penn State defense got tough, and held Alabama to no gain on first and second down. On third down, Bryant and offensive coordinator Mal Moore thought Penn State would be playing a pass, and thus called an option left. Jeff Rutledge took the snap and spun away from center around left end, and a very surprised Penn State defense, which as Bryant and Moore had predicted were expecting a pass, was in no position to defend it. Rutledge forced the sole defender to commit to him, and when he did he pitched the ball to the trailing back, Major Ogilvie, who ran in untouched for the touchdown.

Alabama, once more, was on top. The third quarter ended with Alabama up 14–7, one quarter away from a national championship.

=== Fourth quarter ===
After getting the ball early in the fourth quarter, Penn State could do nothing. The Crimson Tide defense seemed stronger than ever, and Penn State simply could not move the ball effectively. The clock was running, and finally Alabama regained possession of the ball following a Penn State punt with eight minutes to play. The Nittany Lions were desperate, and everyone knew it; they needed a turnover. Alabama had the ball on its own 22-yard line when Rutledge ran an option left. He engaged a Penn State defender, and pitched the ball to Major Ogilvie. However, Ogilvie was not expecting a pitch and was in fact not even looking at Rutledge; the ball bounced off of Ogilvie's back and Penn State recovered the fumble deep in Alabama territory.

Now with all of the momentum, Penn State found quick success. On first down, Penn State running back Matt Suhey charged up the middle for 11 yards, and Penn State had it first and goal on the Alabama eight-yard-line. On first and goal, Penn State ran the ball, which netted about two yards. On second and goal, Fusina came out firing to Fitzkee, who caught the ball at about the three and seemed destined to score. There was no Alabama defender in sight, and Fitzkee seemingly could walk in. As he turned to run into the endzone, however, Alabama cornerback Don McNeal came flying up from his position, finally free from a tangle with a wide receiver, and delivered a picture-perfect hit on Fitzkee, using his own momentum to drive him out of bounds at the one-yard line. The commentators of the game, Jackson and Broyles, gushed over the incredible tackle by McNeal. Fitzkee, who thought he had a sure touchdown, would say after the game, "I have no clue where the Alabama defensive back came from." Now came third and goal, where Penn State ran the ball straight-ahead with Matt Suhey. After finding no hole, Suhey tried to dive in for the touchdown, but was met in the air by Curtis McGriff, a defensive tackle, and Rich Wingo, the middle linebacker. After the play, Fusina frantically searched for the ball, and asked Alabama linebacker Marty Lyons how far it was from the goalline. Lyons replied, "'Bout a foot. You better pass."

Finally, it was fourth and goal from the one-foot line with a national championship on the line. Penn State chose to power it in, but Alabama would have none of it. Again, Alabama surged backward through the Penn State line, and Guman was hit in the hole by Barry Krauss and Murray Legg, where he was stopped dead in his tracks. The Alabama defense had held after a thunderous collision just short of the goal line. Krauss, the man who delivered the brunt of the hit, was knocked unconscious and temporarily lost feeling in his extremities, but he would get up and run off the field under his own power.

Alabama had held, but the game was not over. Roughly six minutes were still left, and Alabama was pinned up deep in its own territory. Penn State needed a stop and quickly got it. Alabama went three-and-out, and was forced to punt. On fourth down, the snap was botched and bounced to Alabama punter Woody Umphrey, who subsequently had to hurry the punt, resulting in a shank that went out of bounds near the Alabama 30. Penn State, though, had cost themselves. They were flagged for having twelve-men on the field, which gave Alabama a first down and new life.

The Tide subsequently drove the ball farther and farther, nearly running out the clock. Penn State got the ball back with over a minute left, but their last drive came up short, ending on a 4th and 8 attempt by Chuck Fusina that fell incomplete.

Linebacker Krauss was named the player of the game.

== Scoring summary ==
Quarter	Team	Scoring Summary	Score	
Quarter	Team	Scoring Summary	Penn State	Alabama
2	Alabama	Bruce Bolton 30–yard reception from Jeff Rutledge, Alan McElroy kick good	0	7
3	Penn State	Scott Fitzkee 17–yard reception from Chuck Fusina	7	7
3	Alabama	Major Ogilvie 8-yard rush, Alan McElroy kick good	7	14
Final Score			7	14

== Statistics ==
Statistics	Alabama	Penn State
First downs	12	12
Rushing yards	60–208	38–19
Passing yards	91	163
Passing	8–15–2	15–30–4
Total offense	75–299	68–182
Punts–average	10–38.8	10–38.7
Fumbles–lost	2–1	2–0
Turnovers	3	4
Penalties–yards	11–75	8–51
