= Warren Powers =

American football player and coach (1941–2021)

Biographical details
- Born: February 19, 1941; Kansas City, Missouri, U.S.
- Died: November 2, 2021 (aged 80); St. Louis, Missouri, U.S.

Playing career
- 1960–1962: Nebraska
- 1963–1968: Oakland Raiders
- Positions: Running back, defensive back

Coaching career (HC unless noted)
- 1969–1976: Nebraska (DB)
- 1977: Washington State
- 1978–1984: Missouri

Head coaching record
- Overall: 53–37–3
- Bowls: 3–2

Accomplishments and honors

Awards
- Walter Camp Coach of the Year Award (1978); Big Eight Coach of the Year (1983)

Warren Anthony Powers (February 19, 1941 – November 2, 2021) was an American football player and coach. He was the head coach at Washington State University in 1977, and the University of Missouri from 1978 through 1984, compiling an overall college football record of 53–37–3 (.586).

== Early life ==
Powers was an all-state high school quarterback at Bishop Lillis High School from Kansas City, Missouri, and played college football at Nebraska, earning three letters as a Husker. As a senior, he helped lead Bob Devaney's first Nebraska team in 1962.

Powers played professionally for six years in the American Football League (AFL) with the Oakland Raiders. As a safety, he started for the 1967 AFL Champion Raiders and in the second AFL-NFL World Championship game, known now as Super Bowl II.

== Coaching career ==
Following his playing career, Powers was an assistant coach under both Bob Devaney and Tom Osborne at the University of Nebraska from 1969 through 1976.

After leaving Nebraska, Powers became the head coach at Washington State. One year after he left Nebraska, Powers took his unranked Washington State Cougars into Lincoln and knocked off the fifteenth-ranked Huskers in the season opener at Memorial Stadium.

The following year in 1978, Powers became the head coach at Missouri. With the Missouri Tigers, Powers again went to Lincoln with another unranked team and pulled off a victory over the second-ranked Nebraska team. Following that game, it would be another 25 years until 2003 when the Missouri Tigers would again defeat the Nebraska Cornhuskers. During his tenure at Missouri, Powers compiled a 46–33–3 (.579) record, including four straight bowl appearances from 1978 to 1981. His best seasons came in 1980 and 1981, where he posted consecutive 8–4 records. In addition, his Tiger football teams went 3–2 in bowl games, defeating LSU in the 1978 Liberty Bowl, South Carolina in the 1979 Hall of Fame Classic, and Southern Miss in the 1981 Tangerine Bowl. During Powers' tensure, Missouri also played in the 1980 Liberty Bowl, losing to Purdue, and the 1983 Holiday Bowl, losing to a BYU Cougars team led by quarterback Steve Young.

On October 24, 1979, the NCAA's Committee on Infractions publicly reprimanded Missouri for a violation of NCAA Constitution related to a failure to exercise institutional control. The violation was in regard to the use of a fund established outside the university for the purpose of paying Powers for debt he assumed while negotiating to become Missouri's head coach. NCAA regulations require the university's involvement when its coach receives a cash supplement related to duties he is performing on the institution's behalf, and the NCAA found that Missouri had failed to do so.

After a disappointing 3–7–1 season in 1984 that concluded with another loss to rival Kansas, Powers was relieved of his duties.

== Death ==
Powers died on November 2, 2021, in St. Louis, after suffering from Alzheimer's disease.

== Head coaching record ==
Year	Team	Overall	Conference	Standing	Bowl/playoffs	Coaches^{#}	AP^{°}
Washington State Cougars (Pacific-8 Conference) (1977)
1977	Washington State	6-5	3–4	T–4th			
Washington State:		6-5	3–4				
Missouri Tigers (Big Eight Conference) (1978–1984)
1978	Missouri	8–4	4–3	T–3rd	W Liberty	14	15
1979	Missouri	7–5	3–4	4th	W Hall of Fame Classic	20	
1980	Missouri	8–4	5–2	3rd	L Liberty		
1981	Missouri	8–4	3–4	5th	W Tangerine	20	19
1982	Missouri	5–4–2	2–3–2	5th			
1983	Missouri	7–5	5–2	T–2nd	L Holiday		
1984	Missouri	3–7–1	2–4–1	T–5th			
Missouri:		46–33–3	24–22–3				
Total:		52–38–3					
^{#}Rankings from final Coaches Poll.; ^{°}Rankings from final AP Poll.

== See also ==
- List of American Football League players
