= 1978 Oklahoma Sooners football team =

American college football season

1978 Oklahoma Sooners football
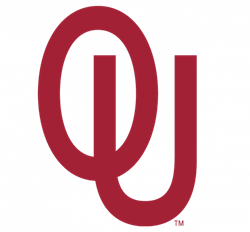

National champion (8 selectors) Big 8 co-champion Orange Bowl champion

Orange Bowl, W 31–24 vs. Nebraska
- Conference: Big Eight Conference

Ranking
- Coaches: No. 3
- AP: No. 3
- Record: 11–1 (6–1 Big 8)
- Head coach: Barry Switzer (6th season)
- Offensive coordinator: Galen Hall (6th season)
- Offensive scheme: Wishbone
- Defensive coordinator: Rex Norris (1st season)
- Base defense: 5–2
- Captains: Daryl Hunt; Thomas Lott; Greg Roberts; Phil Tabor
- Home stadium: Oklahoma Memorial Stadium

1978 Big Eight Conference football standings
	Conf.					Overall
Team	W		L		T	W		L		T
No. 3 Oklahoma +	6	–	1	–	0	11	–	1	–	0
No. 8 Nebraska +	6	–	1	–	0	9	–	3	–	0
No. 15 Missouri	4	–	3	–	0	8	–	4	–	0
Iowa State	4	–	3	–	0	8	–	4	–	0
Kansas State	3	–	4	–	0	4	–	7	–	0
Oklahoma State	3	–	4	–	0	3	–	8	–	0
Colorado	2	–	5	–	0	6	–	5	–	0
Kansas	0	–	7	–	0	1	–	10	–	0
+ – Conference co-champions; Rankings from AP Poll

The 1978 Oklahoma Sooners football team represented the University of Oklahoma in the college football 1978 NCAA Division I-A season. Oklahoma Sooners football participated in the former Big Eight Conference at that time and played its home games in Oklahoma Memorial Stadium where it has played its home games since 1923. The team posted an 11–1 overall record and a 6–1 conference record to earn a share of the conference title under head coach Barry Switzer. This was Switzer's sixth conference title in six seasons since taking the helm in 1973.

The team was led by All-Americans Billy Sims (who won the Heisman Trophy), Daryl Hunt, Reggie Kinlaw, and Greg Roberts, The Sooners started the season with nine consecutive wins before losing to Nebraska. During the season, OU faced ranked opponents four times (#14 Missouri, #6 Texas, and #4 & #6 Nebraska); four different opponents finished the season ranked. Its only defeat came against Nebraska in their regular season match. The Sooners were able to avenge that loss as an at-large selection to the Orange Bowl against conference co-champions Nebraska, who had claimed the automatic berth by virtue of their victory over OU.

Sims led the nation in scoring with 132 points (based on per game average of 10.9, which includes 120 in 11 games). Sims led the team in rushing with a record-setting 1896 yards, Thomas Lott led the team in passing with 487 yards, Bobby Kimball led the team in receiving with 207 yards, Hunt led the team with 157 tackles and Darrol Ray posted 8 interceptions.

The 5001 yards rushing remain second in Oklahoma football history behind the 1971 team's 5635. The defense set the school's all-time record with 28 interceptions and tied the record of 50 forced turnovers. Daryl Hunt set the school record for career tackles. Billy Sims became the only Sooner to post four 200-yard games in a season. Sims' 1896 yards stood as the Sooner record until Adrian Peterson posted 1925 in 2004.

Billy Sims became the sixth junior to win the Heisman Trophy. Sims was the nation's leading rusher and scorer for 1978. He averaged 160.1 yards and 10.9 points. He set the Big Eight Conference single season rushing record of 1,762 yards on 231 carries for an average of 7.6 yards. Sims was the only back in the nation's top 50 to average 7.0 per carry, and became the first player in Big Eight history to rush for more than 300 yards in three straight games.

== Schedule ==
Date	Opponent	Rank	Site	TV	Result	Attendance	Source
September 9	at Stanford*	No. 4	Stanford Stadium; Stanford, CA		W 35–29	58,883	
September 16	West Virginia*	No. 3	Oklahoma Memorial Stadium; Norman, OK		W 52–10	71,187–71,885	
September 23	Rice*	No. 3	Oklahoma Memorial Stadium; Norman, OK		W 66–7	71,774	
September 30	No. 14 Missouri	No. 1	Oklahoma Memorial Stadium; Norman, OK (rivalry)		W 45–23	72,371	
October 7	vs. No. 6 Texas*	No. 1	Cotton Bowl; Dallas, TX (Red River Shootout)	ABC	W 31–10	72,032	
October 14	at Kansas	No. 1	Memorial Stadium; Lawrence, KS		W 17–16	40,450–44,450	
October 21	at Iowa State	No. 1	Cyclone Stadium; Ames, IA		W 34–6	49,862	
October 28	Kansas State	No. 1	Oklahoma Memorial Stadium; Norman, OK		W 56–19	72,105	
November 4	at Colorado	No. 1	Folsom Field; Boulder, CO		W 28–7	52,506	
November 11	at No. 4 Nebraska	No. 1	Memorial Stadium; Lincoln, NE (rivalry)	ABC	L 14–17	74,657	
November 18	Oklahoma State	No. 4	Oklahoma Memorial Stadium; Norman, OK (Bedlam Series)		W 62–7	72,339	
January 1, 1979	vs. No. 6 Nebraska	No. 4	Miami Orange Bowl; Miami, FL (Orange Bowl)	NBC	W 31–24	66,365	
*Non-conference game; Rankings from AP Poll released prior to the game

== Rankings ==
Ranking movements Legend: ██ Increase in ranking ██ Decrease in ranking т = Tied with team above or below
	Week														
Poll	Pre	1	2	3	4	5	6	7	8	9	10	11	12	13	Final
AP	4	3	3 т	1	1	1	1	1	1	1	4	4	4	4	3
Coaches Poll	2	2	2	1	1	1	1	1	1	1	4	3	4	4	3

== Game summaries ==
=== Stanford ===
#4 Oklahoma Sooners at Stanford Cardinals

Team	1	2	3	4	Total
• #4 Oklahoma	14	14	0	7	35
Stanford	7	3	10	9	29

- Date: Saturday, September 9
- Location: Stanford Stadium
- Game attendance: 58,883
- Source: Eugene Register-Guard

Scoring summary
1	OKLA	Sims 2-yard run (von Schamann kick)	OKLA 7-0
1	OKLA	Rhodes 70-yard pass from Lott (von Schamann kick)	OKLA 14-0
1	STAN	Margerum 7-yard pass from Dils (Naber kick)	OKLA 14-7
2	STAN	Naber 43-yard field goal	OKLA 14-10
2	OKLA	Lott 19-yard run (von Schamann kick)	OKLA 21-10
2	OKLA	Kimball 17-yard pass from Lott (von Schamann kick)	OKLA 28-10
3	STAN	Banks 4-yard pass from Dils (Naber kick)	OKLA 28-17
3	STAN	Naber 49-yard field goal	OKLA 28-20
4	OKLA	Lott 1-yard run (von Schamann kick)	OKLA 35-20
4	STAN	Safety, von Schamann intentionally downed ball in end zone	OKLA 35-22
4	STAN	Margerum 11-yard pass from Dils (Naber kick)	OKLA 35-29

=== West Virginia ===
Team	1	2	3	4	Total
West Virginia	0	3	0	7	10
• Oklahoma	17	14	14	7	52

- Date: September 16
- Location: Oklahoma Memorial Stadium
- Game attendance: 71,885

=== Rice ===
Team	1	2	3	4	Total
Rice	0	0	0	7	7
• Oklahoma	17	35	7	7	66

- Date: September 23
- Location: Oklahoma Memorial Stadium
- Game attendance: 71,774

=== Missouri ===
Missouri Tigers at Oklahoma Sooners

Quarter	1	2	3	4	Total
Missouri	0	7	2	14	23
Oklahoma	21	7	17	0	45

at Oklahoma Memorial Stadium • Norman, Oklahoma

- Game attendance: 72,371

=== Texas ===
#1 Oklahoma Sooners vs. #6 Texas Longhorns

Team	1	2	3	4	Total
#6 Texas	0	3	7	0	10
• #1 Oklahoma	7	10	7	7	31

- Date: Saturday, October 7
- Location: Cotton Bowl, Dallas, Texas
- Game attendance: 72,032
- Game weather: Sunny
- Television network: ABC
- Source: Palm Beach Post

Scoring summary
1	OKLA	Billy Sims 18-yard run (Uwe von Schamann kick)	OKLA 7-0
2	OKLA	Billy Sims 1-yard run (Uwe von Schamann kick)	OKLA 14-0
2	TEX	Russell Erxleben 26-yard field goal	OKLA 14-3
2	OKLA	Uwe von Schamann 35-yard field goal	OKLA 17-3
3	OKLA	Bobby Kimball 24-yard pass from Thomas Lott (Uwe von Schamann kick)	OKLA 24-3
3	TEX	Johnny Lam Jones 25-yard run (Russell Erxleben kick)	OKLA 24-10
4	OKLA	David Overstreet 2-yard run (Uwe von Schamann kick)	OKLA 31-10

Statistics

- OU: Billy Sims 25 Rush, 131 Yds (Sims had been injured in two previous meetings)

=== Kansas ===
Team	1	2	3	4	Total
• Oklahoma	10	0	0	7	17
Kansas	0	7	0	9	16

- Date: October 14
- Location: Memorial Stadium
- Game attendance: 44,450

=== Iowa State ===
Team	1	2	3	4	Total
• Oklahoma	21	6	7	0	34
Iowa St	0	6	0	0	6

- Date: October 21
- Location: Cyclone Stadium
- Game attendance: 49,82

=== Kansas State ===
Team	1	2	3	4	Total
Kansas St	0	7	12	0	19
• Oklahoma	21	14	0	21	56

- Date: October 28
- Location: Oklahoma Memorial Stadium
- Game attendance: 72,105

=== Colorado ===
Team	1	2	3	4	Total
• #1 Oklahoma	7	0	14	7	28
Colorado	0	7	0	0	7

- Date: November 4
- Location: Folsom Field
- Game attendance: 53,553

Scoring summary
1	OU	Lott 1-yard run (von Schamann kick)	OU 7-0
2	COL	Mayberry 4-yard run (Dadiotis kick)	Tied 7-7
3	OU	Sims 59-yard run (von Schamann kick)	OU 14-7
3	OU	Valora 20-yard pass from Lott (von Schamann kick)	OU 21-7
4	OU	King 74-yard run (von Schamann kick)	OU 28-7

=== Nebraska ===
Team	1	2	3	4	Total
Oklahoma	7	0	7	0	14
• Nebraska	0	7	7	3	17

- Date: November 11
- Location: Memorial Stadium
- Game start: 12:10 p.m. CST
- Game attendance: 74,567
- Referee: Earl Shostrom
- TV announcers (ABC): Keith Jackson and Frank Broyles

=== Oklahoma State ===
Team	1	2	3	4	Total
Oklahoma St	7	0	0	0	7
• Oklahoma	7	21	21	13	62

- Date: November 18
- Location: Oklahoma Memorial Stadium
- Game attendance: 72,339

=== Orange Bowl ===
Team	1	2	3	4	Total
• Oklahoma	7	7	17	0	31
Nebraska	7	0	3	14	24

- Date: January 1
- Location: Orange Bowl
- Game attendance: 66,365

== Roster ==
1978 Oklahoma Sooners football team roster
Players
Coaches
Offense

Pos.	#	Name	Class
HB	43	Vickey Ray Anderson	Sr
OT	63	Sam Claphan	Sr
G	75	Terry Crouch	So
TE	80	Victor Hicks	Sr
OT	92	Darrell Irvin	Jr
WR	21	Bobby Kimball	Sr
RB	30	Kenny King	Sr
QB	6	Thomas Lott	Sr
RB	11	Fred Nixon	Jr
OT	66	Louis Oubre	So
HB	22	David Overstreet	So
QB	7	Kelly Phelps	Fr
SE	24	Steve Rhodes	Jr
G	65	Greg Roberts	Sr
RB	34	Jimmy Rogers	Sr
RB	20	Billy Sims	Jr
OT	73	Paul Tabor	Jr
OT	61	Jeff Ward	Sr
QB	1	J. C. Watts	So
G	76	Steve Williams	Fr

Defense

Pos.	#	Name	Class
LB	28	George Cumby	Jr
DT	72	John Goodman	Fr
DE	90	Rusty Griffis	Sr
DB	33	Bud Hebert	Sr
LB	85	Daryl Hunt	Sr
DE	83	Mike Joyce	Jr
DT	62	Reggie Kinlaw	Sr
DE	58	Reggie Mathis	Sr
CB	3	Darrol Ray	Jr
DE	41	Mike Rilley	So
DT	74	Phil Tabor	Sr
DT	96	Richard Turner	So

Special teams

Pos.	#	Name	Class
K	10	Uwe von Schamann	Sr

Head coach

- Barry Switzer

Coordinators/assistant coaches

- Donnie Duncan
- Gary Gibbs (LB)
- Galen Hall (OC)
- Warren Harper (LB)
- Rex Norris (DC)
- Jerry Pettibone
- Charlie Sadler (OL)
- Lucious Selmon (DL)

Legend

- (C) Team captain
- (S) Suspended
- (I) Ineligible
- Injured
- Redshirt

Roster

== Awards and honors ==
- All-American: Billy Sims, Daryl Hunt, Reggie Kinlaw, Greg Roberts,
- Greg Roberts, Outland Trophy
- Billy Sims, Associated Press College Player of the Year
- Billy Sims, Heisman Trophy
- Billy Sims, Sports Magazine's Player of the Year
- Billy Sims, United Press College Player of the Year
- Billy Sims, Walter Camp Foundation's Player of the Year
- Big 8 rushing champion: Sims
- NCAA DI scoring champion: Sims
- NCAA team rushing leaders
- NCAA team scoring leaders

== NFL draft ==
The following players were drafted into the National Football League following the season.

Round	Pick	Player	Position	NFL team
2	33	Greg Roberts	Guard	Tampa Bay Buccaneers
2	38	Reggie Mathis	Linebacker	New Orleans Saints
2	47	Sam Claphan	Tackle	Cleveland Browns
3	72	Kenny King	Running back	Houston Oilers
4	90	Phil Tabor	Defensive end	New York Giants
5	122	Victor Hicks	Tight end	Los Angeles Rams
6	143	Daryl Hunt	Linebacker	Houston Oilers
6	144	Thomas Lott	Running back	St. Louis Cardinals
7	189	Uwe von Schamann	Kicker	Miami Dolphins
12	284	Reggie Kinlaw	Defensive tackle	Oakland Raiders
