= 1978 Kansas Jayhawks football team =

American college football season

1978 Kansas Jayhawks football
- Conference: Big Eight Conference
- Record: 1–10 (0–7 Big 8)
- Head coach: Bud Moore (4th season)
- Offensive coordinator: John Levra (4th season)
- Defensive coordinator: Larry Jones (2nd season)
- Home stadium: Memorial Stadium

1978 Big Eight Conference football standings
	Conf.					Overall
Team	W		L		T	W		L		T
No. 3 Oklahoma +	6	–	1	–	0	11	–	1	–	0
No. 8 Nebraska +	6	–	1	–	0	9	–	3	–	0
No. 15 Missouri	4	–	3	–	0	8	–	4	–	0
Iowa State	4	–	3	–	0	8	–	4	–	0
Kansas State	3	–	4	–	0	4	–	7	–	0
Oklahoma State	3	–	4	–	0	3	–	8	–	0
Colorado	2	–	5	–	0	6	–	5	–	0
Kansas	0	–	7	–	0	1	–	10	–	0
+ – Conference co-champions; Rankings from AP Poll

The 1978 Kansas Jayhawks football team represented the University of Kansas in the Big Eight Conference during the 1978 NCAA Division I-A football season. In their fourth and final season under head coach Bud Moore, the Jayhawks compiled a 1–10 record (0–7 against conference opponents), finished in last place in the conference, and were outscored by opponents by a combined total of 346 to 172. They played their home games at Memorial Stadium in Lawrence, Kansas.

== Schedule ==
Date	Opponent	Site	Result	Attendance	Source
September 9	No. 16 Texas A&M*	Memorial Stadium; Lawrence, KS	L 10–37	30,698	
September 16	at No. 18 Washington*	Husky Stadium; Seattle, WA	L 2–31	49,450–49,624	
September 23	No. 8 UCLA*	Memorial Stadium; Lawrence, KS	W 28–24	35,362–43,120	
September 30	Miami (FL)*	Memorial Stadium; Lawrence, KS	L 6–38	36,372–47,420	
October 7	at No. 13 Colorado	Folsom Field; Boulder, CO	L 7–17	46,345–50,232	
October 14	No. 1 Oklahoma	Memorial Stadium; Lawrence, KS	L 16–17	40,450–44,450	
October 21	at Oklahoma State	Lewis Field; Stillwater, OK	L 7–21	35,336	
October 28	Iowa State^{†}	Memorial Stadium; Lawrence, KS	L 7–13	32,768	
November 4	No. 4 Nebraska	Memorial Stadium; Lawrence, KS (rivalry)	L 21–63	50,463	
November 11	at Missouri	Faurot Field; Columbia, MO (Border War)	L 0–48	64,453	
November 18	at Kansas State	KSU Stadium; Manhattan, KS (rivalry)	L 20–36	42,814	
*Non-conference game; ^{†}Homecoming; Rankings from AP Poll released prior to the game
