= 1978 Baylor Bears football team =

American college football season

1978 Baylor Bears football
- Conference: Southwest Conference
- Record: 3–8 (3–5 SWC)
- Head coach: Grant Teaff (7th season)
- Home stadium: Baylor Stadium

1978 Southwest Conference football standings
	Conf.					Overall
Team	W		L		T	W		L		T
No. 10 Houston $	7	–	1	–	0	9	–	3	–	0
No. 11 Arkansas	6	–	2	–	0	9	–	2	–	1
No. 9 Texas	6	–	2	–	0	9	–	3	–	0
Texas Tech	5	–	3	–	0	7	–	4	–	0
No. 19 Texas A&M	4	–	4	–	0	8	–	4	–	0
SMU	3	–	5	–	0	4	–	6	–	1
Baylor	3	–	5	–	0	3	–	8	–	0
Rice	2	–	6	–	0	2	–	9	–	0
TCU	0	–	8	–	0	2	–	9	–	0
$ – Conference champion; Rankings from AP Poll

The 1978 Baylor Bears football team represented the Baylor University in the 1978 NCAA Division I-A football season. The Bears finished the season sixth in the Southwest Conference. Sophomore Mike Singletary established a team record with 232 tackles in 1978, including 34 in a game against the University of Houston.

== Schedule ==
Date	Opponent	Site	Result	Attendance	Source
September 16	at Georgia*	Sanford Stadium; Athens, GA	L 14–16	43,000	
September 23	at Kentucky*	Commonwealth Stadium; Lexington, KY	L 21–25	57,793	
September 30	at No. 13 Ohio State*	Ohio Stadium; Columbus, OH	L 28–34	87,998	
October 7	Houston	Baylor Stadium; Waco, TX (rivalry)	L 18–20	35,000	
October 14	SMU	Baylor Stadium; Waco, TX	L 21–28	36,500	
October 21	at No. 12 Texas A&M	Kyle Field; College Station, TX (Battle of the Brazos)	W 24–6	55,458	
October 28	at TCU	Amon G. Carter Stadium; Fort Worth, TX (rivalry)	W 28–21	16,722	
November 4	at Texas Tech	Jones Stadium; Lubbock, TX (rivalry)	L 9–27	48,895	
November 11	No. 16 Arkansas^{†}	Baylor Stadium; Waco, TX	L 14–27	45,000	
November 18	at Rice	Rice Stadium; Houston, TX	L 10–24	13,000	
November 25	No. 9 Texas	Baylor Stadium; Waco, TX (rivalry)	W 38–14	31,500	
*Non-conference game; ^{†}Homecoming; Rankings from AP Poll released prior to the game

== Team Players drafted into the NFL ==
The following players were drafted into professional football following the season.

Player	Position	Round	Pick	Franchise
Greg Hawthorne	Running back	1	28	Pittsburgh Steelers
Ronnie Lee	Tackle	3	65	Miami Dolphins
Steve Howell	Fullback	4	107	Miami Dolphins
Luke Prestridge	Punter	7	188	Denver Broncos
