= 1978 Rice Owls football team =

American college football season

1978 Rice Owls football
- Conference: Southwest Conference
- Record: 2–9 (2–6 SWC)
- Head coach: Ray Alborn (1st season)
- Home stadium: Rice Stadium

1978 Southwest Conference football standings
	Conf.					Overall
Team	W		L		T	W		L		T
No. 10 Houston $	7	–	1	–	0	9	–	3	–	0
No. 11 Arkansas	6	–	2	–	0	9	–	2	–	1
No. 9 Texas	6	–	2	–	0	9	–	3	–	0
Texas Tech	5	–	3	–	0	7	–	4	–	0
No. 19 Texas A&M	4	–	4	–	0	8	–	4	–	0
SMU	3	–	5	–	0	4	–	6	–	1
Baylor	3	–	5	–	0	3	–	8	–	0
Rice	2	–	6	–	0	2	–	9	–	0
TCU	0	–	8	–	0	2	–	9	–	0
$ – Conference champion; Rankings from AP Poll

The 1978 Rice Owls football team was an American football team that represented Rice University in the Southwest Conference during the 1978 NCAA Division I-A football season. In their first year under head coach Ray Alborn, the team compiled a 2–9 record.

== Schedule ==
Date	Opponent	Site	Result	Attendance	Source
September 9	No. 20 Iowa State*	Rice Stadium; Houston, TX	L 19–23	17,500	
September 16	No. 7 Texas	Rice Stadium; Houston, TX (rivalry)	L 0–34	62,000	
September 23	at No. 3 Oklahoma*	Oklahoma Memorial Stadium; Norman, OK	L 7–66	71,774	
September 30	No. 11 LSU*	Rice Stadium; Houston, TX	L 7–37	50,000	
October 14	at TCU	Amon G. Carter Stadium; Fort Worth, TX	W 21–14	34,433	
October 21	Texas Tech	Rice Stadium; Houston, TX	L 28–42	20,000	
October 28	at Texas A&M	Kyle Field; College Station, TX	L 28–42	51,461	
November 4	at No. 17 Arkansas	Razorback Stadium; Fayetteville, AR	L 7–37	45,709	
November 11	SMU	Rice Stadium; Houston, TX (rivalry)	L 0–58	14,000	
November 18	Baylor	Rice Stadium; Houston, TX	W 24–10	13,000	
December 2	at No. 9 Houston	Houston Astrodome; Houston, TX (rivalry)	L 25–49	33,186	
*Non-conference game; Rankings from AP Poll released prior to the game
