= 1978 Arkansas Razorbacks football team =

American college football season

1978 Arkansas Razorbacks football

Fiesta Bowl, T 10–10 vs. UCLA
- Conference: Southwest Conference

Ranking
- Coaches: No. 10
- AP: No. 11
- Record: 9–2–1 (6–2 SWC)
- Head coach: Lou Holtz (2nd season)
- Defensive coordinator: Monte Kiffin (2nd season)
- Captains: Ron Calcagni; Ben Cowins; Larry Jackson; Jimmy Walker
- Home stadium: Razorback Stadium; War Memorial Stadium

1978 Southwest Conference football standings
	Conf.					Overall
Team	W		L		T	W		L		T
No. 10 Houston $	7	–	1	–	0	9	–	3	–	0
No. 11 Arkansas	6	–	2	–	0	9	–	2	–	1
No. 9 Texas	6	–	2	–	0	9	–	3	–	0
Texas Tech	5	–	3	–	0	7	–	4	–	0
No. 19 Texas A&M	4	–	4	–	0	8	–	4	–	0
SMU	3	–	5	–	0	4	–	6	–	1
Baylor	3	–	5	–	0	3	–	8	–	0
Rice	2	–	6	–	0	2	–	9	–	0
TCU	0	–	8	–	0	2	–	9	–	0
$ – Conference champion; Rankings from AP Poll

The 1978 Arkansas Razorbacks football team represented the University of Arkansas in the Southwest Conference (SWC) during the 1978 NCAA Division I-A football season. In their second year under head coach Lou Holtz, the Razorbacks compiled a 9–2–1 record (6–2 against SWC opponents), finished in a tie for second place in the SWC, and outscored their opponents by a combined total of 336 to 147. The Razorbacks' only losses were to SWC champion Houston by a 20–9 score and to Texas by a 28–21 score. The team advanced to 1978 Fiesta Bowl, playing to a 10–10 tie with UCLA. Arkansas was ranked No. 11 in the final AP poll and No. 10 in the final UPI Coaches Poll.

The team was described as having "tremendous talent at all skill positions" with a "swift" defense. The team was also described as being loaded at the wide receiver position.

== Schedule ==
Date	Opponent	Rank	Site	TV	Result	Attendance	Source
September 16	Vanderbilt*	No. 2	War Memorial Stadium; Little Rock, AR		W 48–17	55,718	
September 23	at Oklahoma State*	No. 2	Lewis Field; Stillwater, OK		W 19–7	49,500	
September 30	Tulsa*	No. 2	Razorback Stadium; Fayetteville, AR		W 21–13	45,428	
October 7	TCU	No. 4	War Memorial Stadium; Little Rock, AR		W 42–3	54,430	
October 21	at No. 8 Texas	No. 3	Texas Memorial Stadium; Austin, TX (rivalry)	ABC	L 21–28	78,000	
October 28	at No. 11 Houston	No. 9	Houston Astrodome; Houston, TX		L 9–20	50,913	
November 4	Rice	No. 17	Razorback Stadium; Fayetteville, AR		W 37–7	45,709	
November 11	at Baylor	No. 16	Baylor Stadium; Waco, TX		W 27–14	45,000	
November 18	No. 14 Texas A&M	No. 13	War Memorial Stadium; Little Rock, AR (rivalry)	ABC	W 26–7	54,118	
November 25	at SMU	No. 11	Cotton Bowl; Dallas, TX		W 27–14	43,301	
December 2	No. 16 Texas Tech	No. 8	Razorback Stadium; Fayetteville, AR (rivalry)		W 49–7	44,147	
December 25	vs. No. 15 UCLA*	No. 8	Sun Devil Stadium; Tempe, AZ (Fiesta Bowl)	NBC	T 10–10	55,202	
*Non-conference game; Rankings from AP Poll released prior to the game

== Roster ==
- QB Ron Calcagni, Sr.
- Dan Hampton
- QB Kevin Scanlon, Jr.
- G George Stewart
- WR TE Gene Ratliff
- P Bruce Lahay
