= Daryl Hunt =

American football player (1956–2010)

No. 50
- Position: Linebacker

Personal information
- Born: November 3, 1956; Odessa, Texas, U.S.
- Died: July 9, 2010 (aged 53); Houston, Texas, U.S
- Listed height: 6 ft 3 in (1.91 m)
- Listed weight: 229 lb (104 kg)

Career information
- High school: Permian (Odessa)
- College: Oklahoma
- NFL draft: 1979: 6th round, 143rd overall pick

Career history
- Houston Oilers (1979–1984)

Awards and highlights
- National champion (1975); 2× Second-team All-American (1977, 1978)

Career NFL statistics
- Sacks: 3.5
- Fumble recoveries: 2
- Stats at Pro Football Reference

Daryl Lynn Hunt (November 3, 1956 – July 9, 2010) was an American professional football player who was a linebacker for six seasons with the Houston Oilers of the National Football League (NFL). He played college football for the Oklahoma Sooners and was selected by the Houston in the sixth round of the 1979 NFL draft. He played in 78 career regular season games for the Oilers.

== Early life ==
Hunt was born in Odessa, Texas the son of educators Walter and Elayne Hunt. He was the first African-American to play football at Permian High School.

== College career ==
Hunt played linebacker and remains the OU career record-holder for tackles with 530. He had three of the best six single-season tackle totals (157 in 1978, 159 in 1977 and 177 in 1976). He earned all-Big Eight status three-times and was selected as a second-team All-American in 1977 and 1978.

== Professional career ==
Hunt was selected in the sixth round of the 1979 NFL draft by the Houston Oilers, and played 73 games from 1979 to 1983. He retired in 1984 due to a knee injury.

== Death ==
Hunt died at age 53 of a massive heart attack while jogging in Houston on July 9, 2010.
