= 1978 Houston Cougars football team =

American college football season

1978 Houston Cougars football
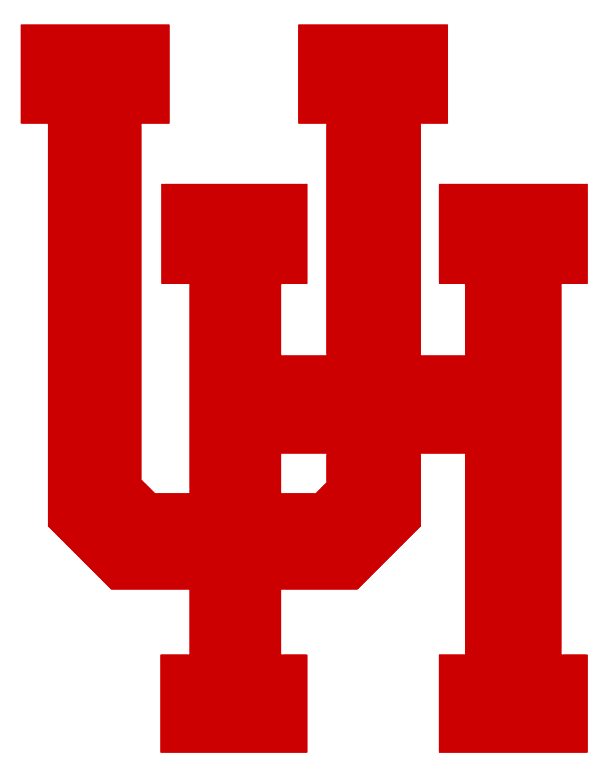

SWC champion

Cotton Bowl Classic, L 34–35 vs. Notre Dame
- Conference: Southwest Conference

Ranking
- Coaches: No. 11
- AP: No. 10
- Record: 9–3 (7–1 SWC)
- Head coach: Bill Yeoman (17th season)
- Offensive scheme: Houston Veer
- Defensive coordinator: Don Todd (7th season)
- Base defense: 5-2
- Captains: Danny Davis; David Hodge; Jim Wells
- Home stadium: Houston Astrodome

1978 Southwest Conference football standings
	Conf.					Overall
Team	W		L		T	W		L		T
No. 10 Houston $	7	–	1	–	0	9	–	3	–	0
No. 11 Arkansas	6	–	2	–	0	9	–	2	–	1
No. 9 Texas	6	–	2	–	0	9	–	3	–	0
Texas Tech	5	–	3	–	0	7	–	4	–	0
No. 19 Texas A&M	4	–	4	–	0	8	–	4	–	0
SMU	3	–	5	–	0	4	–	6	–	1
Baylor	3	–	5	–	0	3	–	8	–	0
Rice	2	–	6	–	0	2	–	9	–	0
TCU	0	–	8	–	0	2	–	9	–	0
$ – Conference champion; Rankings from AP Poll

The 1978 Houston Cougars football team, also known as the Houston Cougars, Houston, or UH, represented the University of Houston in the 1978 NCAA Division I-A football season. The Cougars were led by 17th-year head coach Bill Yeoman and played their home games at the Astrodome in Houston, Texas. The team competed as members of the Southwest Conference, winning the conference with a 7–1 conference record. This was Houston's first outright conference title and second overall, in only their third year in the league. They were invited to the 1979 Cotton Bowl Classic, played on New Year's Day, where they were defeated by Notre Dame. Houston was ranked 10th in the final AP Poll of the season and 11th in the Coaches' Poll.

== Schedule ==
Date	Opponent	Rank	Site	TV	Result	Attendance	Source
September 16	at Memphis State*		Liberty Bowl Memorial Stadium; Memphis, TN		L 3–17	31,316	
September 23	Utah*		Houston Astrodome; Houston, TX		W 42–25	30,000	
September 30	at No. 10 Florida State*		Doak Campbell Stadium; Tallahassee, FL		W 27–21	41,142	
October 7	at Baylor		Baylor Stadium; Waco, TX (rivalry)		W 20–18	35,000	
October 14	No. 6 Texas A&M	No. 17	Houston Astrodome; Houston, TX		W 33–0	52,156	
October 21	at SMU	No. 11	Cotton Bowl; Dallas, TX (rivalry)		W 42–28	64,871	
October 28	No. 9 Arkansas^{†}	No. 11	Houston Astrodome; Houston, TX		W 20–9	50,913	
November 4	TCU	No. 10	Houston Astrodome; Houston, TX		W 63–6	30,011	
November 11	at No. 6 Texas	No. 8	Texas Memorial Stadium; Austin, TX		W 10–7	83,053	
November 25	at Texas Tech	No. 5	Jones Stadium; Lubbock, TX (rivalry)		L 21–22	36,691	
December 2	Rice	No. 9	Houston Astrodome; Houston, TX (rivalry)		W 49–25	33,186	
January 1	vs. No. 10 Notre Dame*	No. 9	Cotton Bowl; Dallas, TX (Cotton Bowl Classic)	CBS	L 34–35	72,000	
*Non-conference game; ^{†}Homecoming; Rankings from AP Poll released prior to the game
