= 1978 Hall of Fame Classic =

Iowa State Cyclones	Texas A&M Aggies
(8–3)	(7–4)
12	28
Head coach: Earle Bruce	Head coach: Tom Wilson
AP / Coaches; 19 / NR
	1	2	3	4	Total
Iowa State	0	6	6	0	12
Texas A&M	0	14	0	14	28
- Date: December 20, 1978
- Season: 1978
- Stadium: Legion Field
- Location: Birmingham, Alabama
- MVP: RB Curtis Dickey (Texas A&M)
- Attendance: 41,158

United States TV coverage
- Network: Mizlou Television Network
- Announcers: Lindsey Nelson, Don Perkins and Howard David

The 1978 Hall of Fame Classic was a college football postseason bowl game that featured the Texas A&M Aggies and the Iowa State Cyclones.

== Background ==
The Cyclones had finished 8–3 for the third straight year, going from being tied for 4th to 2nd to 3rd, respectively. This was their fourth bowl game of the decade. Emory Bellard had resigned as Aggie head coach after a 4–0 start led to two straight losses in Southwest Conference play. Tom Wilson led the Aggies to a 3–2 record down the stretch to get A&M to their fourth straight bowl season.

== Game summary ==
Curtis Dickey ran for 278 yards on 34 carries while scoring a touchdown.

Second Quarter

- Iowa State: Green 5 pass from Grant (kick failed)
- Texas A&M: Brothers 1 run (Franklin kick)
- Texas A&M: Carter 4 pass from Mosley (Franklin kick)

Third Quarter

- Iowa State: Green 28 run (pass failed)

Fourth Quarter

- Texas A&M: Dickey 19 run (Franklin kick)
- Texas A&M: Armstrong 5 run (Franklin kick)

== Aftermath ==
Bruce left for his alma mater Ohio State after the game, and the Cyclones would wait 22 years until their next bowl appearance. Texas A&M did not wait as long for their next bowl appearance, going to the Independence Bowl in 1981.
