= 1978 TCU Horned Frogs football team =

American college football season

1978 TCU Horned Frogs football
- Conference: Southwest Conference
- Record: 2–9 (0–8 SWC)
- Head coach: F. A. Dry (2nd season)
- Offensive scheme: Pro-style
- Defensive coordinator: Bob Junko (3rd season)
- Base defense: 4–3
- Home stadium: Amon G. Carter Stadium

1978 Southwest Conference football standings
	Conf.					Overall
Team	W		L		T	W		L		T
No. 10 Houston $	7	–	1	–	0	9	–	3	–	0
No. 11 Arkansas	6	–	2	–	0	9	–	2	–	1
No. 9 Texas	6	–	2	–	0	9	–	3	–	0
Texas Tech	5	–	3	–	0	7	–	4	–	0
No. 19 Texas A&M	4	–	4	–	0	8	–	4	–	0
SMU	3	–	5	–	0	4	–	6	–	1
Baylor	3	–	5	–	0	3	–	8	–	0
Rice	2	–	6	–	0	2	–	9	–	0
TCU	0	–	8	–	0	2	–	9	–	0
$ – Conference champion; Rankings from AP Poll

The 1978 TCU Horned Frogs football team represented Texas Christian University (TCU) in the 1978 NCAA Division I-A football season. The Horned Frogs finished the season 2–9 overall and 0–8 in the Southwest Conference. The team was coached by F. A. Dry, in his second year as head coach. The Frogs played their home games in Amon G. Carter Stadium, which is located on campus in Fort Worth, Texas.

== Schedule ==
Date	Opponent	Site	Result	Attendance	Source
September 9	at SMU	Cotton Bowl; Dallas, TX (rivalry)	L 14–45	41,112	
September 23	at Oregon*	Autzen Stadium; Eugene, OR	W 14–10	30,500	
September 30	at No. 5 Penn State*	Beaver Stadium; University Park, PA	L 0–58	76,832	
October 7	at No. 4 Arkansas	War Memorial Stadium; Little Rock, AR	L 3–42	54,430	
October 14	Rice	Amon G. Carter Stadium; Fort Worth, TX	L 14–21	34,433	
October 21	at Tulane*	Louisiana Superdome; New Orleans, LA	W 13–7	22,748	
October 28	Baylor	Amon G. Carter Stadium; Fort Worth, TX (rivalry)	L 21–28	16,722	
November 4	at No. 10 Houston	Houston Astrodome; Houston, TX	L 6–63	30,011	
November 11	Texas Tech	Amon G. Carter Stadium; Fort Worth, TX (rivalry)	L 17–27	17,228	
November 18	No. 9 Texas	Amon G. Carter Stadium; Fort Worth, TX (rivalry)	L 0–41	20,014	
November 25	at Texas A&M	Kyle Field; College Station, TX (rivalry)	L 7–15	41,484	
*Non-conference game; Rankings from AP Poll released prior to the game

== Roster ==
1978 TCU Horned Frogs football team roster
Players			Coaches
Offense: Pos. / # / Name / Class; RB / 6 / Jimmy Allen	Defense: Pos. / # / Name / Class; DT / 79 / Marshall Harris / Sr	Special teams: Pos. / # / Name / Class	Head coach: F. A. Dry; Coordinators/assistant coaches Legend: (C) Team captain; (S) Suspended; (I) Ineligible; Injured; Redshirt
