= 1978 Iowa State Cyclones football team =

American college football season

1978 Iowa State Cyclones football

Hall of Fame Classic, L 12–28 vs. Texas A&M
- Conference: Big Eight Conference
- Record: 8–4 (4–3 Big 8)
- Head coach: Earle Bruce (6th season)
- Defensive coordinator: Pete Rodriguez (3rd season)
- Home stadium: Cylcone Stadium

1978 Big Eight Conference football standings
	Conf.					Overall
Team	W		L		T	W		L		T
No. 3 Oklahoma +	6	–	1	–	0	11	–	1	–	0
No. 8 Nebraska +	6	–	1	–	0	9	–	3	–	0
No. 15 Missouri	4	–	3	–	0	8	–	4	–	0
Iowa State	4	–	3	–	0	8	–	4	–	0
Kansas State	3	–	4	–	0	4	–	7	–	0
Oklahoma State	3	–	4	–	0	3	–	8	–	0
Colorado	2	–	5	–	0	6	–	5	–	0
Kansas	0	–	7	–	0	1	–	10	–	0
+ – Conference co-champions; Rankings from AP Poll

The 1978 Iowa State Cyclones football team represented the Iowa State University during the 1978 NCAA Division I-A football season as a member of the Big Eight Conference (Big 8). The team was led by head coach Earle Bruce, in his sixth year, and they played their home games at Cylcone Stadium in Ames, Iowa. They finished the season with a record of eight wins and four losses (8–4, 4–3 Big 8) and with a loss to Texas A&M in the All-American Bowl. Iowa State's secondary coach was Pete Carroll.

== Schedule ==
Date	Time	Opponent	Rank	Site	TV	Result	Attendance	Source
September 9	7:30 pm	at Rice*	No. 20	Rice Stadium; Houston, TX		W 23–19	17,500	
September 16	1:30 pm	San Diego State*	No. 19	Cylcone Stadium; Ames, IA		W 14–13	46,450	
September 23	1:05 pm	at Iowa*	No. 20	Kinnick Stadium; Iowa City, IA (rivalry)	WHO (delay)	W 31–0	60,075	
September 30	1:30 pm	Drake*	No. 17	Cyclone Stadium; Ames, IA		W 35–7	48,750	
October 7	1:30 pm	No. 10 Nebraska	No. 15	Cyclone Stadium; Ames, IA (rivalry)		L 0–23	51,450	
October 14	1:30 pm	at No. 19 Missouri	No. 20	Faurot Field; Columbia, MO (rivalry)		L 13–26	63,106	
October 21	1:30 pm	No. 1 Oklahoma		Cyclone Stadium; Ames, IA	WOI (delay)	L 6–34	49,400	
October 28	1:30 pm	at Kansas		Memorial Stadium; Lawrence, KS		W 13–7	32,768	
November 4	1:30 pm	Kansas State^{†}		Cyclone Stadium; Ames, IA (rivalry)		W 24–0	47,450	
November 11	1:30 pm	at Oklahoma State		Lewis Field; Stillwater, OK		W 28–15	40,300	
November 18	11:50 am	at Colorado		Folsom Field; Boulder, CO	ABC	W 20–16	46,321	
December 20	7:00 pm	vs. Texas A&M*	No. 19	Legion Field; Birmingham, AL (Hall of Fame Classic)	MTN	L 12–28	41,158	
*Non-conference game; ^{†}Homecoming; Rankings from AP Poll released prior to the game; All times are in Central time

== Roster ==
1978 Iowa State Cyclones football team roster
Players
Coaches
Offense

Pos.	#	Name	Class
RB	24	Dexter Green	Sr

Defense

Pos.	#	Name	Class
DT	62	Kenny Neil	So
DL	63	Mike Stensrud	Sr

Special teams

Pos.	#	Name	Class

Head coach

- Earle Bruce

Coordinators/assistant coaches

- Jim Williams – Offensive line
- Pete Carroll – Secondary coordinator

Legend

- (C) Team captain
- (S) Suspended
- (I) Ineligible
- Injured
- Redshirt

== Team players in the 1979 NFL draft ==
Player	Position	Round	Pick	NFL club
Mike Stensrud	Defensive line	2	31	Houston Oilers
