= 1978 Texas Tech Red Raiders football team =

American college football season

1978 Texas Tech Red Raiders football
- Conference: Southwest Conference
- Record: 7–4 (5–3 SWC)
- Head coach: Rex Dockery (1st season)
- Offensive scheme: Option
- Defensive coordinator: Sam Robertson (1st season)
- Base defense: 4–4
- Home stadium: Jones Stadium

1978 Southwest Conference football standings
	Conf.					Overall
Team	W		L		T	W		L		T
No. 10 Houston $	7	–	1	–	0	9	–	3	–	0
No. 11 Arkansas	6	–	2	–	0	9	–	2	–	1
No. 9 Texas	6	–	2	–	0	9	–	3	–	0
Texas Tech	5	–	3	–	0	7	–	4	–	0
No. 19 Texas A&M	4	–	4	–	0	8	–	4	–	0
SMU	3	–	5	–	0	4	–	6	–	1
Baylor	3	–	5	–	0	3	–	8	–	0
Rice	2	–	6	–	0	2	–	9	–	0
TCU	0	–	8	–	0	2	–	9	–	0
$ – Conference champion; Rankings from AP Poll

The 1978 Texas Tech Red Raiders football team represented Texas Tech University as a member of the Southwest Conference (SWC) during the 1978 NCAA Division I-A football season. In their first season under head coach Rex Dockery, the Red Raiders compiled a 7–4 record (5–3 against SWC opponents), were outscored by a combined total of 268 to 246, and finished in fourth place in the conference. The team played its home games at Clifford B. and Audrey Jones Stadium in Lubbock, Texas.

== Schedule ==
Date	Opponent	Site	Result	Attendance	Source
September 9	at No. 9 USC*	Los Angeles Memorial Coliseum; Los Angeles, CA	L 9–17	50,321	
September 23	Arizona*	Jones Stadium; Lubbock, TX	W 41–26	41,732	
September 30	No. 6 Texas	Jones Stadium; Lubbock, TX (rivalry)	L 7–24	54,012	
October 7	at No. 7 Texas A&M	Kyle Field; College Station, TX (rivalry)	L 9–38	56,121	
October 14	at New Mexico*	University Stadium; Albuquerque, NM	W 36–23	23,167	
October 21	at Rice	Rice Stadium; Houston, TX	W 42–28	20,000	
November 4	Baylor^{†}	Jones Stadium; Lubbock, TX (rivalry)	W 27–9	48,895	
November 11	at TCU	Amon G. Carter Stadium; Fort Worth, TX (rivalry)	W 27–17	17,228	
November 18	No. 18 SMU	Jones Stadium; Lubbock, TX	W 19–16	45,101	
November 25	No. 5 Houston	Jones Stadium; Lubbock, TX (rivalry)	W 22–21	36,691	
December 2	at No. 8 Arkansas	Razorback Stadium; Fayetteville, AR (rivalry)	L 7–49	43,301	
*Non-conference game; ^{†}Homecoming; Rankings from AP Poll released prior to the game

== Roster ==
1978 Texas Tech Red Raiders football team roster
Players
Coaches
Offense

Pos.	#	Name	Class
TE	86	James Hadnot	Jr
WR	87	Brian Nelson	Sr
QB	12	Ron Reeves	Fr

Defense

Pos.	#	Name	Class
SS	24	Larry Flowers	Jr
CB	25	Tate Randle	Fr
S	21	Ted Watts	So

Special teams

Pos.	#	Name	Class

Head coach

- Rex Dockery

Coordinators/assistant coaches

Legend

- (C) Team captain
- (S) Suspended
- (I) Ineligible
- Injured
- Redshirt
