= 1978 Texas Longhorns football team =

American college football season

1978 Texas Longhorns football

Sun Bowl champion

Sun Bowl, W 42–0 vs. Maryland
- Conference: Southwest Conference

Ranking
- Coaches: No. 9
- AP: No. 9
- Record: 9–3 (6–2 SWC)
- Head coach: Fred Akers (2nd season)
- Offensive coordinator: Leon Manley (2nd season)
- Defensive coordinator: Leon Fuller (2nd season)
- Home stadium: Texas Memorial Stadium

1978 Southwest Conference football standings
	Conf.					Overall
Team	W		L		T	W		L		T
No. 10 Houston $	7	–	1	–	0	9	–	3	–	0
No. 11 Arkansas	6	–	2	–	0	9	–	2	–	1
No. 9 Texas	6	–	2	–	0	9	–	3	–	0
Texas Tech	5	–	3	–	0	7	–	4	–	0
No. 19 Texas A&M	4	–	4	–	0	8	–	4	–	0
SMU	3	–	5	–	0	4	–	6	–	1
Baylor	3	–	5	–	0	3	–	8	–	0
Rice	2	–	6	–	0	2	–	9	–	0
TCU	0	–	8	–	0	2	–	9	–	0
$ – Conference champion; Rankings from AP Poll

The 1978 Texas Longhorns football team represented the University of Texas at Austin in the 1978 NCAA Division I-A football season. The Longhorns finished the regular season with an 8-3 record and defeated Maryland in the Sun Bowl.

== Schedule ==
Date	Time	Opponent	Rank	Site	TV	Result	Attendance	Source
September 16	7:30 p.m.	at Rice	No. 7	Rice Stadium; Houston, TX (rivalry)		W 34–0	62,000	
September 23	7:00 p.m.	Wyoming*	No. 6	Texas Memorial Stadium; Austin, TX		W 17–3	60,000	
September 30	7:30 p.m.	at Texas Tech	No. 6	Jones Stadium; Lubbock, TX (rivalry)		W 24–7	54,012	
October 7	11:50 a.m.	vs. No. 1 Oklahoma*	No. 6	Cotton Bowl; Dallas, TX (Red River Shootout)	ABC	L 10–31	72,032	
October 14	7:00 p.m.	North Texas State*	No. 12	Texas Memorial Stadium; Austin, TX		W 26–16	63,000	
October 21	11:50 a.m.	No. 3 Arkansas	No. 8	Texas Memorial Stadium; Austin, TX (rivalry)	ABC	W 28–21	78,000	
October 28	2:00 p.m.	SMU	No. 7	Texas Memorial Stadium; Austin, TX		W 22–3	65,289	
November 11	2:15 p.m.	No. 8 Houston	No. 6	Texas Memorial Stadium; Austin, TX		L 7–10	83,053	
November 18	2:00 p.m.	at TCU	No. 9	Amon G. Carter Stadium; Fort Worth, TX (rivalry)		W 41–0	20,014	
November 25	2:00 p.m.	at Baylor	No. 9	Baylor Stadium; Waco, TX (rivalry)	ABC	L 14–38	31,500	
December 1	8:00 p.m.	Texas A&M	No. 14	Texas Memorial Stadium; Austin, TX (rivalry)	ABC	W 22–7	78,413	
December 23	12:30 p.m.	vs. No. 13 Maryland*	No. 14	Sun Bowl; El Paso, TX (Sun Bowl)	CBS	W 42–0	33,122	
*Non-conference game; Rankings from AP Poll released prior to the game; All times are in Central time

== Game summaries ==
=== North Texas State ===
North Texas State at Texas

Team	1	2	3	4	Total
Mean Green	7	2	7	0	16
• No. 12 Longhorns	0	16	7	3	26

- Date: October 14
- Location: Texas Memorial Stadium, Austin, Texas
- Game start: 7:01 pm CDT
- Elapsed time: 2:33
- Game attendance: 63,000
- Game weather: 71 °F (22 °C), Clear, Wind N 5 mph (8.0 km/h)

Scoring summary
1	6:13	UNT	Murray 38-yard pass from Case (Hamm kick)	UNT 7–0
2	13:32	UNT	Safety (Erxleben fumbled out of end zone)	UNT 9–0
2	1:48	TEX	Jam Jones 1-yard run (Erxleben kick)	UNT 9–7
2	1:06	TEX	Safety (Snap out of end zone)	Tied 9–9
2	0:17	TEX	Lam Jones 41-yard pass from McEachern (Erxleben kick)	Texas 16–9
3	8:31	TEX	Studdard 13-yard pass from McEachern (Erxleben kick)	Texas 23–9
3	3:10	UNT	Jackson 2-yard run (Hamm kick)	Texas 23–16
4	2:37	TEX	Erxleben 47-yard field goal	Texas 26–16

== Roster ==
1978 Texas Longhorns football team roster
Players
Coaches
Offense

Pos.	#	Name	Class
QB	6	Randy McEachern	Sr

Defense

Pos.	#	Name	Class
DT	53	Bill Acker	Jr
DB		Glenn Blackwood	Sr
DT	99	Steve McMichael	Jr

Special teams

Pos.	#	Name	Class
K	15	Russell Erxleben	Sr

Head coach

- Fred Akers

Coordinators/assistant coaches

Legend

- (C) Team captain
- (S) Suspended
- (I) Ineligible
- Injured
- Redshirt

== 1978 team players in the NFL ==
The following players were selected in the 1979 NFL draft football following the season.

Player	Position	Round	Pick	Franchise
Russell Erxleben	Kicker/Punter	1	11	New Orleans Saints
Glenn Blackwood	Defensive back	8	215	Miami Dolphins
