= 1978 SMU Mustangs football team =

American college football season

1978 SMU Mustangs football
- Conference: Southwest Conference
- Record: 4–6–1 (3–5 SWC)
- Head coach: Ron Meyer (3rd season)
- Offensive scheme: Wishbone
- Defensive coordinator: Steve Sidwell (3rd season)
- Base defense: 3–4
- Home stadium: Cotton Bowl

1978 Southwest Conference football standings
	Conf.					Overall
Team	W		L		T	W		L		T
No. 10 Houston $	7	–	1	–	0	9	–	3	–	0
No. 11 Arkansas	6	–	2	–	0	9	–	2	–	1
No. 9 Texas	6	–	2	–	0	9	–	3	–	0
Texas Tech	5	–	3	–	0	7	–	4	–	0
No. 19 Texas A&M	4	–	4	–	0	8	–	4	–	0
SMU	3	–	5	–	0	4	–	6	–	1
Baylor	3	–	5	–	0	3	–	8	–	0
Rice	2	–	6	–	0	2	–	9	–	0
TCU	0	–	8	–	0	2	–	9	–	0
$ – Conference champion; Rankings from AP Poll

The 1978 SMU Mustangs football team represented Southern Methodist University (SMU) as a member of the Southwest Conference (SWC) during the 1978 NCAA Division I-A football season. Led by third-year head coach Ron Meyer, the Mustangs compiled an overall record 4–6–1 with a mark of 3–5 in conference play, tying for sixth place in the SWC.

With sagging attendance in recent years, including a dismal 6,918 against conference foe Rice, SMU athletic director Russ Potts orchestrated "Mustang Mania." Potts wanted to make SMU more visible in the Dallas area. Average attendance at SMU home games jumped from 25,644 in the previous year to 51,960 in the 1978 season. This was the highest average attendance for SMU home games since 1950.

== Schedule ==
Date	Opponent	Site	Result	Attendance	Source
September 9	TCU	Cotton Bowl; Dallas, TX (rivalry)	W 45–14	41,112	
September 16	vs. Florida*	Orlando Stadium; Orlando, FL	W 35–25	34,101	
September 23	at No. 3 Penn State*	Beaver Stadium; University Park, PA	L 21–26	77,404	
October 7	at No. 14 Ohio State*	Ohio Stadium; Columbus, OH	T 35–35	87,712	
October 14	at Baylor	Baylor Stadium; Waco, TX	W 28–21	36,500	
October 21	No. 11 Houston	Cotton Bowl; Dallas, TX (rivalry)	L 28–42	64,871	
October 28	at No. 7 Texas	Texas Memorial Stadium; Austin, TX	L 3–22	65,289	
November 4	Texas A&M	Cotton Bowl; Dallas, TX	L 17–20	57,208	
November 11	at Rice	Rice Stadium; Houston, TX (rivalry)	W 58–0	14,000	
November 18	at Texas Tech	Jones Stadium; Lubbock, TX	L 16–19	45,101	
November 25	Arkansas	Cotton Bowl; Dallas, TX	L 14–27	44,647	
*Non-conference game; Rankings from AP Poll released prior to the game

== Roster ==
1978 SMU Mustangs football team roster
Players
Coaches
Offense

Pos.	#	Name	Class
TE	87	Bob Fisher	Jr
QB	10	Mike Ford	So
OL	77	Perry Hartnett	Fr
OL	71	Mike Jusko	So
OL	67	Mike Mason	So
OL	76	Lee Spivey	So
QB	12	Jim Bob Taylor	Fr
RB	33	Walt Foster	Sr
WR	21	Emanuel Tolbert	Jr

Defense

Pos.	#	Name	Class
DB	27	Charles Bruton	So
DL	99	Eric Ferguson	Fr
DB	9	Mark Gibson	So
DL	80	Byron Hunt	So
DL	61	Charles Hunt	Jr
DB	20	James Mobley	Fr
DT	96	Dane Rasmussen	Sr
CB	34	John Simmons	So
DB	16	Gordon Youngblood	Fr

Special teams

Pos.	#	Name	Class
P	1	Ken Rosenthal	Jr

Head coach

- Ron Meyer

Coordinators/assistant coaches

Legend

- (C) Team captain
- (S) Suspended
- (I) Ineligible
- Injured
- Redshirt

== Team players in the NFL ==
Player	Position	Round	Pick	NFL club
D. K. Perry	Defensive back	8	200	New York Giants
