= Tom Sorley =

American football player

Tom K. Sorley of Big Spring, Texas is a former Nebraska Cornhuskers quarterback. An All-State quarterback at Big Spring High School, Sorley quarterbacked the Huskers to a 27-9-1 record and wins in two bowl games.

== College career ==
Sorley began his college career in 1974 at the University of Nebraska–Lincoln during the tenure of head coach Tom Osborne. As quarterback Sorley was team captain and completed 57.2 percent of his passes (148-256) from 1976–1978, which is ninth on the Nebraska's all-time completion percentage list. Sorley holds seventh for Nebraska single-season passing yards (1,571) in 1978, and is thirteenth for NU career passing yards (2,230) during 1976-78. He quarterbacked the Huskers to a 27-9-1 record and wins in two bowl games. He graduated from the University of Nebraska–Lincoln with a degree in Business in 1979.

=== 1978 statistics ===
Passing: 174 attempts, 102 completions, 7 interceptions (.584) for 1,571 yards, 7 TDs.

NU Top NCAA Pass Rating (min. 15 att.):

9. Rating: 212.0, Tom Sorley, QB, vs. Kansas St., Oct. 14, 1978 (16-11-1/218/2)

=== Bowl games ===
Sorley led Nebraska to a 17-14 upset of the #1 ranked Oklahoma Sooners during the 1978 regular season. Following a shocking loss to Missouri the following week, the Cornhuskers were paired in a rare season rematch in the January 1, 1979 Orange Bowl game. Nebraska jumped out to a 7-0 lead on 21-yard pass from Sorley to split end Tim Smith, but lost 31-24.

Sorley played in the 21-10 Nebraska victory over North Carolina in the 1977 Liberty Bowl and the 1979 Olympia Challenge Bowl in Seattle, Washington which paired a group of Big 8 all-stars against their Pac-10 counterparts.

=== Honors ===
Sorley is a 1977 Academic All-American, a 1978 Academic All Big 8 First Team, a 1987 Academic All-Big 8 Conference selection and 1977 and 1978 AP All Big 8 quarterback Honorable Mention, and 1987 Cornhusker team captain. He was named ABC-TV Player of the game and Nebraska Player of the Week against 1977 Oklahoma State and against 1978 Hawaii.

== Post-football career and life ==
Sorley is the former President/CEO of Rosendin Electric, Inc., located in San Jose, CA, the largest independent electrical contractor in the U.S. and the third largest electrical contractor overall. Active in industry affairs, Sorley serves on several joint IBEW/NECA committees and serves on the Board for the SF Bay Area Boy Scouts of America, National Board for the Design Build Institute of America, and the National Board for Building Futures Council.
