= 1978 Texas A&M Aggies football team =

American college football season

1978 Texas A&M Aggies football

Hall of Fame Classic, W 28–12 vs. Iowa State
- Conference: Southwest Conference

Ranking
- Coaches: No. 18
- AP: No. 19
- Record: 8–4 (4–4 SWC)
- Head coach: Emory Bellard (7th season; first 6 games); Tom Wilson (interim, final 6 games)
- Offensive coordinator: Tom Wilson (4th season)
- Offensive scheme: Wishbone
- Defensive coordinator: Melvin Robertson (7th season)
- Home stadium: Kyle Field

1978 Southwest Conference football standings
	Conf.					Overall
Team	W		L		T	W		L		T
No. 10 Houston $	7	–	1	–	0	9	–	3	–	0
No. 11 Arkansas	6	–	2	–	0	9	–	2	–	1
No. 9 Texas	6	–	2	–	0	9	–	3	–	0
Texas Tech	5	–	3	–	0	7	–	4	–	0
No. 19 Texas A&M	4	–	4	–	0	8	–	4	–	0
SMU	3	–	5	–	0	4	–	6	–	1
Baylor	3	–	5	–	0	3	–	8	–	0
Rice	2	–	6	–	0	2	–	9	–	0
TCU	0	–	8	–	0	2	–	9	–	0
$ – Conference champion; Rankings from AP Poll

The 1978 Texas A&M Aggies football team represented Texas A&M University in the 1978 NCAA Division I-A football season as a member of the Southwest Conference (SWC). The Aggies were led by head coach Emory Bellard in his seventh season through the first six games before his resignation on October 24. Tom Wilson was named interim coach and led the Aggies in their final six games. and finished with a record of eight wins and four losses (8–4 overall, 4–4 in the SWC) and with a victory in the Hall of Fame Classic.

== Schedule ==
Date	Opponent	Rank	Site	Result	Attendance	Source
September 9	at Kansas*	No. 16	Memorial Stadium; Lawrence, KS	W 37–10	30,698	
September 23	at Boston College*	No. 9	Alumni Stadium; Chestnut Hill, MA	W 37–2	26,012	
September 30	Memphis State*	No. 8	Kyle Field; College Station, TX	W 58–0	56,818	
October 7	Texas Tech	No. 7	Kyle Field; College Station, TX (rivalry)	W 38–9	56,121	
October 14	at No. 17 Houston	No. 6	Houston Astrodome; Houston, TX	L 0–33	52,156	
October 21	Baylor	No. 12	Kyle Field; College Station, TX (Battle of the Brazos)	L 6–24	55,458	
October 28	Rice		Kyle Field; College Station, TX	W 38–21	51,461	
November 4	at SMU		Cotton Bowl; Dallas, TX	W 20–17	57,208	
November 18	at No. 13 Arkansas		War Memorial Stadium; Little Rock, AR (rivalry)	L 7–26	54,118	
November 25	TCU		Kyle Field; College Station, TX (rivalry)	W 15–7	41,484	
December 2	at No. 14 Texas		Texas Memorial Stadium; Austin, TX (rivalry)	L 7–22	78,413	
December 20	vs. No. 19 Iowa State*		Legion Field; Birmingham, AL (Hall of Fame Classic)	W 28–12	41,158	
*Non-conference game; Rankings from AP Poll released prior to the game

== Roster ==
1978 Texas A&M Aggies football team roster
Players
Coaches
Offense

Pos.	#	Name	Class
RB		Curtis Dickey	Jr
OT		Cody Risien	Sr
TE		Russ Mikeska	Sr
FB		Adger Armstrong	Sr
WR		Gerald Carter	Jr

Defense

Pos.	#	Name	Class
DL		Gene Sanders	Sr
DE		Jacob Green	Jr

Special teams

Pos.	#	Name	Class
K		Tony Franklin	Sr

Head coach

- Emory Bellard

Coordinators/assistant coaches

- Tom Wilson – Offensive coordinator/quarterbacks
- Donnie Wigginton – Offensive backs
- Chuck Moser – Wide receivers
- Dan LaGrasta – Offensive line
- Bob Stanley – Assistant offensive line
- Melvin Robertson – Defensive coordinator/assistant head coach
- Paul Register – Defensive line
- R. C. Slocum – Linebackers

Legend

- (C) Team captain
- (S) Suspended
- (I) Ineligible
- Injured
- Redshirt
