= 1978 Kansas State Wildcats football team =

American college football season

1978 Kansas State Wildcats football
- Conference: Big Eight Conference
- Record: 4–7 (3–4 Big 8)
- Head coach: Jim Dickey (1st season)
- Defensive coordinator: Gary Darnell (1st season)
- Home stadium: KSU Stadium

1978 Big Eight Conference football standings
	Conf.					Overall
Team	W		L		T	W		L		T
No. 3 Oklahoma +	6	–	1	–	0	11	–	1	–	0
No. 8 Nebraska +	6	–	1	–	0	9	–	3	–	0
No. 15 Missouri	4	–	3	–	0	8	–	4	–	0
Iowa State	4	–	3	–	0	8	–	4	–	0
Kansas State	3	–	4	–	0	4	–	7	–	0
Oklahoma State	3	–	4	–	0	3	–	8	–	0
Colorado	2	–	5	–	0	6	–	5	–	0
Kansas	0	–	7	–	0	1	–	10	–	0
+ – Conference co-champions; Rankings from AP Poll

The 1978 Kansas State Wildcats football team represented Kansas State University in the 1978 NCAA Division I-A football season. The team's head football coach was Jim Dickey. 1978 was the first year at Kansas State for Dickey. The Wildcats played their home games in KSU Stadium.

== Schedule ==
Date	Opponent	Site	Result	Attendance	Source
September 9	at Arizona*	Arizona Stadium; Tucson, AZ	L 0–31	50,484	
September 16	Auburn*	KSU Stadium; Manhattan, KS	L 32–45	27,620	
September 23	at Tulsa*	Skelly Field; Tulsa, OK	L 14–24	22,000	
September 30	Air Force*	KSU Stadium; Manhattan, KS	W 34–21	30,300	
October 7	Oklahoma State	KSU Stadium; Manhattan, KS	W 18–7	21,900	
October 14	at No. 8 Nebraska	Memorial Stadium; Lincoln, NE (rivalry)	L 14–48	75,818	
October 21	No. 13 Missouri^{†}	KSU Stadium; Manhattan, KS	L 14–56	24,500	
October 28	at No. 1 Oklahoma	Oklahoma Memorial Stadium; Norman, OK	L 19–56	72,105	
November 4	at Iowa State	Cyclone Stadium; Ames, IA (rivalry)	L 0–24	47,450	
November 11	Colorado	KSU Stadium; Manhattan, KS (rivalry)	W 20–10	13,100	
November 18	Kansas	KSU Stadium; Manhattan, KS (rivalry)	W 36–20	42,814	
*Non-conference game; ^{†}Homecoming; Rankings from AP Poll released prior to the game

== Game summaries ==
=== Nebraska ===
Team	1	2	3	4	Total
• No. 8 Nebraska	0	14	21	13	48
Kansas State	0	7	0	7	14

- Date: 1978-10-14
- Location: Memorial Stadium, Lincoln, Nebraska
- Game attendance: 75,818

Kansas State made an effort to be competitive for a bit, but Nebraska kept going after obtaining a 14-7 halftime lead. The Wildcats were trailing by 28 before they put up their final 4th-quarter touchdown, which the Cornhuskers further marginalized with 13 additional points while posting their second consecutive 600+ yard game.

=== Oklahoma ===
Team	1	2	3	4	Total
Kansas St	0	7	12	0	19
• Oklahoma	21	14	0	21	56

- Date: October 28
- Location: Oklahoma Memorial Stadium
- Game attendance: 72,105
