= 1980 Liberty Bowl =

American college football game

- 22nd Liberty Bowl
Purdue Boilermakers	Missouri Tigers
(8–3)	(8–3)
Big Ten	Big Eight
28	25
Head coach: Jim Young	Head coach: Warren Powers
	1	2	3	4	Total
Purdue	7	14	7	0	28
Missouri	0	12	3	10	25
- Date: December 27, 1980
- Season: 1980
- Stadium: Liberty Bowl Memorial Stadium
- Location: Memphis, Tennessee
- MVP: QB Mark Herrmann (Purdue)
- Referee: R. Pete Williams (SEC)
- Attendance: 53,667

United States TV coverage
- Network: ABC
- Announcers: Jim Lampley; Steve Davis

The 1980 Liberty Bowl, a college football postseason bowl game, was played on December 27, 1980, in Memphis, Tennessee. The 22nd edition of the Liberty Bowl saw the Purdue Boilermakers defeat the Missouri Tigers, 28–25.

== Background ==
After 9–2–1 and 10-2 seasons the prior two years, Purdue was ranked #9 to begin the season. However, they began the season 1-2 after losses to Notre Dame and UCLA and out of the polls. They promptly won their next six games to be ranked #16 going into a game versus Michigan, which they lost handily, 26-0. A victory over Indiana in the Old Oaken Bucket gave them eight victories on the season. Mark Herrmann broke the NCAA's career record for passing yardage, finishing his collegiate career 772 of 1,309 for 9,946 yards, 71 touchdowns, and 75 interceptions. As for Missouri, they had won their first three games en route to being ranked #9 prior to playing Penn State at home. However, they lost 29-21, though they would win their next three games to be at 6-1 before losing to Nebraska and losing to Oklahoma two weeks later to finish third in the Big Eight Conference. This was Purdue's first ever Liberty Bowl and Missouri's second Liberty Bowl appearance in two years.

== Game summary ==
Purdue scored first on a Mark Herrmann touchdown pass to Bart Burrell to give the team a 7-0 lead in the first quarter. In the second, they went up 14-0 on a Steve Bryant catch from Herrmann from 43 yards out. Missouri responded with a kickoff return for a touchdown; on Missouri's next possession, George Shorthose handed the ball off to Ron Fellows that went 92 yards for a touchdown to make it 14-6 (after a missed kick). James Wilder scored on a touchdown plunge with 8:44 to go in the half to narrow the lead, but the conversion attempt failed, keeping it at 14-12. Before the half ended, Dave Young caught a touchdown pass from Herrmann to make it 21-12. Burrell caught a 27-yard pass from Herrmann to make it 28-12 in the third quarter. Missouri could only muster a field goal in the third to make it 28-15. In the fourth quarter, Herrmann deliberately knelt in the endzone in order to do a free kick, which made it 28-17. Terry Hill scored on a plunge from a yard out to narrow the lead, with a pass from Phil Bradley to Tim Hornof for the successful conversion to make it 28-25. Purdue got the ball again and with 1:26 on the clock and fourth down at mid field, Young called for a punt. The punter no helmet, no mouthpiece, and no shoes on. Bosché got dressed and ran out to kick. On a low snap, Bosché fielded it and punted it high down field and with a good bounce, Tim Seneff downed it at the 4 yard line to lock things in. For Purdue, Mark Herrmann went 22-of-28 for 289 yards and four touchdowns. For Missouri, Bradley went 16-of-29 for 210 yards and one interception. Purdue had 124 rushing yards, 289 passing yards, one turnover, and 5 penalties for 31 yards. Missouri had 103 rushing yards, 210 passing yards, one turnover, and one penalty for five yards.

== Aftermath ==
Purdue went four years without a bowl appearance (until the 1984 Peach Bowl) and did not have consecutive bowl appearances again until 1998. They did not win a bowl game until 1997. This remains the most recent Liberty Bowl for Purdue, while Missouri returned to this bowl game in 2018, as a member of the SEC.
