= Bobby Kimball (American football) =

American football player (born 1957)

No. 85
- Position: Wide receiver

Personal information
- Born: March 12, 1957 (age 69); Camarillo, California, U.S.
- Listed height: 6 ft 1 in (1.85 m)
- Listed weight: 190 lb (86 kg)

Career information
- High school: Camarillo (CA)
- College: Oklahoma
- NFL draft: 1979: undrafted

Career history
- Green Bay Packers (1979–1980)

Career NFL statistics
- Games played: 8
- Stats at Pro Football Reference

Robert Lund Kimball (born March 12, 1957) is an American former professional football player in the National Football League (NFL). Kimball was born on March 12, 1957, in Camarillo, California, where he attended Camarillo High School. After high school, he attended Ventura College for two years, where he played college football. He then transferred to the University of Oklahoma, where he played wide receiver for their football team. At the time, Oklahoma was more known for their rushing game, limiting Kimball's opportunities as a pass catcher, although he had a lot of experience blocking.

Kimball went undrafted in the 1979 NFL draft, although he signed with the Green Bay Packers as an undrafted free agent. After a solid showing the preseason, he became the only rookie free agent to make the team. He was expected to be utilized primarily on the punt and kick return teams. Part way through his first season, he injured his knee, which required surgery. He returned the next season, but only played in one game. In total, he played for the Packers for two seasons, appearing in eight games, and recording zero catches.
