= 1978 Oklahoma State Cowboys football team =

American college football season

1978 Oklahoma State Cowboys football
- Conference: Big Eight Conference
- Record: 3–8 (3–4 Big 8)
- Head coach: Jim Stanley (6th season)
- Home stadium: Lewis Field

1978 Big Eight Conference football standings
	Conf.					Overall
Team	W		L		T	W		L		T
No. 3 Oklahoma +	6	–	1	–	0	11	–	1	–	0
No. 8 Nebraska +	6	–	1	–	0	9	–	3	–	0
No. 15 Missouri	4	–	3	–	0	8	–	4	–	0
Iowa State	4	–	3	–	0	8	–	4	–	0
Kansas State	3	–	4	–	0	4	–	7	–	0
Oklahoma State	3	–	4	–	0	3	–	8	–	0
Colorado	2	–	5	–	0	6	–	5	–	0
Kansas	0	–	7	–	0	1	–	10	–	0
+ – Conference co-champions; Rankings from AP Poll

The 1978 Oklahoma State Cowboys football team represented Oklahoma State University as a member of the Big Eight Conference during the 1978 NCAA Division I-A football season. Led by Jim Stanley in his sixth and final season as head coach, the Cowboys compiled an overall record of 3–8 with a mark of 3–4 in conference play, tying for fifth place in the Big 8. Oklahoma State played home games at Lewis Field in Stillwater, Oklahoma

== Schedule ==
Date	Opponent	Site	Result	Attendance	Source
September 9	at Wichita State*	Cessna Stadium; Wichita, KS	L 10–20	30,518	
September 16	at No. 16 Florida State*	Doak Campbell Stadium; Tallahassee, FL	L 20–38	40,338	
September 23	No. 2 Arkansas*	Lewis Field; Stillwater, OK	L 7–19	49,500	
September 30	vs. North Texas State*	Texas Stadium; Irving, TX	L 7–12	21,800	
October 7	at Kansas State	KSU Stadium; Manhattan, KS	L 7–18	21,900	
October 14	No. 13 Colorado	Lewis Field; Stillwater, OK	W 24–20	41,200	
October 21	Kansas	Lewis Field; Stillwater, OK	W 21–7	35,336	
October 28	at No. 4 Nebraska	Memorial Stadium; Lincoln, NE	L 14–22	75,786	
November 4	Missouri^{†}	Lewis Field; Stillwater, OK	W 35–20	47,750	
November 11	Iowa State	Lewis Field; Stillwater, OK	L 15–28	40,300	
November 18	at No. 4 Oklahoma	Oklahoma Memorial Stadium; Norman, OK (Bedlam Series)	L 7–62	72,339	
*Non-conference game; ^{†}Homecoming; Rankings from AP Poll released prior to the game

== After the season ==
The 1979 NFL draft was held on May 3–4, 1979. The following Cowboys were selected.

Round	Pick	Player	Position	NFL team
9	223	Scott Burk	Defensive back	Cincinnati Bengals
10	254	Steve Stephens	Tight end	Baltimore Colts
