= 1978 Colorado Buffaloes football team =

American college football season

1978 Colorado Buffaloes football
- Conference: Big Eight Conference
- Record: 6–5 (2–5 Big 8)
- Head coach: Bill Mallory (5th season)
- Offensive coordinator: George Belu (5th season)
- Offensive scheme: I formation
- Defensive coordinator: Bob Reublin (5th season)
- Base defense: 5–2
- MVPs: James Mayberry; Jeff Lee
- Captains: Jeff Lee; James Mayberry; Matt Miller; Stuart Walker
- Home stadium: Folsom Field

1978 Big Eight Conference football standings
	Conf.					Overall
Team	W		L		T	W		L		T
No. 3 Oklahoma +	6	–	1	–	0	11	–	1	–	0
No. 8 Nebraska +	6	–	1	–	0	9	–	3	–	0
No. 15 Missouri	4	–	3	–	0	8	–	4	–	0
Iowa State	4	–	3	–	0	8	–	4	–	0
Kansas State	3	–	4	–	0	4	–	7	–	0
Oklahoma State	3	–	4	–	0	3	–	8	–	0
Colorado	2	–	5	–	0	6	–	5	–	0
Kansas	0	–	7	–	0	1	–	10	–	0
+ – Conference co-champions; Rankings from AP Poll

The 1978 Colorado Buffaloes football team represented the University of Colorado in the Big Eight Conference during the 1978 NCAA Division I-A football season. Led by fifth-year head coach Bill Mallory, the Buffaloes compiled an overall record of 6–5 with a mark of 2–5 in conference play, placing seventh in the Big 8. Colorado played home games on campus at Folsom Field in Boulder, Colorado.

Colorado again won its first five games, all at home, but then lost five of six and Mallory was fired on November 21 by athletic director Eddie Crowder, the previous head coach. Mallory was succeeded by Chuck Fairbanks, the head coach of the New England Patriots in the National Football League (NFL) for six years and formerly at conference foe Oklahoma (1967–72).

The next winning season for Colorado was seven years later, in 1985.

== Schedule ==
Date	Opponent	Rank	Site	TV	Result	Attendance	Source
September 9	Oregon*		Folsom Field; Boulder, CO		W 24–7	45,389	
September 16	Miami (FL)*		Folsom Field; Boulder, CO		W 17–7	44,714	
September 23	San Jose State*	No. 19	Folsom Field; Boulder, CO		W 22–7	44,868	
September 30	Northwestern*	No. 16	Folsom Field; Boulder, CO		W 55–7	44,709	
October 7	Kansas^{†}	No. 13	Folsom Field; Boulder, CO		W 17–7	46,345–50,232	
October 14	at Oklahoma State	No. 13	Lewis Field; Stillwater, OK		L 20–24	41,200	
October 21	No. 5 Nebraska		Folsom Field; Boulder, CO (rivalry)		L 14–52	53,262	
October 28	at No. 13 Missouri		Faurot Field; Columbia, MO	ABC	W 28–27	71,096	
November 4	at No. 1 Oklahoma		Folsom Field; Boulder, CO		L 7–28	52,553	
November 11	at Kansas State		KSU Stadium; Manhattan, KS (rivalry)		L 10–20	13,100	
November 18	Iowa State		Folsom Field; Boulder, CO	ABC	L 16–20	46,321	
*Non-conference game; ^{†}Homecoming; Rankings from AP Poll released prior to the game
