= Reggie Kinlaw =

American football player (born 1957)

No. 62, 63
- Position: Defensive tackle

Personal information
- Born: January 9, 1957 (age 69); Miami, Florida, U.S.
- Listed height: 6 ft 2 in (1.88 m)
- Listed weight: 245 lb (111 kg)

Career information
- High school: Miami Springs
- College: Oklahoma
- NFL draft: 1979: 12th round, 320th overall pick

Career history
- Oakland/Los Angeles Raiders (1979–1984); Seattle Seahawks (1985–1986)

Awards and highlights
- 2× Super Bowl champion (XV, XVIII); National champion (1975); 2× First-team All-American (1977, 1978); 2× First-team All-Big Eight (1977, 1978)

Career NFL statistics
- Sacks: 8
- Fumble recoveries: 1
- Stats at Pro Football Reference

Reginald Kinlaw (born January 9, 1957) is an American former professional football player who was a defensive tackle in the National Football League (NFL). He played college football for the Oklahoma Sooners before playing in the NFL for the Oakland/Los Angeles Raiders and Seattle Seahawks. He graduated from Miami Springs Senior High School.

Drafted 320th overall in the final round of the 1979 NFL draft, Kinlaw soon worked his way into the rotation on the defensive line. He went on to become a mainstay at the nose tackle position, starting on Raider Super Bowl winners following the 1980 and 1983 seasons. He was considered an unsung hero on those defenses, which featured stars like Ted Hendricks, Rod Martin, Matt Millen, and, later, Howie Long, Lyle Alzado, and Greg Townsend. Despite being somewhat undersized at 6-2 and 250 pounds, Kinlaw's quickness demanded double teams, freeing up his teammates to make big plays. "Reggie was the REAL hero of our defense! He was so quick, they always had to double-team him. That would allow us, in the secondary, to make plays." - Lester Hayes, CB, Raiders.

Reggie Kinlaw coached the defensive line at the varsity level at St. Francis High School in La Cañada, Flintridge, California. He has a daughter Dionne Kinlaw and son Reggie Kinlaw II. His son Reggie Kinlaw II, also coached the defensive line on the Junior Varsity level at St. Francis High School. Reggie retired and moved to Las Vegas in 2012. He has been a heavily involved Alumni since the Raiders moved to Vegas.
