= 1978 Nebraska Cornhuskers football team =

American college football season

1978 Nebraska Cornhuskers football

Big 8 co-champion

Orange Bowl, L 24–31 vs. Oklahoma
- Conference: Big Eight Conference

Ranking
- Coaches: No. 8
- AP: No. 8
- Record: 9–3 (6–1 Big 8)
- Head coach: Tom Osborne (6th season)
- Offensive coordinator: Jerry Moore (1st season)
- Offensive scheme: I formation
- Defensive coordinator: Lance Van Zandt (2nd season)
- Base defense: 5–2
- Home stadium: Memorial Stadium

1978 Big Eight Conference football standings
	Conf.					Overall
Team	W		L		T	W		L		T
No. 3 Oklahoma +	6	–	1	–	0	11	–	1	–	0
No. 8 Nebraska +	6	–	1	–	0	9	–	3	–	0
No. 15 Missouri	4	–	3	–	0	8	–	4	–	0
Iowa State	4	–	3	–	0	8	–	4	–	0
Kansas State	3	–	4	–	0	4	–	7	–	0
Oklahoma State	3	–	4	–	0	3	–	8	–	0
Colorado	2	–	5	–	0	6	–	5	–	0
Kansas	0	–	7	–	0	1	–	10	–	0
+ – Conference co-champions; Rankings from AP Poll

The 1978 Nebraska Cornhuskers football team represented the University of Nebraska–Lincoln in the 1978 NCAA Division I-A football season. The team was coached by Tom Osborne and played their home games in Memorial Stadium in Lincoln, Nebraska.

== Schedule ==
Date	Time	Opponent	Rank	Site	TV	Result	Attendance	Source
September 2	8:05 pm	at No. 1 Alabama*	No. 10	Legion Field; Birmingham, AL	ABC	L 3–20	77,023	
September 9	1:30 pm	California*	No. 10	Memorial Stadium; Lincoln, NE		W 36–26	75,780	
September 16	1:30 pm	Hawaii*	No. 12	Memorial Stadium; Lincoln, NE		W 56–10	75,615	
September 30	12:50 pm	at Indiana*	No. 12	Memorial Stadium; Bloomington, IN	ABC	W 69–17	42,738	
October 7	1:30 pm	at No. 15 Iowa State	No. 10	Cyclone Stadium; Ames, IA (rivalry)		W 23–0	51,450	
October 14	1:30 pm	Kansas State^{†}	No. 8	Memorial Stadium; Lincoln, NE (rivalry)		W 48–14	75,818	
October 21	2:30 pm	Colorado	No. 5	Folsom Field; Boulder, CO (rivalry)		W 52–14	53,262	
October 28	1:30 pm	Oklahoma State	No. 4	Memorial Stadium; Lincoln, NE		W 22–14	75,786	
November 4	1:30 pm	at Kansas	No. 4	Memorial Stadium; Lawrence, KS (rivalry)		W 63–21	50,463	
November 11	11:30 am	No. 1 Oklahoma	No. 4	Memorial Stadium; Lincoln, NE (rivalry)	ABC	W 17–14	74,657	
November 18	1:30 pm	Missouri	No. 2	Memorial Stadium; Lincoln, NE (rivalry)		L 31–35	75,850	
January 1, 1979	7:00 pm	vs. No. 4 Oklahoma	No. 6	Miami Orange Bowl; Miami, FL (Orange Bowl) (rivalry)	NBC	L 24–31	66,365	
*Non-conference game; ^{†}Homecoming; Rankings from AP Poll released prior to the game; All times are in Central time

== Roster ==
Adams, Joe #2 (So.) LB; Andrews, George #96 (Sr.) DE; Baker, Kim #41 (So.) LB; Barnett, Bill #97 (Jr.) DT; Bergkamp, Tim #36 (So.) PK; Berns, Richard #35 (Sr.) IB; Bloom, Jeff #50 (Jr.) C Branch, Anthony #4 (So.) WB; Brown, Kenny #22 (Sr.) WB; Bruce, Mike #76 (So.) OT; Bryant, Bill #95 (Sr.) DT; Carlstrom, Tom #78 (So.) OG; Clark, David #63 (So.) DT; Clark, Kelvin #73 (Sr.) OT; Cole, Andy #56 (So.) MG; Cole, Lawrence #81 (Jr.) DE; Cooley, Lawrence #67 (Sr.) OG; Cotton, Barney #54 (Sr.) C Davies, Steve #82 (So.) TE; DeLoach, Trey #52 (So.) C Dunning, Bruce #40 (Jr.) LB; England, Gary #70 (Jr.) LB; Finn, Jeff #63 (So.) OG; Fischer, Tim #16 (Sr.) DB; Franklin, Andra #39 (So.) FB; Gary, Russell #9 (So.) DB; Gemar, Scott #1 (So.) PK; Glenn, Steve #71 (Sr.) OT; Goodspeed, Mark #72 (Jr.) OT; Hager, Gary #87 (So.) SE; Hager, Tim #10 (Jr.) QB; Hansen, Jeff #48 (Sr.) DB	Havekost, John #69 (Jr.) OG; Hedrick, Brian #43 (So.) DT; Hineline, Curt #59 (So.) MG; Hipp, I.M. #32 (Jr.) IB; Holmes, Daryl #94 (So.) DE; Horn, Rod #55 (Jr.) DT; Johnson, Craig #30 (So.) IB; Juehring, Chris #45 (So.) FB; Keith, Percy #21 (So.) IB; Kelly, Jim #49 (So.) FB; Kotera, Jim #44 (So.) FB; Krejci, Jeff #2 (So.) LB; Kunz, Lee #38 (Sr.) LB; LaFever, Dan #37 (So.) LB; Lee, Jeff #26 (Sr.) SE; Lee, Oudious #65 (Jr.) MG; LeRoy, Mark #23 (Jr.) DB; Letcher, Paul #8 (Jr.) DB; Lewis, Rodney #5 (So.) DB; Liegl, David #28 (Jr.) DB; Lindquist, Ric #15 (So.) DB; Lindquist, Steve #68 (Sr.) OG; Lindstrom, Dan #98 (So.) DE; Lockett, Frank #80 (Sr.) SE; Matthies, Tom #77 (So.) OT; Mauer, Mark #17 (So.) QB; McCloney, Maurice #31 (Fr.) WB; McCrady, Tim #24 (So.) WB; Means, Andy #34 (So.) DB; Michaelson, Steve #18 (So.) QB; Miller, Junior #89 (Jr.) TE; Minor, John #86 (Jr.) DE	Nelson, Derrie #92 (So.) DE; Ohrt, Tom #74 (Sr.) OT; Payne, Dennis #13 (Sr.) DB; Pensick, Dan #93 (Jr.) DT; Pillen, Jim #29 (Sr.) DB; Phillips, Patrick #94 (So.) DE; Poeschl, Randy #75 (Sr.) DT; Porter, G.M. (Budge) (Sr.) CB; Potadle, Paul #61 (Jr.) OG; Quinn, Jeff #11 (So.) QB; Rabas, Greg #85 (So.) TE; Ruud, John #46 (Jr.) LB; Ruzich, Mike #99 (So.) DT; Saalfeld, Kelly #57 (Jr.) C Schleusener, Randy #53 (So.) C Searcey, L.G. #42 (So.) DB; Selko, John #83 (Jr.) TE; Sherry, Scott #91 (So.) DE; Sims, Sammy #6 (So.) DB; Smith, Tim #84 (Jr.) SE; Sorley, Tom #12 (Sr.) QB; Steels, Anthony #33 (So.) WB; Steiner, Dan #58 (Jr.) OG; Stewart, Eric #19 (Jr.) DB; Swanigan, Raymond #53 (So.) LB; Sukup, Dean #3 (Jr.) PK; Theissen, Gordon #90 (Jr.) DE; Todd, Billy #14 (Sr.) PK; Vering, Tom #47 (Jr.) LB; Walton, Darrell #7 (Sr.) DB; Weinmaster, Kerry #51 (Jr.) MG; Williams, Brent #66 (So.) LB; Woodard, Scott #88 (So.) SE; Wurth, Tim #25 (Jr.) IB

=== Depth chart ===
Defense

FS
Jeff Hansen
Russell Gary
Eric Stewart

INSDIE	INSDIE
Bruce Dunning	Lee Kunz
Brent Williams	Tom Vering
Kim Baker	John Ruud

MONSTER BACK
Jim Pillen
Mark Leroy
Bob Plambeck

CB
Andy Means
Darrell Walton
David Ligel

DE	DT	NT	DT	DE
Georgie Andrews	Bill Barnett	Kerry Weinmater	Rod Horn	Lawrence Cole
Dan Lindstrom	Dan Pensick	Oudious Lee	David Clark	Derrie Nelson
Gordon Theissen	Randy Poeschl	Curt Hineline	Bill Bryant	Daryl Holmes

CB
Tim Fischer
Rodney Lewis
Paul Letcher

Offense

SE
Tim Smith
Frank Lockett
Scott Woodard

LT	LG	C	RG	RT
Kelvin Clark	Barney Cotton	Kelly Saalfeld	Steve Lindquist	Tom Ohrt
Dan Steiner	John Havekost	Jeff Bloom	Lawrence Cooley	Steve Glenn
Mark Goodspeed	Paul Potadle	Trey DeLoach	Randy Schleusener	Mike Bruce

TE
Junior Miller
Jeff Finn
John Selko

WB
Kenny Brown
Tim McCrady
Maurice McCloney

QB
Tom Sorley
Tim Hager
Jeff Quinn

FB
Rick Burns
Andra Franklin
Jim Kotera

Special teams
PK Billy Todd
P Tim Smith

RB
I.M Hipp
Rick Burns
Tim Wurth
Craig Johnson

== Coaching staff ==
Name	Title	First year in this position	Years at Nebraska	Alma mater
Tom Osborne	Head coach/offensive coordinator	1973	1964–1997	Hastings College
Jerry Moore	Receivers	1978	1973–1978	Baylor
Lance Van Zandt	Defensive coordinator Defensive backs	1977	1977–1980	Lamar
Cletus Fischer	Offensive line		1960–1985	Nebraska
John Melton	Linebackers	1973	1962–1988	Wyoming
Mike Corgan	Running backs	1962	1962–1982	Notre Dame
Boyd Epley	Head strength coach	1969	1969–2003	Nebraska
George Darlington	Defensive ends		1973–2002	Rutgers
Milt Tenopir	Offensive line	1974	1974–2002	Sterling
Guy Ingles	Freshman Head Coach		1976–1978	Nebraska
Gene Huey	Receivers	1977	1977–1986	Wyoming
Charlie McBride	Defensive line	1977	1977–1999	Colorado

== Game summaries ==
=== Alabama ===
#10 Nebraska at #1 Alabama [box score]

Team	1	2	3	4	Total
#10 Nebraska	3	0	0	0	3
• #1 Alabama	0	7	6	7	20

- Date: 1978-09-02
- Location: Legion Field, Birmingham, Alabama
- Game attendance: 77,023

Tom Osborne brought his Nebraska Cornhuskers into Birmingham to face Bear Bryant's top-ranked Crimson Tide to start the 1978 season. The game was nationally televised. Bear Bryant felt his team was not prepared enough for the game and did not feel his team deserved their #1 rating. Nebraska put the first points on the board with a field goal halfway through the 1st quarter. However, the game belonged to Alabama for the rest of the day with no further answer from Nebraska. Alabama suffered no fumbles and rolled up twice as many ground yards as Nebraska.

=== California ===
California at #10 Nebraska [box score]

Team	1	2	3	4	Total
California	7	0	7	12	26
• #10 Nebraska	0	7	7	22	36

- Date: 1978-09-09
- Location: Memorial Stadium, Lincoln, Nebraska
- Game attendance: 75,780

The Golden Bears were on the scoreboard first, but the Cornhuskers came back to tie midway through the 2nd quarter with help from a tricky two-handoff pass play to set up a score. The score was still tied at 14 through the 3rd quarter, before a surge of scoring opened up in the 4th as both teams combined for 34 points. Nebraska led on the ground 302–76, while California owned the air 271–190, but the Cornhuskers had more points at the final whistle.

=== Hawaii ===
Hawaii at #12 Nebraska [box score]

Team	1	2	3	4	Total
Hawaii	0	0	10	0	10
• #12 Nebraska	7	28	7	14	56

- Date: 1978-09-16
- Location: Memorial Stadium, Lincoln, Nebraska
- Game attendance: 75,615

Nebraska rolled to a dominating 35–0 1st half lead, and eight Cornhusker players scored during the course of the game as Hawaii allowed 599 yards of offense in their futile attempts to slow the onslaught. Hawaii's only touchdown came on the heels of a Nebraska fumble, and the spread was by then far too great for the Warriors to pose a threat to the Cornhuskers.

=== Indiana ===
#12 Nebraska at Indiana [box score]

Team	1	2	3	4	Total
• #12 Nebraska	28	7	14	20	69
Indiana	0	10	0	7	17

- Date: 1978-09-30
- Location: Memorial Stadium, Bloomington, Indiana
- Game attendance: 42,738

Nebraska scored on all of their first four possessions and jumped to a 28-lead in the 1st quarter, scoring more points than Indiana would muster on the entire day. Five Cornhusker runners found the end zone, as well as a Blackshirt who recovered a fumble, as Nebraska rolled up 613 yards of offense for the day.

=== Iowa State ===
#10 Nebraska at #15 Iowa State [box score]

Team	1	2	3	4	Total
• #10 Nebraska	6	3	0	14	23
#15 Iowa State	0	0	0	0	0

- Date: 1978-10-07
- Location: Cyclone Stadium, Ames, Iowa
- Game attendance: 51,450

Nebraska was the first on the board and never allowed Iowa State to join them afterwards, as they led 9–0 at halftime and tacked on 14 more before the final whistle, while capitalizing on two interceptions thrown by the Cyclones and holding Iowa State to just 82 yards of total offense at their own home field.

=== Kansas State ===
#8 Nebraska at Kansas State [box score]

Team	1	2	3	4	Total
• #8 Nebraska	0	14	21	13	48
Kansas State	0	7	0	7	14

- Date: 1978-10-14
- Location: Memorial Stadium, Lincoln, Nebraska
- Game attendance: 53,262

Kansas State made an effort to be competitive for a bit, but Nebraska kept going after obtaining a 14–7 halftime lead. The Wildcats were trailing by 28 before they put up their final 4th-quarter touchdown, which the Cornhuskers further marginalized with 13 additional points while posting their second consecutive 600+ yard game.

=== Colorado ===
Colorado at #5 Nebraska [box score]

Team	1	2	3	4	Total
Colorado	14	0	0	0	14
• #5 Nebraska	3	11	17	21	52

- Date: 1978-10-21
- Location: Folsom Field, Boulder, Colorado
- Game attendance: 75,818

Colorado jumped out to an 11-point lead in the 1st quarter, helped in part by a 100-yard kickoff return, but there would be no further Colorado points allowed as Nebraska tallied 49 straight unanswered points for a win, while recording their third consecutive game with over 600 yards of offense.

=== Oklahoma State ===
Oklahoma State at #4 Nebraska [box score]

Team	1	2	3	4	Total
Oklahoma State	7	0	7	0	14
• #4 Nebraska	0	19	3	0	22

- Date: 1978-10-28
- Location: Memorial Stadium, Lincoln, Nebraska
- Game attendance: 75,786

Oklahoma State held Nebraska to around half of the total offensive yards the Cornhuskers had accumulated in each of the last three games. Statistically it was close, as the Cowboys barely led in the air 110–99, while the Cornhuskers barely led on the ground 217–213, and the Cowboys also held the edge in 1st downs 17–15. But Nebraska scored a 42-yard field goal with 15 seconds left to play, going ahead by 8 and holding on for the win.

=== Kansas ===
#4 Nebraska at Kansas [box score]

Team	1	2	3	4	Total
• #4 Nebraska	7	35	14	7	63
Kansas	0	7	8	6	21

- Date: 1978-11-04
- Location: Memorial Stadium, Lawrence, Kansas
- Game attendance: 50,463

Nebraska started slow, only leading by 7 after the 1st quarter, but then the game blew open when the Cornhuskers put up four unanswered touchdowns in the 2nd and five overall, leading 42–7 at the half. The Jayhawks gamely put up 14 more points before the day was over, but not nearly enough to catch up, let alone overcome the additional 21 posted by the Cornhuskers before the final whistle. Nebraska's 799 total yards of offense set a new Big 8 record.

=== Oklahoma ===
#1 Oklahoma at #4 Nebraska [box score]

Team	1	2	3	4	Total
#1 Oklahoma	7	0	7	0	14
• #4 Nebraska	0	7	7	3	17

- Date: 1978-11-11
- Location: Memorial Stadium, Lincoln, Nebraska
- Game attendance: 76,015
- Referee: Earl Shostrom
- TV announcers (ABC): Keith Jackson and Frank Broyles

The game was the biggest since the original Nebraska-Oklahoma Game of the Century in 1971, as the top-ranked and undefeated Oklahoma Sooners arrived in Lincoln to defend their ranking and possibly settle the 1978 Big 8 title with Nebraska. Oklahoma put up the first score, which was matched by Nebraska by halftime, and the game was still tied at 14 at the start of the 4th quarter. Nebraska put up the go-ahead field goal just minutes into the 4th, and the ensuing battle pitted the vaunted Oklahoma offense against the stalwart Blackshirts, who held until the end, finally forcing Oklahoma RB Billy Sims to fumble on the Nebraska 3 with 3:27 remaining to play and sealing the first Cornhusker victory over the Sooners since the famous 1971 contest.

=== Missouri ===
Missouri at #2 Nebraska [box score]

Team	1	2	3	4	Total
• Missouri	7	7	14	7	35
#2 Nebraska	14	3	14	0	31

- Date: 1978-11-18
- Location: Memorial Stadium, Lincoln, Nebraska
- Game attendance: 75,850

The Cornhuskers were riding high from their win over #1 Oklahoma, but the Missouri Tigers downed the Cornhuskers in Lincoln 35–31. Nebraska RB Rick Berns, soon to be drafted by the Tampa Bay Buccaneers, started the day by tearing off an 82-yard run to set the tone. Nebraska was able to cling to a slim 3-point halftime lead through the 3rd quarter, but failed to answer Missouri's final touchdown with 3:42 remaining to play, which subsequently and unexpectedly sent both Oklahoma and Nebraska to the Orange Bowl to once again face each other.

=== Oklahoma ===
#6 Nebraska vs #4 Oklahoma [box score]

Team	1	2	3	4	Total
• #4 Oklahoma	7	7	17	0	31
#6 Nebraska	7	0	3	14	24

- Date: 1979-01-01
- Location: Miami Orange Bowl, Miami
- Game start: 8:30 p.m. EST
- Game attendance: 66,365
- TV announcers (NBC): Dick Enberg and John Brodie

Just six weeks prior, Oklahoma and Nebraska met for the 1978 revisit of the "Game of the Century." Yet circumstances dictated that they would meet again for a rematch. Nebraska led the first down battle 27–17 and led Oklahoma in the air 220–47 as well as in total offense, but was hurt by two lost interceptions. Although behind by 7 at the half and falling to 31–10 by the end of the 3rd, the Cornhuskers rallied back and had a chance until IB Craig Johnson was stopped on a 4th-and-1 for no gain on the Sooners 7 with 8:07 left. Nebraska got the ball back and put it into the end zone again with :03 left on the clock to come within 7 points for the final score.

== Rankings ==
Ranking movements Legend: ██ Increase in ranking ██ Decrease in ranking
	Week																
Poll	Pre	1	2	3	4	5	6	7	8	9	10	11	12	13	14	15	Final
AP	4	4	5	4	4	4	4	3	3	2	2	2	2	6	5	4	8
Coaches																	8

== Awards ==
Award	Name(s)
National Coach of the Year	Tom Osborne
All-America 1st team	George Andrews, Kelvin Clark
All-America 2nd team	Steve Lindquist
All-America 3rd team	Junior Miller
All-America honorable mention	Rick Berns, I. M. Hipp, Rod Horn, Lee Kunz
Big 8 Coach of the Year	Tom Osborne
All-Big 8 1st team	George Andrews, Rick Berns, Kelvin Clark, Steve Lindquist, Junior Miller, Jim Pillen
All-Big 8 2nd team	Kenny Brown, Barney Cotton, I. M. Hipp, Rod Horn, Lee Kunz, Tim Smith, Billy Todd, Kerry Weinmaster
All-Big 8 honorable mention	Andra Franklin, Jeff Hansen, Andy Means, Derrie Nelson, Tom Ohrt, Kelly Saalfeld, Tom Sorley

=== NFL and pro players ===
The following Nebraska players who participated in the 1978 season later moved on to the next level and joined a professional or semi-pro team as draftees or free agents.

Name	Team
Bill Barnett	Miami Dolphins
Rick Berns	Tampa Bay Buccaneers
Kelvin Clark	Denver Broncos
Barney Cotton	Cincinnati Bengals
Andra Franklin	Miami Dolphins
Russell Gary	New Orleans Saints
Mark Goodspeed	St. Louis Cardinals
Rod Horn	Cincinnati Bengals
Lee Kunz	Chicago Bears
Jeff Lee	St. Louis Cardinals
Oudious Lee	St. Louis Cardinals
Rodney Lewis	New Orleans Saints
Frank Lockett	Boston Breakers
Junior Miller	Atlanta Falcons
Derrie Nelson	San Diego Chargers
Jeff Quinn	Pittsburgh Steelers
Anthony Steels	Boston Breakers
