= Thomas Lott =

American football player (born 1957)

No. 26
- Positions: Quarterback, running back

Personal information
- Born: August 1, 1957 (age 69); San Antonio, Texas, U.S.
- Listed height: 5 ft 11 in (1.80 m)
- Listed weight: 205 lb (93 kg)

Career information
- High school: John Jay (San Antonio, Texas)
- College: Oklahoma
- NFL draft: 1979: 6th round, 144th overall pick

Career history
- St. Louis Cardinals (1979); New Jersey Generals (1983)

Awards and highlights
- 2× First-team All-Big Eight (1977, 1978)

Career NFL statistics
- Rushing yards: 50
- Rushing average: 4.5
- Receptions: 2
- Receiving yards: 8
- Stats at Pro Football Reference

Thomas Willie Lott Jr. (born August 1, 1957) is an American former professional football player who was a running back and return specialist in the National Football League (NFL) and United States Football League (USFL). Lott played college football for the Oklahoma Sooners, where he was a quarterback. He played two professional seasons, one each in the NFL for the St. Louis Cardinals and the USFL for the New Jersey Generals, where he enjoyed a successful season returning kickoffs for the Generals, totaling over 1,100 yards.
