= 1978 Missouri Tigers football team =

American college football season

1978 Missouri Tigers football

Liberty Bowl champion

Liberty Bowl, W 20–15 vs. LSU
- Conference: Big Eight Conference

Ranking
- Coaches: No. 14
- AP: No. 15
- Record: 8–4 (4–3 Big 8)
- Head coach: Warren Powers (1st season)
- Defensive coordinator: Carl Reese (2nd season)
- Home stadium: Memorial Stadium

1978 Big Eight Conference football standings
	Conf.					Overall
Team	W		L		T	W		L		T
No. 3 Oklahoma +	6	–	1	–	0	11	–	1	–	0
No. 8 Nebraska +	6	–	1	–	0	9	–	3	–	0
No. 15 Missouri	4	–	3	–	0	8	–	4	–	0
Iowa State	4	–	3	–	0	8	–	4	–	0
Kansas State	3	–	4	–	0	4	–	7	–	0
Oklahoma State	3	–	4	–	0	3	–	8	–	0
Colorado	2	–	5	–	0	6	–	5	–	0
Kansas	0	–	7	–	0	1	–	10	–	0
+ – Conference co-champions; Rankings from AP Poll

The 1978 Missouri Tigers football team represented the University of Missouri during the 1978 NCAA Division I-A football season as a member of the Big Eight Conference (Big 8). The team was led by head coach Warren Powers, in his first year, and they played their home games at Faurot Field in Columbia, Missouri. They finished the season with a record of eight wins and four losses (8–4, 4–3 Big 8) and with a victory over LSU in the Liberty Bowl.

== Schedule ==
Date	Opponent	Rank	Site	TV	Result	Attendance	Source
September 9	at No. 5 Notre Dame*		Notre Dame Stadium; Notre Dame, IN		W 3–0	59,075	
September 16	No. 1 Alabama*	No. 11	Faurot Field; Columbia, MO		L 20–38	73,655	
September 23	Ole Miss*	No. 17	Faurot Field; Columbia, MO		W 45–14	60,287	
September 30	at No. 1 Oklahoma	No. 14	Oklahoma Memorial Stadium; Norman, OK (rivalry)		L 23–45	72,371	
October 7	Illinois*		Faurot Field; Columbia, MO		W 45–3	62,062	
October 14	No. 20 Iowa State	No. 19	Faurot Field; Columbia, MO (rivalry)		W 26–13	63,106	
October 21	at Kansas State	No. 13	KSU Stadium; Manhattan, KS		W 56–14	24,500	
October 28	Colorado^{†}	No. 13	Faurot Field; Columbia, MO	ABC	L 27–28	71,096	
November 4	at Oklahoma State		Lewis Field; Stillwater, OK		L 20–35	47,750	
November 11	Kansas		Faurot Field; Columbia, MO (Border War)		W 48–0	64,453	
November 18	at No. 2 Nebraska		Memorial Stadium; Lincoln, NE (rivalry)		W 35–31	75,850	
December 23	vs. LSU*	No. 18	Liberty Bowl Memorial Stadium; Memphis, TN (Liberty Bowl)	ABC	W 20–15	53,064	
*Non-conference game; ^{†}Homecoming; Rankings from AP Poll released prior to the game

== Roster ==
1978 Missouri Tigers football team roster
Players
Coaches
Offense

Pos.	#	Name	Class
RB		James Wilder
TE	83	Kellen Winslow	Sr

Defense

Pos.	#	Name	Class

Special teams

Pos.	#	Name	Class
K		Jeff Brockhaus

Head coach

- Warren Powers

Coordinators/assistant coaches

- Mike Price – Quarterback/wide receiver
- Billy Thornton – Running backs
- Dick Beechner – Tight ends/special teams coordinator
- John Faiman – Offensive line
- Carl Reese – Defensive coordinator
- George Wheeler – Defensive tackles
- Zaven Yaralian – Defensive backs
- Curtis Jones Sr – Assistant
- Mark Heydorff – Assistant

Legend

- (C) Team captain
- (S) Suspended
- (I) Ineligible
- Injured
- Redshirt

== 1979 NFL draft ==
Player	Position	Round	Pick	NFL club
Kellen Winslow	Tight end	1	13	San Diego Chargers
James Wilder Sr.	Running back	2	34	Tampa Bay Buccaneers

== Awards and honors ==
- Warren Powers, Walter Camp Coach of the Year
