= Akron Zips football =

Football team of the University of Akron

| 2026 Akron Zips football team |
- First season: 1891; 135 years ago
- Athletic director: Charles Guthrie
- Head coach: Joe Moorhead; 4th season, 13–35 (.271)
- Location: Akron, Ohio
- Stadium: InfoCision Stadium (capacity: 30,000)
- NCAA division: Division I FBS
- Conference: MAC
- Colors: Blue and gold
- All-time record: 534–608–36 (.469)
- Bowl record: 1–2 (.333)

Conference championships
- MAC: 2005

Division championships
- MAC East: 2000, 2005, 2017
- Consensus All-Americans: 1
- Rivalries: Kent State (rivalry); Youngstown State (rivalry)

Uniforms
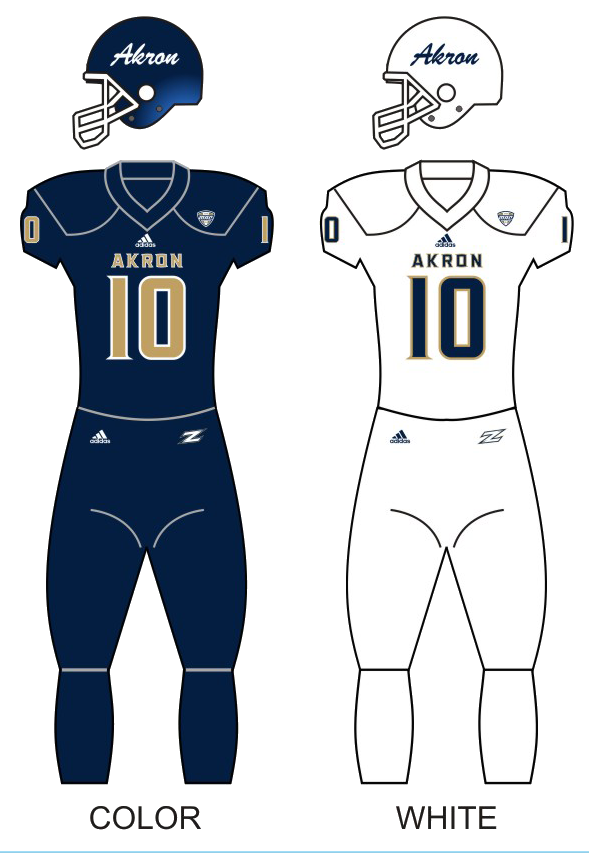
- Fight song: Akron Blue and Gold
- Mascot: Zippy
- Marching band: Ohio's Pride
- Outfitter: Nike
- Website: GoZips.com

The Akron Zips football team is a college football program representing the University of Akron in the Football Bowl Subdivision (FBS) of the National Collegiate Athletic Association (NCAA). Akron plays its home games at InfoCision Stadium on the campus of the University of Akron in Akron, Ohio. The Zips compete in the Mid-American Conference (MAC); it had been in the conference's East Division before the MAC eliminated its football divisions in 2024.

The team was established in 1891 when the school was known as Buchtel College; it became the University of Akron in 1913. In 1926, the athletic teams were named the Zippers, after rubber boots manufactured by the B.F. Goodrich Company, which was headquartered in Akron at the time. The name was shortened to "Zips" in 1950. Akron was originally classified as a Small College school in the 1937 season until 1972. Akron received Division II classification in 1973, before becoming a Division I-AA program in 1980 and a Division I-A (now FBS) program in 1987. The Zips were the first team to move from Division I-AA to Division I-A. In 2005, the Zips won the Mid-American Conference championship for the first time in the program's history. Through the 2023 season, the Zips have an overall record of 528–584–36.

== History ==
=== Early history (1891–1972) ===
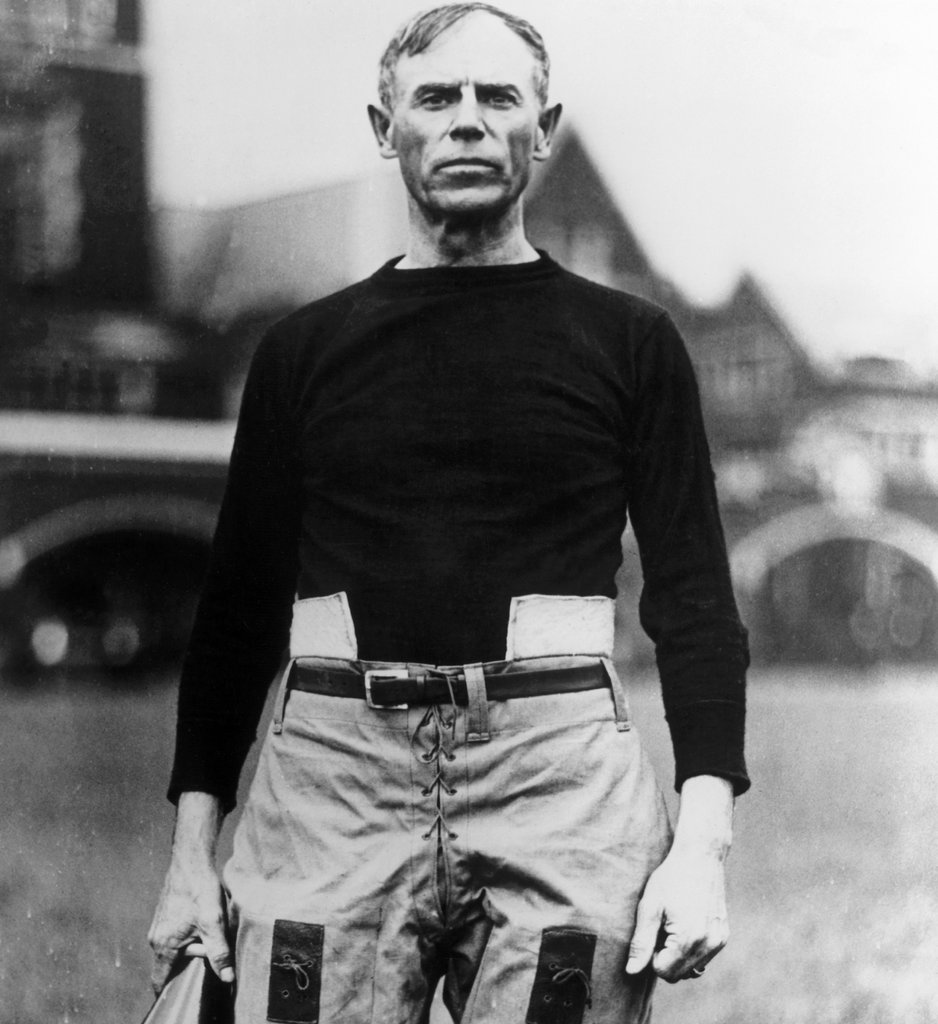
John Heisman

The University of Akron football team was established in 1891. In their first game, the team, then called Buchtel College, defeated Western Reserve Academy by a score of 22–6 in Hudson, Ohio. Buchtel went on to finish its first season with a 1–3 record. The following year, Buchtel hired Frank Cook as the school's first ever head coach. Cook led Buchtel to a 3–4 record during his only season has head coach. In 1893, the college hired John Heisman to become the football and baseball coach. Heisman lead Buchtel to their first winning season with a 5–2 record in 1893, and then led them to their first undefeated season, albeit a single game season in which they defeated the Ohio State Buckeyes. While at Buchtel, Heisman also helped invent the snap, which is still used in modern-day football. The early years for Buchtel saw many coaching changes, as the program went through nine different coaches in the 22-year span. Buchtel College changed its name to the University of Akron in 1913.

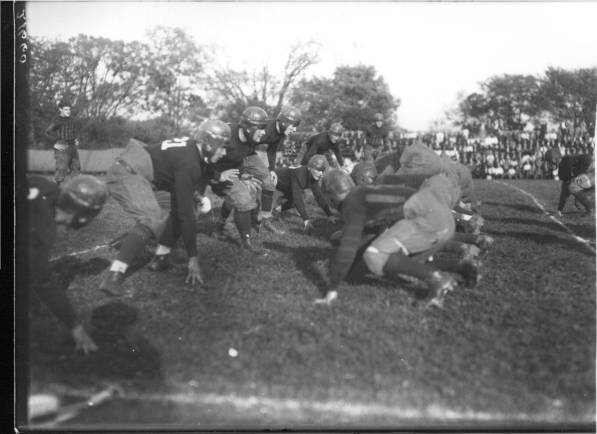
Akron's 1922 football team against Miami (OH)

Coach Fred Sefton served as the head football coach of the Zippers for nine seasons, from 1915 to 1923, compiling a record of 33–34–4. Sefton's teams posted winning records in five of Sefton's nine seasons, including four of his final five. Sefton resigned as head coach after the 1923 season. James W. Coleman was hired as Akron's head football coach after Sefton's resignation. His final record in two seasons with the Zippers is 6–10. George Babcock took over as head coach after Coleman's departure and led the Zips to a 5–2–2 record before departing to accept the head football coach position at Cincinnati. Red Blair was hired as the team's next head coach after Babcock's departure. In nine seasons at the helm of the Zips, Blair's teams compiled a record of 43–30–5. Blair's 1929 Akron team compiled a record of 9–1. His 1930 team went 7–1 and his 1935 team posted a 6–3 record for the best three years of Blair's tenure. Blair resigned as head coach of the Zips after the 1935 season. Jim Aiken was hired as the Zippers' head coach after Blair's resignation. Aiken's three seasons were all winning, as his teams compiled yearly records of 6–2–1, 7–2 and 6–3 for a grand total of 19–7–1. Aiken departed the Zips after the 1938 season to accept the head football coach position at Nevada.

Thomas Dowler was hired to lead the Zippers football program after Aiken's departure. In two seasons as head coach, Dowler's teams compiled a record of 7–9–2. Otis Douglas took over the reins of the Akron football program after Dowler and his teams struggled. In two seasons, the Zippers posted a record of 5–10–3 that included a winless 0–7–2 mark in what turned out to be Douglas' final season. Akron did not field a football team from 1943 to 1945 due to the events surrounding World War II. Paul Baldacci was hired as Akron's head coach after the three season hiatus was over. Baldacci served as head coach for two seasons, compiling a record of 7–10 that included yearly records of 5–4 and 2–6. Akron's on-the-field struggles continued during the tenure of Baldacci's successor, William Houghton, whose tenure produced a 7–27–1 record with no winning seasons or more than two wins in a single season. Under head coach Kenneth Cochrane, the Zippers broke out of their slump, posting yearly records of 2–6–1 and 6–3 before Cochrane stepped down to focus on his duties as athletics director at Akron. Cochrane shorted the school's athletic nickname from "Zippers" to "Zips". Joe McMullen came to Akron from Washington & Jefferson and achieved moderate success as the Zips head coach. While his teams did compile an overall winning record during McMullen's seven-season tenure (30–28–3), declining records of 4–5 and 1–8 led to his firing after the 1960 season. In 1961, the Zips hired Gordon Larson, who had been an assistant coach under Woody Hayes at Ohio State. Larson helped the Zips finish 2nd in the Ohio Athletic Conference 3 times in his first five seasons, going 26–8 in conference play during those five season. In 1966, the Zips left the Ohio Athletic Conference, and became an Independent football program. During its Independence era, the Zips put together the best run in school history, winning 38 games from 1968 to 1971, also going to the 1968 Grantland Rice Bowl. In 12 seasons, Larson had a record of 74–33–5. At the time of his retirement from coach, Larson was the all-time wins leader among head coaches in Akron football history. Larson remained at the university as the athletics director.

=== Jim Dennison era (1973–1985) ===
In 1973, the Zips promoted long-time assistant, Jim Dennison to replace the retired Larson. His 1976 Akron squad played for the NCAA Division II championship (Pioneer Bowl), losing to the Montana State Bobcats, 24–13. Under Dennison's tutelage, the Zips transitioned from NCAA Division II to Division I-AA and posted an 80–62–2 record that included a I-AA playoff berth in 1985 and nine winning seasons in Dennison's thirteen. Despite these successes, Dennison was fired as head coach after the 1985 season.

=== Gerry Faust era (1986–1994) ===
In 1985, Akron president William Muse replaced Dennison with former Notre Dame head coach Gerry Faust. Muse wanted the program to have "instant credibility" during its transition into a 1-A school in 1987. Adams and Muse felt that Faust was more prepared to lead the Zips as they transitioned into a 1-A institution. Faust struggled to get acclimated to the small budget school, struggling to a 25–23–2 start after his first 4 seasons with the Zips. Faust's Zips teams never won more than seven games in one season. Following a 1–10 finish in 1994, he was relieved of his coaching duties and became a fundraiser for the university. Faust's 43 wins placed him 3rd in Akron career wins leaders. The Zips became the first ever program to transition from I-AA to 1-A when they made the move in 1987. Akron joined the Mid-American Conference in 1992.

=== Lee Owens era (1995–2003) ===
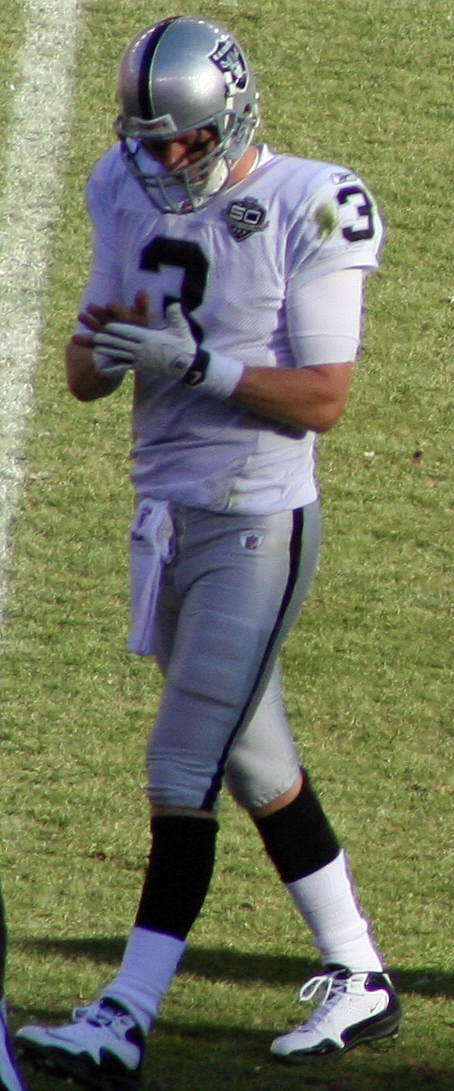
Charlie Frye, Akron's career total offense leader

Lee Owens, a former Ohio State assistant and highly successful Ohio high school head coach, was hired by the Zips as head football coach after Faust's firing. Owens had three winning seasons (most by any Akron coach during the major-college era), including a MAC East co-championship in 2000 (shared with Marshall), but his overall record was 40–61, which led to his firing by athletics director Mike Thomas after nine seasons. Jason Taylor (Pro Football Hall of Fame), Dwight Smith (consensus All-American, Super Bowl champion) and Charlie Frye (NFL QB) were among star players during Owens' tenure.

=== J. D. Brookhart era (2004–2009) ===
J. D. Brookhart, previously offensive coordinator at Pittsburgh, became the 25th head coach of Akron on December 15, 2003, the program's third head coach since gaining Division I-A status in 1987. In his second season, he led the Zips to their first Mid-American Conference championship and their first bowl game in school history, the 2005 Motor City Bowl, which they lost, 38–31, to the Memphis. He was fired after the 2009 season, when the Zips went 3–9. Brookhart's final record at Akron is 30–42.

=== Rob Ianello era (2010–2011) ===
In December 2009, Akron hired Rob Ianello, previously wide receivers coach at Notre Dame, as the Zips head football coach. He lost his first eleven games as a head coach before getting the victory over Buffalo in the final game of the 2010 season. His only other win as Akron's head football coach was a 36–13 defeat of VMI (a Football Championship Subdivision team) in 2011. Ianello was fired as Akron's head coach after just two seasons and a dismal 2–22 record.

=== Terry Bowden era (2012–2018) ===
On December 22, 2011, it was announced North Alabama head coach Terry Bowden, son of legendary coach Bobby Bowden, would be hired as the 27th head football coach of the Akron Zips, and he was formally introduced on December 28, 2011. An Akron assistant coach in 1986 under head coach Gerry Faust, Terry Bowden had achieved notoriety in the 1990s with a successful six-year stint as the head football coach at Auburn, compiling a record of 47–17–1 that included a twenty-game winning streak. In his first year, Bowden duplicated Ianello's 1–11 record from 2011 in what was dubbed as a rebuilding year.

On September 14, 2013, Bowden led Akron against the University of Michigan in Ann Arbor and came within a few yards of defeating the Wolverines, losing 28–24 after an incomplete pass from the Wolverines' 3-yard line on the final play of the game went out of the back of the end zone. Akron lead at various points during the game: 10–7 in the third quarter after a 28-yard passing touchdown from Kyle Pohl to Zach D'Orazio; and 24–21 in the fourth quarter after a one-yard pass from Pohl to Tyrell Goodman. Bowden's 2013 team showed improvement, compiling a 5–7 record on the season that included snapping the nation's longest road losing streak (28) with a 24–17 victory at Miami (OH). Akron would finish 5–7 on the season. For the signs of improvement shown by the Zips, Akron extended Bowden's contract by two years through 2017. In 2014, Bowden led the Zips to another 5–7 mark with a 3–5 record in MAC play to finish in a tie for fourth place in the MAC East Division. The Zips began the season with a 41–0 shutout of Howard. Akron then lost to Penn State by a score of 21–3. The third game of the season saw the Akron Zips lose to Marshall by a score of 48–17. The Zips would then reel off three straight wins, upsetting Pittsburgh, defeating Eastern Michigan and Miami (OH). Akron would then lose its next four, beginning with Ohio, then Bowling Green and Buffalo. Akron defeated UMass in its next-to-last game to set up an opportunity to attain bowl eligibility in its last regular season game, but the Zips lost to archrival Kent State by a score of 27–24.

In 2015, the Zips finished the season at 8–5 with a 5–3 record in MAC play to finish in a tie for second place in the MAC East Division. To kick off the season, Bowden led the Zips into Norman, Oklahoma for a showdown against one of the country's all-time college football powers, No. 10 Oklahoma. The Zips would lose by a score of 41–3. Akron would then lose to Pittsburgh the following week to start the season at 0–2. Akron would pick up its first win of the 2015 campaign the following week against Savannah State. Akron beat Louisiana-Lafayette in game four by a score of 35–14. The following week, the Zips lost to Ohio, before defeating Eastern Michigan by a score of 47–21. The Zips then lost to Bowling Green and Central Michigan before finishing the season on a five-game winning streak, defeating UMass, Miami (OH), Buffalo to attain bowl eligibility, Kent State in the regular season finale, and Utah State in the Famous Idaho Potato Bowl.

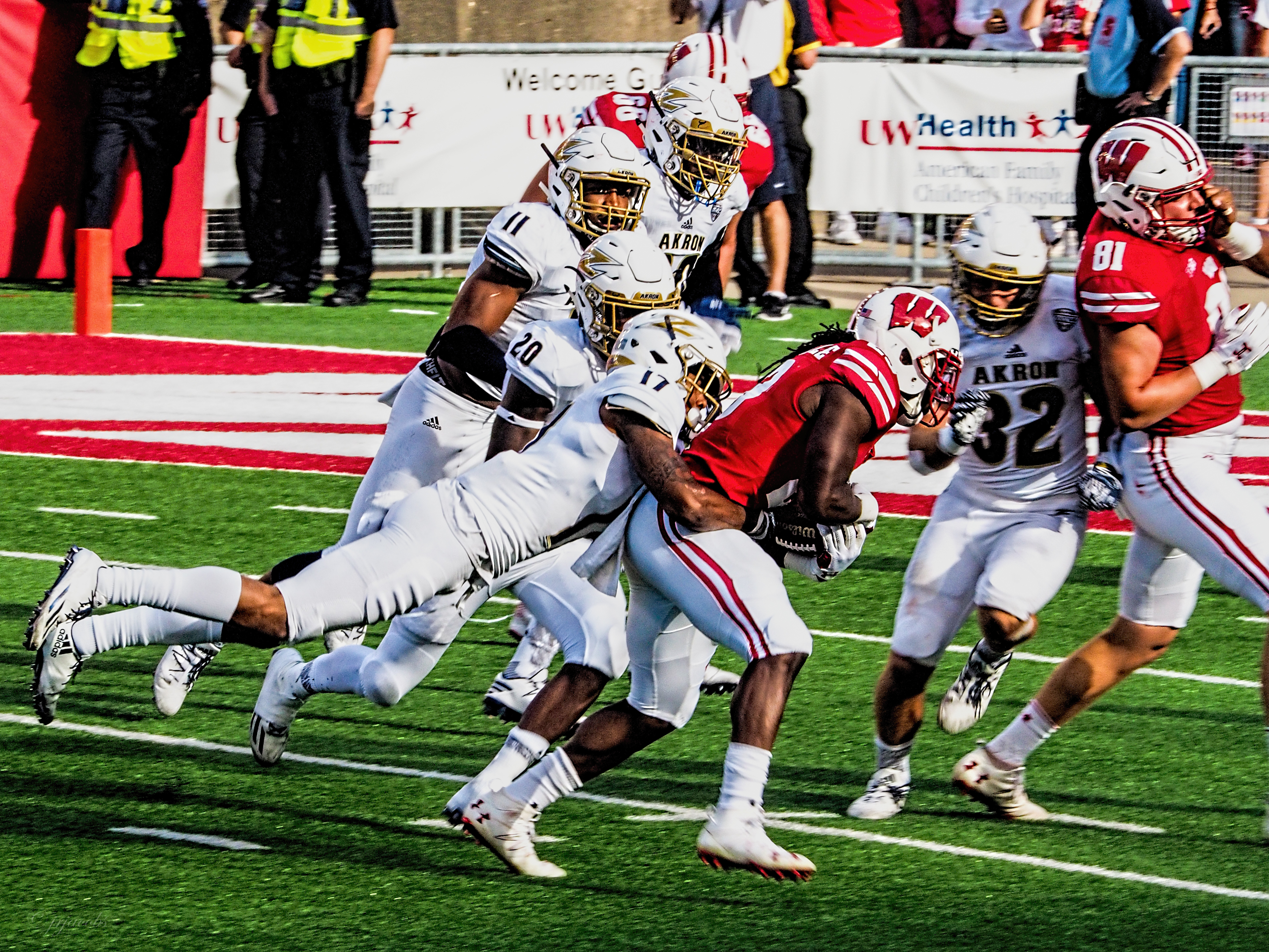
Zips defenders tackle Wisconsin running back Dare Ogunbowale during a 2016 game in Wisconsin.

Bowden led the Zips to a 5–7, 3–5 record in MAC play to finish in a tie for third place in the MAC East Division in 2016. The season began with a victory over VMI. The next week, Akron went to Madison, Wisconsin for a showdown against No. 10 Wisconsin. The Zips lost the game by a score of 54–10. Next, the Zips defeated Marshall by a score of 65–38, the most points Marshall had allowed in a football game in 25 years. The next week, Akron lost to Appalachian State before defeating Kent State and Miami (OH). After getting blanked 41–0 by No. 24 Western Michigan, the Akron Zips beat Ball State by a score of 35–25. The Zips would then lose its last four games of the season, beginning with Buffalo, then Toledo, Bowling Green and Ohio. On December 2, 2018, Bowden was relieved of his duties as head coach after 7 seasons. His final record with the University of Akron was 35–52.

=== Tom Arth era (2019–2021) ===
On December 14, 2018, Akron hired Chattanooga head coach Tom Arth as the 28th head football coach of the program. The following year, the Zips would finish win less at a record of 0–12. The University of Akron dismissed coach Tom Arth on November 2, 2021, just short of him finishing his third season. His overall record while at Akron was a dismal 3-24.

=== Joe Moorhead era (2022–present) ===
On December 4, 2021, then-Oregon offensive coordinator and former Mississippi State head coach Joe Moorhead was announced as the 29th head coach of the Akron Zips. Moorhead signed a five-year contract with the university worth $2.5 million excluding incentives.

So far during his tenure, his finishes are as follows:

2022: 2–10, 2023: 2–10, 2024: 4–8, 2025: 5–7

== Conference affiliations ==
Akron has competed both as an independent and within multiple conferences.

- Independent (1891–1914)
- Ohio Athletic Conference (1915–1936)
- Independent (1937–1947)
- Ohio Athletic Conference (1948–1965)
- NCAA College Division / NCAA Division II independent (1966–1977)
- Mid-Continent Conference (1978–1979)
- Ohio Valley Conference (1980–1986)
- NCAA Division I-A independent (1987–1991)
- Mid-American Conference (1992–present)

== Conference championships ==
=== Conference championships ===
Akron has won one conference championship, winning the 2005 MAC East Division title followed by their 31–30 victory in the 2005 MAC Championship Game.

| Season | Conference | Head coach | Overall record | Conference record |
|---|---|---|---|---|
| 2005 | Mid-American Conference | J. D. Brookhart | 7–6 | 5–3 |

=== Division championships ===
In the division era (1997–2023) of the MAC, Akron won three division championships.

| Season | Conference | Head coach | Opponent | CG result |
|---|---|---|---|---|
| 2000† | Mid-American Conference - East | Lee Owens | N/A lost tiebreaker to Marshall | |
| 2005† | Mid-American Conference - East | J. D. Brookhart | Northern Illinois | W 31–30 |
| 2017 | Mid-American Conference - East | Terry Bowden | Toledo | L 28–45 |

† Co-champions

== Bowl games ==
Akron has participated in three bowl games in its history, compiling a 1–2 record. Prior to 1987, the Zips were not a part of the Football Bowl Subdivision (formerly Division I–A). J. D. Brookhart arrived in 2004 and led the Zips to one bowl game in his six seasons as head coach, an automatic berth in the 2005 Motor City Bowl. The team has subsequently appeared in two bowl games under Terry Bowden.

| Season | Coach | Bowl | Opponent | Result |
|---|---|---|---|---|
| 2005 | J. D. Brookhart | Motor City Bowl | Memphis | L 31–38 |
| 2015 | Terry Bowden | Famous Idaho Potato Bowl | Utah State | W 23–21 |
| 2017 | Terry Bowden | Boca Raton Bowl | Florida Atlantic | L 3–50 |

== Playoff appearances ==
=== NCAA Division I-AA ===
Akron has participated in the Division I-AA playoffs once in its history, compiling a 0–1 record.

| Year | Coach | Round | Opponent | Result |
|---|---|---|---|---|
| 1985 | Jim Dennison | First Round | Rhode Island | L 27–35 |

=== NCAA Division II ===
| Year | Coach | Round | Opponent | Result |
|---|---|---|---|---|
| 1976 | Jim Dennison | Quarterfinals; Semifinals; National championship | UNLV; Northern Michigan; Montana State | W, 27–6; W, 29–26; L, 13–24 |

== Head coaches ==
The Akron Zips have had 28 head coaches throughout the program's history. With 80 victories, Jim Dennison is first overall in the program's history, followed by Gordon K. Larson (74 wins) and Gerry Faust (43).

| Name | Years | Season(s) | Record | Pct. |
|---|---|---|---|---|
| Frank Cook | 1892 | 1 | 3–4 | .429 |
| John Heisman | 1893–94 | 2 | 6–2 | .750 |
| Harry Wilson | 1896 | 1 | 0–1 | .000 |
| Archie Eves | 1899 | 1 | 2–1 | .667 |
| Forest Firestone | 1902 | 1 | 2–5 | .286 |
| Alfred W. Place | 1903 | 1 | 4–0–2 | .833 |
| Dwight Bradley | 1908 | 1 | 3–4 | .429 |
| Clarence Weed | 1909 | 1 | 4–4 | .500 |
| Frank Haggerty | 1910–14 | 5 | 22–16–3 | .573 |
| Fred Sefton | 1915–23 | 9 | 34–33–4 | .507 |
| James W. Coleman | 1924–25 | 2 | 6–10 | .375 |
| George Babcock | 1926 | 1 | 5–2–2 | .667 |
| Red Blair | 1927–35 | 9 | 42–30–5 | .578 |
| Jim Aiken | 1936–38 | 3 | 19–7–1 | .722 |
| Thomas Dowler | 1939–40 | 2 | 7–9–2 | .444 |
| Otis Douglas | 1941–42 | 2 | 5–10–3 | .361 |
| Paul Baldacci | 1946–47 | 2 | 7–10 | .412 |
| William Houghton | 1948–51 | 4 | 7–27–1 | .214 |
| Kenneth Cochrane | 1952–53 | 2 | 8–9–1 | .472 |
| Joe McMullen | 1954–60 | 7 | 30–28–3 | .516 |
| Gordon K. Larson | 1961–72 | 12 | 74–33–5 | .683 |
| Jim Dennison | 1973–85 | 13 | 80–62–2 | .563 |
| Gerry Faust | 1986–94 | 9 | 43–53–3 | .449 |
| Lee Owens | 1995–2003 | 9 | 40–61 | .396 |
| J. D. Brookhart | 2004–09 | 6 | 30–42 | .417 |
| Rob Ianello | 2010–11 | 2 | 2–22 | .083 |
| Terry Bowden | 2012–2018 | 7 | 35–52 | .402 |
| Tom Arth | 2019–2021 | 3 | 3–24 | .111 |
| Joe Moorhead | 2022–pres. | 4 | 13–35 | .271 |

Notable former assistant coaches

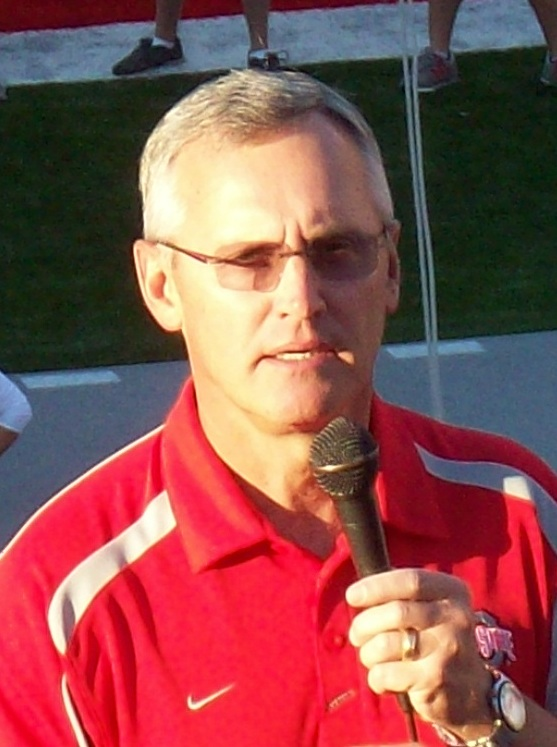
Jim Tressel, former Akron graduate assistant.

The Zips football program has had several assistant coaches who went on to make notable achievements, from longevity in their tenure as collegiate coaches to becoming head coaches at the NCAA FBS level.

- Paul Bixler – Assistant coach (1936–39)
- Terry Bowden – Assistant coach (1986)
- Jim Dennison – Assistant coach (1965–72)
- Otis Douglas - Line coach (1939–40)
- Luke Fickell – Defensive line coach (2000–01)
- Hal Hunter – Offensive line coach (1987–90)
- Jack Lengyel – Assistant coach (1959)
- Tom Reed – Defensive line coach (1969–72)
- Jim Tressel – Graduate assistant (1975–78)

== Rivalries ==
=== Buffalo ===
The Buffalo Bulls leads the series 13–12 through the 2025 season.

=== Kent State ===
Akron's biggest rival is Kent State, located 10 miles (16 km) from the Akron campus. The two schools first met in 1923 and have played 56 times through the 2013 meeting. Akron went 11–0–1 in the first 12 meetings in the series between 1923 and 1941, with no games played from 1924 to 1927 and 1937–39. Kent State started a 10-game winning streak in 1942 through 1954, though no games were played during the World War II years of 1943–45 when neither school fielded teams. After the 1954 meeting, the rivalry was scrapped due to a lack of competition. It was reinstated in 1972 and has been an annual contest since 1983. In 1992, Akron joined the MAC and the rivalry became a conference game.

Since 1946, the two teams have played for the Wagon Wheel trophy. The story goes that John R. Buchtel was searching for a site to start a new college in 1870 near what is now Kent State University when his wagon became stuck in the mud. The horses pulled the wagon apart and one of the wheels ended up being buried. Buchtel would eventually settle on a site in Akron for Buchtel College. In 1902, while digging for a pipeline in Kent, the wheel was discovered and eventually came into the possession of Kent State dean of men Dr. Raymond Manchester. It was he who suggested in 1945 that the wheel be used as a trophy for the winner of the Kent State-Akron football game.

=== Youngstown State ===
The Zips have played the Youngstown State 35 times in football. They played for the Steel Tire, named for the products that both cities were known for. In 1995, the series was discontinued with Youngstown State holding a 19–14–2 edge.

== Facilities ==
=== Rubber Bowl (1940–2008) ===
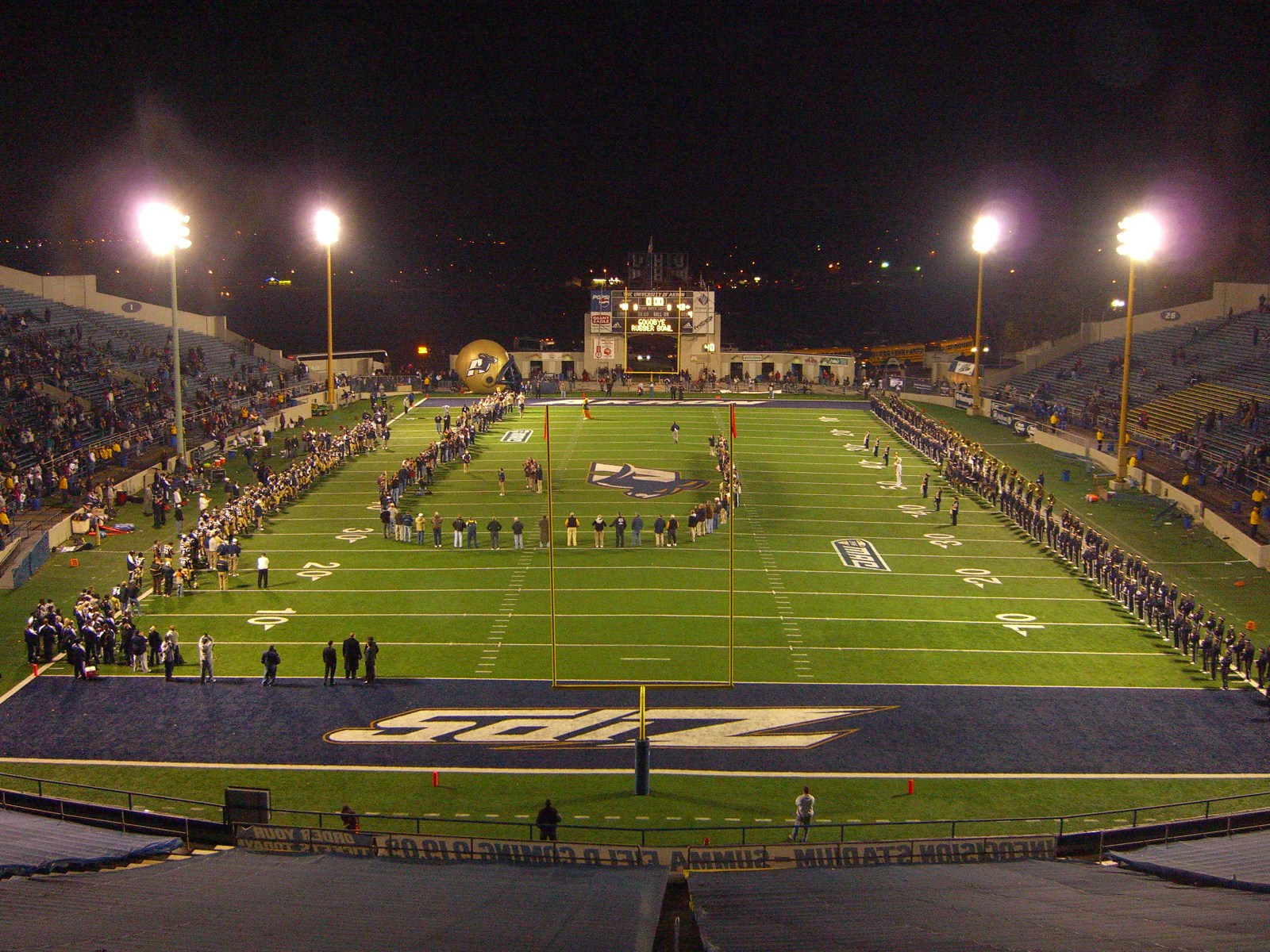
An on-field ceremony at the Rubber Bowl after the stadium's 324th and final football game on November 13, 2008.

The Akron Zips football team played their first game in the stadium on October 5, 1940, against Western Reserve (now known as Case Western Reserve University), before getting their first win in the facility November 9 of that year against rival Kent State. Prior to playing at the Rubber Bowl, the Zips football teams played at Buchtel Field, a 7,000-seat facility that opened in 1923. The Zips recorded their first sellout in the Rubber Bowl on September 30, 1961. In 1971, the university purchased the stadium for $1 from the city. An artificial surface was installed in 1983, which was replaced with AstroPlay in 2003. The Zips played 324 games at the stadium, which included their first-ever appearance on ESPN in 1986. Other notable games include the highest-scoring game in the stadium's history, a 65–62 victory over Eastern Michigan in 2001, as well as a 65–7 Akron victory over Howard University in 2003. In 2005, the Zips clinched their first Mid-American Conference East Division title and spot in the 2005 MAC Championship Game with a 35–3 win over arch-rival Kent State in that year's Wagon Wheel game. Akron would go on to win the 2005 MAC Championship with a last-second 31–30 win over Northern Illinois at Ford Field in Detroit.

In 2003, the university began exploring the feasibility of building an on-campus stadium to replace the Rubber Bowl, which was in disrepair and several miles away from campus. In 2007, plans were announced for a new stadium, later known as InfoCision Stadium – Summa Field, with work beginning in January 2008 and opening in September 2009. The final Akron Zips football game at the Rubber Bowl took place on November 13, 2008, against the Buffalo Bulls. The game was nationally televised on ESPN and featured the two teams tied for first place in the Mid-American Conference's East Division with identical 5–4 (3–2) records entering the game. Buffalo defeated the Zips 43–40 in four overtimes in front of a crowd of 18,516. For the Zips, it was both the first four-overtime game and the first overtime loss in school history. After the game, a special ceremony with current and former players and coaches was held to honor the 68-year history of the stadium.

=== InfoCision Stadium–Summa Field (2009–present) ===
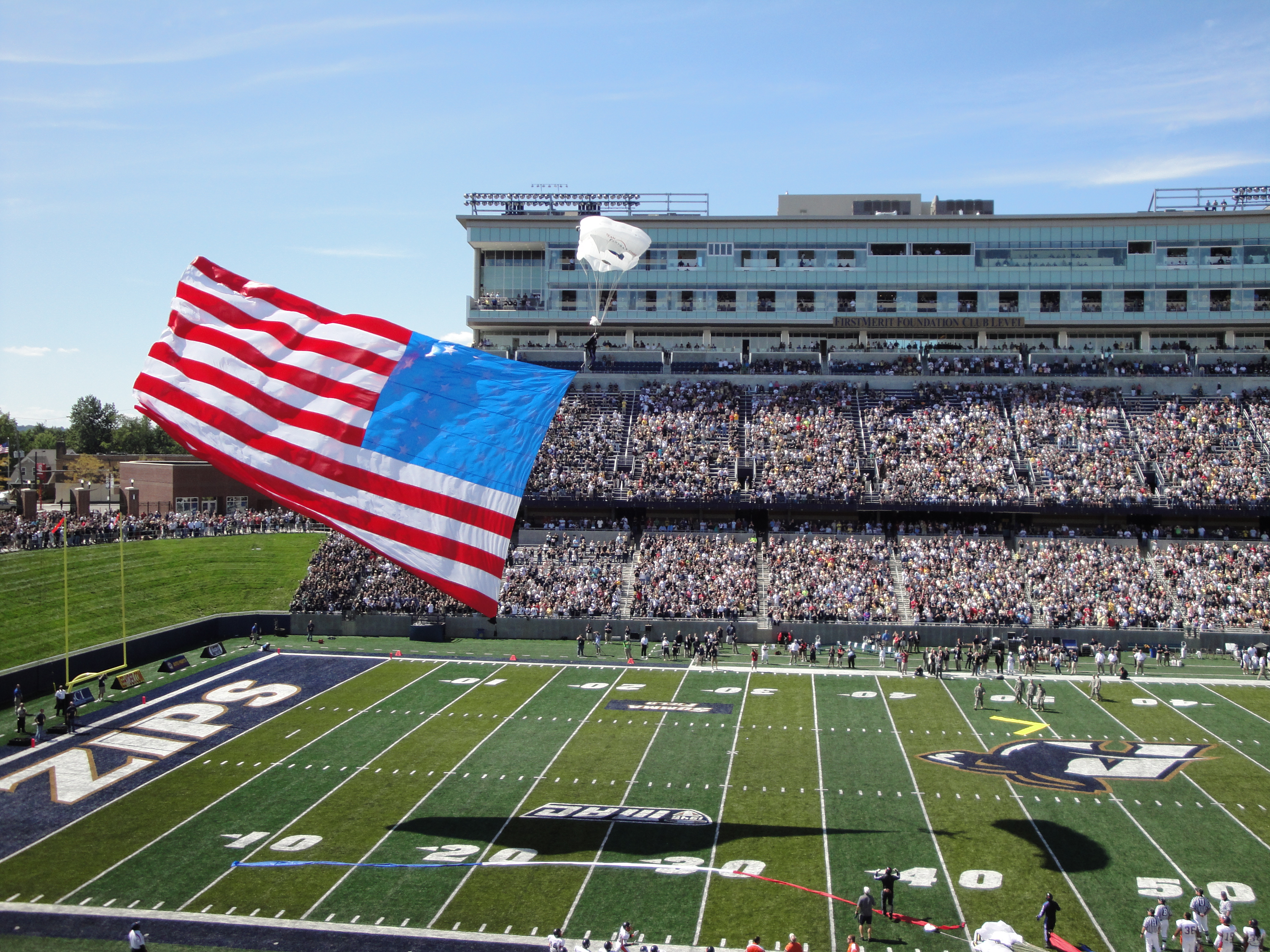
A parachuter descends with American flag in tow onto the surface of Summa Field as part of the opening day festivities.

InfoCision Stadium was constructed as part of a building initiative undergone by the University of Akron called the "New Landscape for Learning." The $300 million construction program included the construction and renovations of numerous buildings on campus, including the Buchtel College of Arts and Sciences building, an honors complex, a student recreation center, and a student union. The Rubber Bowl, the former home of the Zips football team, was located 6 miles (9.7 km) away of the Akron campus. Due to the high maintenance costs for the facility, the decision was made to construct an on-campus stadium.

To build the new stadium, several dormitories had to be demolished and the properties of local tenants were acquired using eminent domain. In order to house the displaced students, the university spent $22.6 million to purchase Quaker Square, a former Quaker Oats Company oat silo that was converted into a hotel.

The home opener of the 2009 football season marked the first game held in InfoCision Stadium. In it, the Zips defeated Morgan State 41–0. To mark the occasion, a ribbon-cutting ceremony was held to inaugurate the new stadium. Amongst those who cut the ribbon were Don Plusquellic (Mayor of Akron), Betty Sutton (member of the United States House of Representatives), and Luis Proenza (President of the University of Akron).

=== Stile Athletics Field House ===
An indoor training facility used primarily for the football team. It includes a full practice football field, extensive weight room, indoor track and offices for the football program.

== Logos and uniforms ==
In 2002, the university instituted a new athletics logo featuring the kangaroo as well as a custom font for "Akron Zips." The logo replaced the former Akron logo which featured a flying "A". The football program adapted the alternate logo for their helmets which featured an "A" and a profile view of a kangaroo. The first year of the logo change, the football helmets had the alternate logo with a navy colored oval around it. The following year, the navy oval was dropped. Additional changes that also came with the re-branding included the uniforms altered to change the yellow to gold.

== Individual accolades ==
=== All-Americans ===
A total of 51 Zips have been recognized as All-Americans by various media selectors. Among those selections, one has achieved consensus All-American status.

Akron All-Americans

| Season | Name | Pos. |
|---|---|---|
| 1940 | Mike Fernella | OT |
| 1940 | Bennie Flossie | QB |
| 1954 | John Verdon | End |
| 1958 | Ken Delaney | OT |
| 1968 | Tony Pallija | DB |
| 1968 | Don Ruff | SE |
| 1968 | Don Zeisler | QB |
| 1969 | John Travis | OG |
| 1969 | Jack Beidleman | RB |
| 1969 | Dave Holian | DT |
| 1969 | Tony Pallija | DB |
| 1969 | Dan Ruff | SE |
| 1970 | Jack Beidleman | HB |
| 1970 | Fred DeHart | LB |
| 1970 | Tom DeMarco | OT |
| 1971 | Mike Hatch | DB |

| Season | Name | Pos. |
|---|---|---|
| 1975 | Steve Cockerham | LB |
| 1975 | Glenn Evans | SE |
| 1976 | Steve Cockerham | LB |
| 1976 | Mark Van Horn | OG |
| 1976 | Glenn Evans | SE |
| 1976 | Al Hodakievic | DT |
| 1977 | Steve Cockerham | LB |
| 1977 | Jeff Jesko | OT |
| 1978 | Mike Andy | OT |
| 1978 | Herb Kohler | OG |
| 1979 | Jim Valencheck | DB |
| 1979 | Brad Reese | LB |
| 1979 | Don Schutz | OT |
| 1979 | Paul Winters | RB |
| 1980 | Brad Reese | LB |
| 1981 | Brad Reese | LB |

| Season | Name | Pos. |
|---|---|---|
| 1982 | James Black | RB |
| 1982 | Ed Grimsley | LB |
| 1982 | Dennis Heckman | PK |
| 1982 | Joe Myers | DT |
| 1982 | Tony Philpott | LB |
| 1983 | James Black | RB |
| 1983 | Brian Clark | C |
| 1983 | Clarence Kelly | DB |
| 1983 | Jeff Lake | LB |
| 1984 | Mike Clark | RB |
| 1984 | Willie Davis | WR |
| 1984 | Wayne Grant | NG |
| 1984 | Jeff Lake | LB |
| 1985 | Wayne Grant | DL |
| 1985 | Mike Clark | RB |
| 1985 | Ed Grimsley | LB |

| Season | Name | Pos. |
|---|---|---|
| 1985 | Bill Hadden | LB |
| 1985 | Russ Klaus | PK |
| 1985 | Mike Teifke | C |
| 1986 | Mike Clark | RB |
| 1986 | Chris Kelly | TE |
| 1986 | Brian Moran | DB |
| 1986 | Ron Pasquale | OT |
| 1987 | Robert Lyons | DB |
| 1988 | Bill Rudison | P |
| 1991 | Phil Dunn | LB |
| 1992 | Daron Alcorn | P/PK |
| 2000 | Dwight Smith† | S |
| 2007 | Jabari Arthur | WR |

† Consensus All-American

=== Conference award winners ===
During Akron's 20-season tenure with the Mid-American Conference, a total of 4 Zips have been recognized with superlative conference honors.

Akron Conference Award Winners

| Season | Name | Pos. | Award |
|---|---|---|---|
| 1999 | Brandon Payne | RB | MAC Freshman Player of the Year |
| 2000 | Dwight Smith | S | MAC Defensive Player of the Year |

| Season | Name | Pos. | Award |
|---|---|---|---|
| 2004 | Charlie Frye | QB | Vern Smith Leadership Award |
| 2004 | J. D. Brookhart | Head Coach | MAC Coach of the Year |

=== Retired numbers ===
Akron Zips retired numbers
| No. | Player | Pos. | Tenure | Year retired | Ref. |
| 89 | Chris Angeloff | TE | 1974–1975 | 1975 | |

== Hall of Fame inductees ==
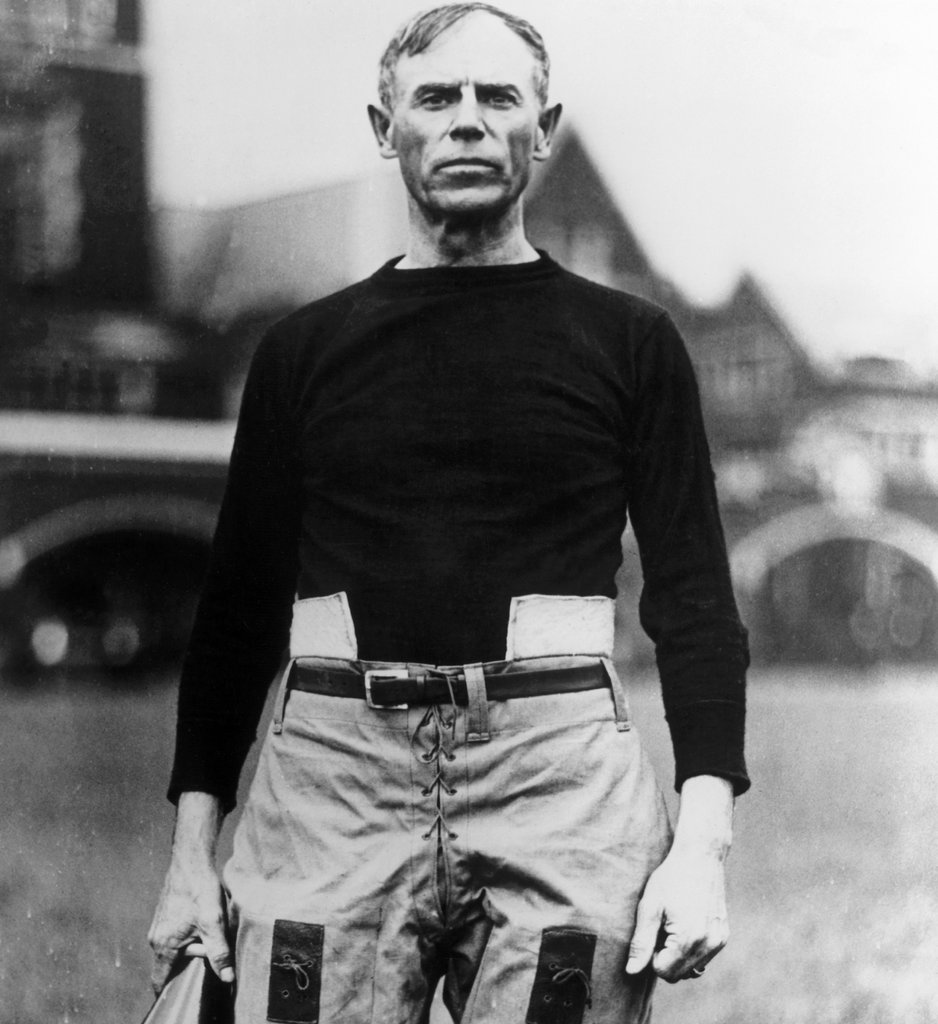
John Heisman, Akron Head Coach (1893–94)

=== College Football Hall of Fame ===
One Zip has been inducted into the College Football Hall of Fame.

| Name | Position | Years | Inducted |
|---|---|---|---|
| John Heisman | Head coach | 1893–1894 | 1954 |

=== Pro Football Hall of Fame ===
One Zip has been inducted into the Pro Football Hall of Fame.

| Name | Position | Years | Inducted |
|---|---|---|---|
| Jason Taylor | DE | 1993–1996 | 2017 |

=== University of Akron Varsity "A" Sports Hall of Fame ===
The following individuals have been inducted into the University of Akron Varsity "A" Sports Hall of Fame for their contributions to the Zips football program:

- Dave Adolph
- Jim Aiken
- Isavelt Amison
- David Arango
- Floyd Azar
- Art Bailey
- Robert Bauer
- Jack Beidleman
- Scotty Bierce
- Earl Boedicker
- Thomas Boggs
- Jim Braccio
- Dennis Brumfield
- Tony Butowicz
- Richard Case
- Michael Clark
- Kenneth Cochrane
- Steve Cockerham
- Charles Costigan
- Park Crisp
- Carl Daum
- Ken Delaney
- Tom DeMarco
- Jim Dennison
- George Deo
- Robert Dombroski
- Ollie Dreisbach
- Glenn Evans
- Mike Fernella
- Frank Fisher
- Ignatius Frolin
- Ben Flossie
- Harold Frye
- Andy Graham
- Wayne Grant
- Ray Greene
- Art Hailey
- Mike Hatch
- Robert Hatherill
- Dennis Heckman
- John Heisman
- Earl Hensal
- Al Hodakievic
- Dave Holian
- Russell Holmes
- Lee R. Jackson
- Hayes Jenkins
- Verlin Jenkins
- Lillburn Johnson
- Christopher Kelley
- Clarence Kelly
- Alan Kerkian
- Russ Klaus
- Edwin Kregenow
- Mike Krino
- John Lahoski
- Gordon K. Larson
- Frank Lomax
- Edward Lopeman
- Robert Lyons
- Andrew Maluke
- Joe Mazzaferro
- Dick Miller
- Tony Pallija
- Clarence Palmer
- Joseph Papp
- Charles Parnell
- Bradley Reese
- Frank Rockwell
- Virgil Rogers
- Marion Rossi
- Dan Ruff
- Willard Russell
- Mario Russo
- Eric Schoch
- Donald Schultz
- Roderick Scott
- Gene Scruggs
- Darrington Seals
- James Semester
- Wilson Sparkhawk
- Carl Spessard
- Bill Sturgeon
- Clarence Swigart
- Ed Toth
- John Travis
- Carl Tsaloff
- Ronald Ulrich
- Mark Van Horn
- John Verdon
- Frank Wahl
- Ralph Waldsmith
- Frank Wargo
- Paul Winters
- Frank Witwer
- Frank Zazula
- Joseph Zemla
- Guy Zimmerman
- Don Zwisler

== Records ==
=== Team records ===
- Consecutive victories
  11 (1929–30 & 1969–70)
- Margin of Victory
  62 vs. Western Reserve Acad. (1893)
- Total Offensive Yards
  In a Season: 5,643 (2003)
  In a Game: 692 vs. Howard (2003)
- Points Scored
  In a Season: 435 (2003)
  In a Regular Season Game: 65 vs. Howard (2003) & vs. Eastern Michigan (2001)
  In a Bowl Game: 31 vs. Memphis (Motor City Bowl, 2005)

=== Individual records ===
- Total Offense
  Career: Charlie Frye – 11,478 yards
  Season: Charlie Frye – 3,837 yards (2003)
  Game: Charlie Frye vs. Central Michigan – 460 yards (2003)
- Total Touchdowns Scored
  Career: Brandon Payne – 43
  Season: Dennis Kennedy (2008) – 18
  Game: Terry Cameron (1978) & Bobby Hendry (2001) – 5
- Total Touchdowns Responsible For
  Career: Charlie Frye – 83
  Season: Charlie Frye (2003) – 29
  Game: Terry Cameron (1978), Bobby Hendry (2001) & Luke Getsy (2005) – 5
- Total Points Scored (Position Players)
  Career: Brandon Payne – 260
  Season: Dennis Kennedy – 110 (2008)
  Game: Art Bailey (1958), Terry Cameron (1978) & Bobby Hendry (2001) – 30
- All-Purpose Yards
  Career: Jack Beidleman – 5,377 yards
  Season: Domenik Hixon – 2,139 yards (2005)
  Game: Jack Beidleman vs. Youngstown State – 362 yards (1969)

==== Passing ====
- Passing yards
  Career: Charlie Frye – 11,049
  Season: Charlie Frye – 3,549 (2003)
  Game: Luke Getsy – 455 vs. Memphis (2005)
- Pass completions
  Career: Charlie Frye – 913
  Season: Luke Getsy – 278 (2005)
  Game: Charlie Frye – 36 vs. Kent State (2003)
- Pass attempts
  Career: Charlie Frye – 1,436
  Season: Luke Getsy (2005) – 525
  Game: Luke Getsy – 59 vs. Memphis (2005)
- Completion Percentage
  Career: Charlie Frye – 63.6%
  Season (minimum 150 attempts): Charlie Frye – 65.8% (2002)
  Game (minimum 10 completions): Charlie Frye – 80.5% vs. Penn State (2004)
- Touchdown Passes
  Career: Charlie Frye – 64
  Season: Luke Getsy – 23 (2005)
  Game: Luke Getsy vs. Northern Illinois – 5

==== Rushing ====
- Rushing Yards
  Career: Mike Clark – 4,257
  Season: Mike Clark – 1,786 (1986)
  Game: James Black – 295 vs. Austin Peay (1983)
- Rushing Attempts
  Career: Mike Clark – 804
  Season: James Black – 351 (1983)
  Game: James Black (1983) vs. Austin Peay – 52
- Rushing Touchdowns
  Career: Brandon Payne – 39
  Season: Dennis Kennedy (2008) – 17
  Game: Terry Camerson (1978) & Bobby Hendry (2001) – 5
- 100-Yard Rushing Games
  Career: Mike Clark – 24
  Season: Mike Clark (1986) – 9

==== Receiving ====
- Receiving Yards
  Career: Jabari Arthur – 2,653
  Season: Domenik Hixon – 1,210 (2005)
  Game: Jabari Arthur – 223 vs. Western Michigan (2007)
- Receptions:
  Career: Jabari Arthur – 184
  Season: Jabari Arthur (2007) – 86
  Game: Jabari Arthur – 15 vs. Westen Michigan (2007)
- Touchdown Receptions
  Career: Dan Ruff – 27
  Season: Dan Ruff – 11 (1968)
  Game: Dan Ruff – 4 vs. Ball State (1969)
- Receiving Average Gain Per Reception
  Career (minimum 75 receptions): Dan Ruff – 19.9
  Season (minimum 30 receptions): Dan Ruff (1969) – 22.9
  Game (minimum 75 receptions): Dan Ruff vs. Ball State – 39.0

==== Defensive ====
- Tackles
  Career: Steve Cockerham – 715
  Season: Brad Reese – 221 (1980)
  Game: Brad Reese – 35 vs. Western Kentucky (1980)
- Tackles For Loss
  Career: Jason Taylor – 41.0
  Season: Bill Hadden – 19 (1985)
- Sacks
  Career: Jason Taylor – 21.0
  Season: Jason Taylor (1996) & Ken Williams (1993) – 10.0
- Interceptions
  Career: Gary Tyler – 18
  Season: Dick Miller (1937) – 13
  Game: Dick Miller vs. Baldwin Wallace (1937) – 6

==== Kicking ====
- Scoring
  Career: Robert Stein – 268
  Season: Igor Iveljic (2008) – 92
  Game: Daron Alcorn (1992), Zac Derr (2001) & Jason Swiger (2003) – 17
- Field Goals Made
  Career: Bob Dombroski – 51
  Season: Russ Klaus – 19 (1985)
  Game: Andy Graham (1979), Russ Klaus (1985) & Daron Alcorn (1992) – 5
  Longest Made: Daron Alcorn – 56 yards vs. Toledo – Holder: Jamie Harsh (1992)
- Field Goals Attempted
  Career: Daron Alcorn – 76
  Season: Russ Klaus – 29 (1985)
  Game: Daron Alcorn vs. Temple (1992) – 6 – Holder: Jamie Harsh
- Field-goal percentage
  Career (15 min. attempts): Bob Dombroski – .739
  Season (1 min. attempt): Bob Dombroski – .917 (1989)
  Game (4 min. attempts): Ryan Klaus – 1.000 vs. Bowling Green (1985)

==== Punting ====
- Punts
  Career: Andy Graham – 274
  Season: Zach Campbell – 81 (2010)
  Game: John Stec – 14 vs. Ohio State (2007)
- Total Punting Yardage
  Career: Andy Graham – 10,693
  Season: Zach Campbell – 3,061 (2010)
  Game: Bill Rudison – 613 vs. Virginia Tech (1989)
- Average Punting Yardage
  Career: Mike Hayes – 42.2
  Season: Ray Dodge – 44.9 (1948)
  Game: Daron Alcorn – 51.8 vs. Cincinnati (1992)

==== Kick Returns ====
- Kick Return Yards
  Career: Matt Carter – 1,366
  Season: Matt Carter – 867 (2002)
  Game: Matt Carter – 180 vs. Marshall (2001)
- Kick Return Yard Average
  Career: Jim Braccio – 26.2
  Season: Bryan Williams – 31.9 (2007)
  Game (2 min. attempts): David Harvey – 78.5 vs. North Texas (2006)
- Kick Returns for Touchdowns
  Career: Frank Zazula, Jim Braccio & Dan Ruff – 2
  Season: Dan Ruff – 2 (1967)

==== Punt Returns ====
- Punt Return Yards
  Career: Pat Snow – 535
  Season: Matt Cherry – 305 (2003)
  Game: Jeff Sweitzer – 133 vs. Northern Arizona (1989)
- Punt Return Yard Average
  Career: Matt Cherry – 13.3
  Season: Domenik Hixon – 17.2 (2004)
  Game (3 min. attempts): Domenik Hixon – 39.0 vs. Ball State (2004)
- Punt Returns for Touchdowns
  Career: Jeff Sweitzer & Matt Cherry – 3
  Season: Jeff Sweitzer (1989) & Matt Cherry (2003) – 2
  Game: Jeff Sweitzer – 2 vs. Northern Arizona (1989)

== Notable NFL Alumni ==
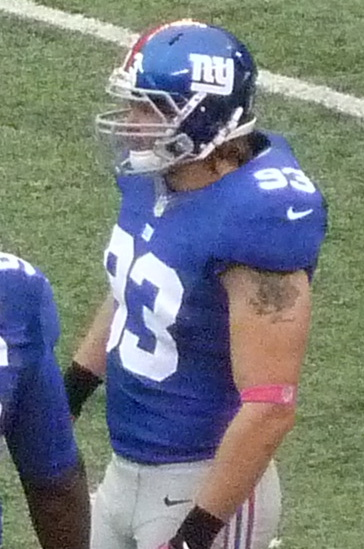
Chase Blackburn, formerly of the New York Giants and Carolina Panthers

Akron has produced a total of 10 NFL draft selections. The following "Active" and "All-Star" lists account for past and present University of Akron football players that have participated in the National Football League, the Canadian Football League, and the Arena Football League.

=== Active ===
As of December 2016, there are a total of 7 Zips listed on team rosters in the NFL, CFL, and AFL.

- Nordly Capi – LB – Arizona Cardinals
- Shawn Lemon – DL – Edmonton Elks
- Justin March-Lillard – LB – Dallas Cowboys
- Almondo Sewell – DT – Edmonton Elks

=== All-Stars ===
Among the numerous Zips that have participated in the NFL, CFL, and AFL, a total of 3 have received all-star recognition by their respective leagues.

- Daron Alcorn – K
  AFL All-Arena (1997 & 1999)
- Andre Jones – DB
  AFL All-Arena (2011)
- Jason Taylor – DE
  NFL Pro Bowl (2000, 2002, 2004, 2005, 2006, 2007)
  NFL All-Pro (2000, 2002, 2006)

=== NFL Hall of Fame Inductees ===
Jason Taylor (2017)

=== NFL draft selections ===
Akron has had 17 players selected in the NFL Draft. Daron Alcorn became the final pick of the 1993 NFL draft, a pick that has been dubbed as Mr. Irrelevant.

=== Key ===
| B | Back | K | Kicker | NT | Nose tackle |
| C | Center | LB | Linebacker | FB | Fullback |
| DB | Defensive back | P | Punter | HB | Halfback |
| DE | Defensive end | QB | Quarterback | WR | Wide receiver |
| DT | Defensive tackle | RB | Running back | G | Guard |
| E | End | T | Offensive tackle | TE | Tight end |

=== Selections ===
| Year | Round | Pick | Overall | Player | Team | Position |
|---|---|---|---|---|---|---|
| 1941 | 22 | 6 | 203 | Mike Fernella | Philadelphia Eagles | T |
| 1967 | 13 | 23 | 338 | Al Kerkian | Cleveland Browns | DE |
| 1967 | 16 | 18 | 411 | Don Williams | Dallas Cowboys | E |
| 1968 | 12 | 7 | 307 | Paul Paxton | Miami Dolphins | T |
| 1969 | 11 | 25 | 285 | Ken Delaney | Baltimore Colts | T |
| 1987 | 7 | 10 | 178 | Chris Kelley | Pittsburgh Steelers | TE |
| 1989 | 10 | 23 | 274 | John Buddenberg | Cleveland Browns | T |
| 1993 | 8 | 28 | 224 | Daron Alcorn | Tampa Bay Buccaneers | K |
| 1997 | 3 | 13 | 73 | Jason Taylor | Miami Dolphins | DE |
| 2001 | 3 | 22 | 84 | Dwight Smith | Tampa Bay Buccaneers | DB |
| 2002 | 5 | 16 | 151 | Jake Schifino | Tennessee Titans | WR |
| 2005 | 3 | 3 | 67 | Charlie Frye | Cleveland Browns | QB |
| 2006 | 4 | 33 | 130 | Domenik Hixon | Denver Broncos | WR |
| 2007 | 3 | 24 | 88 | Andy Alleman | New Orleans Saints | T |
| 2008 | 4 | 15 | 114 | Reggie Corner | Buffalo Bills | DB |
| 2016 | 5 | 36 | 175 | Jatavis Brown | San Diego Chargers | LB |
| 2019 | 6 | 34 | 207 | Ulysees Gilbert | Pittsburgh Steelers | LB |

== Future non-conference opponents ==
Announced schedules as of November 10, 2026.

| 2027 | 2028 | 2029 | 2030 | 2031 |
|---|---|---|---|---|
| at Arizona State | Lafayette | at Georgia | Sacred Heart | at Rutgers |
| at Rutgers | at Wyoming | Mercyhurst | at Cincinnati | Bucknell |
| at Colorado State | at West Virginia | James Madison | at West Virginia | |
| Maine | at Vanderbilt | at Wisconsin | at James Madison | |
