= Buchtel =

Buchtel may refer to:

- Buchtel (surname)
- Buchtel, Ohio
- Buchtel Community Learning Center, formerly known as Buchtel High School
- Buchtel College, the former name of the University of Akron, Ohio
- Buchtel College of Arts and Sciences at the University of Akron
- Buchtel(n), pastry made of yeast dough
