= Buchtel (surname) =

The surname Buchtel may refer to:

- Henry Augustus Buchtel (1847–1924), American public official and educator
- John R. Buchtel (1820–1892), American businessman and philanthropist
- Michal Buchtel (born 1986), Czech slalom canoer

== See also ==
- Buchtel (disambiguation)
