= Wagon Wheel (trophy) =

American college football trophy

- Akron Zips Kent State Golden Flashes
- Sport: Football; Basketball
- First meeting: 1923; Akron 32, Kent State 0
- Latest meeting: October 24, 2026; Kent State 35, Akron 20
- Next meeting: 2027
- Trophy: Wagon Wheel (since November 16, 1946)

Statistics
- Total meetings: 69
- All-time series: Akron leads, 37–30–2
- Trophy series: Kent State leads, 29–26–1
- Largest victory: Kent State, 47–0 (1949)
- Longest win streak: Kent State, 10 (1942–1954)
- Current win streak: Kent State, 2 (2025–present)

Locations of the University of Akron and Kent State University

The Blue and Gold Wagon Wheel, now known simply as the Wagon Wheel, is awarded to the winner of the annual college rivalries game between the Zips of the University of Akron and the Golden Flashes of Kent State University. The trophy is, as the name implies, the wheel from a horse-drawn wagon that is painted blue and gold, the school colors for both universities. It was first contested in 1946 when the rivalry resumed after World War II.

Although the two schools are in neighboring Northeast Ohio counties and are only approximately 10 miles (16 km) apart, they only played each other in football periodically since the first meeting in 1923. The rivalry was contested annually over several periods of time, but none lasted longer than nine consecutive years prior to the current run. Akron joined the Mid-American Conference in 1992, and since then, the rivalry has been played every year. Through the 2026 game, Kent State leads the Wagon Wheel series 29–26–1. Akron leads the overall series 37–30–2.

== History ==
The University of Akron and Kent State University, located approximately 10 miles (16 km) apart, first played football against each other in 1923, a 32–0 win for Akron. The two schools did not meet again until 1928 and played annually from 1928 through the 1936 game. From 1932–1935, both teams were members of the Ohio Athletic Conference, which Akron had joined in 1915 and Kent had joined in 1932. During that time period, all of the games were Akron wins except a scoreless tie in 1932. After Akron left the OAC in 1936, the series was interrupted again after the 1936 meeting and resumed in 1940 with Akron wins in 1940 and 1941 before Kent State recorded their first win in the series with a 23–6 win in 1942. World War II halted the series again as neither school fielded a team for the 1943, 1944, and 1945 seasons.

Akron rejoined the OAC in 1944 and the Wagon Wheel trophy was introduced when the series resumed in 1946. It was the idea of Raymond Manchester, the dean of men at Kent State. Manchester donated the wheel, claiming it had been discovered in Kent in 1902 during construction of a pipeline or building near the eventual site of Kent State University. He connected the wheel to both schools by creating a legend that the wheel had been part of the carriage of Akron industrialist John R. Buchtel, the main benefactor and original namesake of what is now the University of Akron (known as Buchtel College from 1872–1913). Manchester's story was that Buchtel had been near the future site of Kent State in 1870 while scouting for a site to locate a new college. Buchtel's carriage became stuck in the mud and his horses pulled it apart, with one of the wheels becoming embedded in the mud. That incident, Manchester claimed, caused Buchtel to ultimately choose Akron as the site of the new college, which opened in 1872 and eventually became the University of Akron.

While Akron went 10–0–1 in the rivalry's beginning, Kent State proceeded to win the next 10 games, including the first 9 of the Wagon Wheel series. Several of the wins were by large margins, including a 47–0 win in 1949 that stands as the largest margin of victory for either team. Prior to Kent State's 58–18 win in 1954, Akron announced the series was being discontinued as being noncompetitive.

In the 1970s, the rivalry was revived, but the teams only met occasionally as they played in different conferences and different NCAA levels. The first meeting was in 1972, which resulted in a 13–13 tie, and they met again two years later in 1974. Kent State's 51–14 win in the 1974 game capped a stretch where the Golden Flashes went 11–0–1 against the Zips and tied the overall series. Akron finally recorded their first Wagon Wheel win five years later with a 15–13 win at the Rubber Bowl and the Zips' first win over KSU since 1941. The two teams next played in 1981 and again from 1983–1990. 1991 was the last interruption in the rivalry before Akron began MAC competition the following year. Since 1992, the game has been played every year.

Beginning with the 1997 meeting, the Zips won six in a row and 11 of 13. Kent State's only wins in that span came in 2003 with a 41–38 victory at the Rubber Bowl led by Joshua Cribbs, and a 37–15 win at Dix Stadium in 2006. The 2009 game in Akron, the teams' first meeting at InfoCision Stadium – Summa Field, resulted in a 28–20 Akron win, which tied the Wagon Wheel series at 19 wins each. Since then, the series remained tied through 2019.

== Conference affiliations ==
Since 1992, both Kent State and Akron have been members of the Mid-American Conference, and when the MAC divided into divisions in 1997, both schools were placed in the East Division. From 1932–1935 and 1944–1950, both schools were members of the Ohio Athletic Conference. Akron joined the OAC in 1915 but left in 1936 only to rejoin in 1944. Kent State joined the OAC in 1932 and remained a member until joining the MAC in 1951.

In 1956, the NCAA divided its membership into two divisions: the University Division for larger schools and the College Division for smaller schools. Kent State, with other MAC schools, played in the University Division, which became Division I in 1974 and Division I-A in 1978. Akron and the OAC played in the College Division, which eventually became Divisions II and III. After leaving the OAC in 1966, the Zips played as an independent. When the NCAA changed the divisions again to create three, the Zips played one season, 1973, in Division III before moving to Division II in 1974, where they continued to compete as an independent until joining the Mid-Continent Conference for the 1978 and 1979 seasons. The following year, 1980, Akron moved to Division I-AA, and began play in the Ohio Valley Conference. In 1987, the Zips left the OVC in football and transitioned to Division I-A, becoming the first team to do so since Division I had been divided. From 1987 through the 1991 season, the Zips were again independent in football until they joined the MAC for the 1992 season.

== Game results ==
Akron victories	Kent State victories	Tie games

No.	Date	Location	Winner	Score
1	October 6, 1923	Akron, OH	Akron	32–0
2	October 20, 1928	Akron, OH	Akron	8–6
3	October 5, 1929	Akron, OH	Akron	25–0
4	October 11, 1930	Akron, OH	Akron	12–6
5	October 10, 1931	Akron, OH	Akron	12–7
6	October 22, 1932	Akron, OH	Tie	0–0
7	October 7, 1933	Kent, OH	Akron	19–6
8	October 6, 1934	Akron, OH	Akron	26–0
9	October 11, 1935	Akron, OH	Akron	3–0
10	October 9, 1936	Akron, OH	Akron	6–0
11	November 9, 1940	Akron, OH	Akron	23–7
12	November 15, 1941	Akron, OH	Akron	41–13
13	November 14, 1942	Akron, OH	Kent State	23–6
14	November 16, 1946	Kent, OH	Kent State	13–6
15	November 14, 1947	Akron, OH	Kent State	6–0
16	November 12, 1948	Akron, OH	Kent State	31–0
17	November 12, 1949	Kent, OH	Kent State	47–0
18	November 11, 1950	Akron, OH	Kent State	19–7
19	November 10, 1951	Kent, OH	Kent State	48–7
20	November 7, 1952	Akron, OH	Kent State	34–14
21	November 7, 1953	Kent, OH	Kent State	54–19
22	November 6, 1954	Akron, OH	Kent State	58–18
23	September 9, 1972	Akron, OH	Tie	13–13
24	October 26, 1974	Kent, OH	Kent State	51–14
25	September 15, 1979	Akron, OH	Akron	15–13
26	September 19, 1981	Kent, OH	Kent State	17–6
27	September 3, 1983	Akron, OH	Akron	13–6
28	September 1, 1984	Kent, OH	Kent State	24–17
29	September 14, 1985	Akron, OH	Akron	24–0
30	September 13, 1986	Kent, OH	Akron	17–7
31	September 12, 1987	Akron, OH	Kent State	27–23
32	September 10, 1988	Kent, OH	Kent State	32–12
33	September 9, 1989	Akron, OH	Akron	40–7
34	September 8, 1990	Kent, OH	Akron	38–10
35	October 10, 1992	Kent, OH	Kent State	20–16

No.	Date	Location	Winner	Score
36	September 11, 1993	Akron, OH	Akron	42–7
37	September 17, 1994	Kent, OH	Kent State	32–16
38	October 28, 1995	Akron, OH	Akron	14–6
39	October 5, 1996	Kent, OH	Kent State	32–17
40	November 8, 1997	Akron, OH	Akron	45–35
41	October 10, 1998	Kent, OH	Akron	45–16
42	November 13, 1999	Akron, OH	Akron	37–34
43	November 18, 2000	Kent, OH	Akron	34–6
44	September 29, 2001	Akron, OH	Akron	14–10
45	November 23, 2002	Kent, OH	Akron	48–10
46	August 28, 2003	Akron, OH	Kent State	41–38
47	September 23, 2004	Kent, OH	Akron	24–19
48	November 24, 2005	Akron, OH	Akron	35–3
49	September 30, 2006	Kent, OH	Kent State	37–15
50	September 22, 2007	Akron, OH	Akron	27–20
51	October 4, 2008	Kent, OH	Akron	30–27
52	November 7, 2009	Akron, OH	Akron	28–20
53	October 9, 2010	Kent, OH	Kent State	28–17
54	November 12, 2011	Akron, OH	Kent State	35–3
55	November 3, 2012	Kent, OH	Kent State	35–24
56	November 2, 2013	Akron, OH	Akron	16–7
57	November 28, 2014	Kent, OH	Kent State	27–24
58	November 28, 2015	Akron, OH	Akron	20–0
59	October 1, 2016	Kent, OH	Akron	31–27
60	November 21, 2017	Akron, OH	Akron	24–14
61	October 20, 2018	Kent, OH	Akron	24–23
62	October 12, 2019	Akron, OH	Kent State	26–3
63	November 17, 2020	Kent, OH	Kent State	69–35
64	November 20, 2021	Akron, OH	Kent State	38–0
65	October 22, 2022	Kent, OH	Kent State	33–27
66	November 1, 2023	Akron, OH	Akron	31–27
67	November 19, 2024	Kent, OH	Akron	38–17
68	November 11, 2025	Akron, OH	Kent State	42–35^{OT}
69	October 24, 2026	Kent, OH	Kent State	35–20
Series: Akron leads 37–30–2

== Wagon Wheel Challenge ==
In 2011, the two schools began the Wagon Wheel Challenge, which counts all athletic contests in the sports where they compete head-to-head. Initially, the challenge involved 15 sports, but was reduced to 14 from 2015 to 2019 after Akron eliminated their baseball program. Following the reinstatement of Akron's baseball team and the addition of women's lacrosse at Akron in 2019, the challenge grew to 16 sports, but was reduced back to 14 after UA discontinued its men's cross country, men's golf, and women's tennis teams in 2020. From 2011 to 2015, through a sponsorship agreement with PNC Financial Services it was known as the "PNC Wagon Wheel Challenge". Beginning in 2016, it became sponsored by Crystal Clinic Orthopaedic Center. Each sport is worth one point, awarded to the winning team. In sports with multiple meetings per season, whichever team wins the most games takes the full point. If the teams split the season's meetings, each school gets a half-point. For sports that only compete against each other as part of the conference championship meet, such as cross country, golf, and track and field, whichever team finishes higher in the championship meet is awarded the point. Games in the respective conference tournaments can also factor in to which school receives the point if the teams split their regular-season meetings, with the conference tournament meeting acting as a deciding game. Through the 2024–25 season, Kent State leads the challenge 8–6. Kent State took victory in the first four seasons, followed by Akron in the next five, including the abbreviated 2019–20 season, and Kent State won the next four.

Legend
Akron victories	Kent State victories	Ties	Not contested

Academic Year	Winner	Total score	Baseball (Note: Baseball was discontinued at UA after the 2014–15 season; resumed in 2019–20)	Men's basketball	Women's basketball	Men's cross country (Note: Men's cross country was discontinued at UA after the 2019–20 season; resumed in 2023-24)	Women's cross country	Football	Men's golf (Note: Men's golf was discontinued at UA after the 2019–20 season)	Women's golf	Women's soccer	Softball	Men's track and field (indoor)	Women's track and field (indoor)	Men's track and field (outdoor)	Women's track and field (outdoor)	Women's volleyball	Women's lacrosse (Note: Women's lacrosse added by Kent State in the 2018–19 season; added at UA in 2019–20)
2011–12	Kent State	9–6	3–1	3–0	1–1	KSU	UA	KSU	KSU	KSU	KSU	2–0	UA	KSU	UA	KSU	1–1	
2012–13	Kent State	8–7	3–0	2–1	2–0	UA	UA	KSU	KSU	KSU	KSU	2–0	UA	KSU	UA	KSU	2–0	
2013–14	Kent State	8.5–6.5	3–1	1–1	2–0	UA	UA	UA	KSU	KSU	KSU	2–0	UA	KSU	UA	KSU	2–0	
2014–15	Kent State	8–7	2–1	2–1	2–0	UA	KSU	KSU	KSU	KSU	KSU	2–1	UA	UA	UA	UA	2–0	
2015–16	Akron	7.5–6.5		1–1	2–0	UA	KSU	UA	KSU	KSU	KSU	2–1	UA	UA	UA	UA	2–0	
2016-17	Akron	7.5–6.5		2–1	2–0	UA	UA	UA	KSU	KSU	KSU	2–1	UA	UA	UA	UA	1–1	
2017–18	Akron	7.5–6.5		1–1	1–1	UA	UA	UA	KSU	KSU	KSU	2–1	KSU	UA	UA	UA	1–1	
2018–19	Akron	7.5–6.5		1–1	2–0	UA	UA	UA	KSU	KSU	KSU	2–0	UA	UA	UA	UA	2–0	
2019–20	Akron	5–4	(Note: Scheduled contests for baseball, softball, men's and women's golf, men's and women's outdoor track and field, and women's lacrosse canceled due to COVID-19 pandemic)	1–1	2–0	UA	UA	KSU			KSU		UA	UA			1–1	
2020–21	Kent State	8–6	3–1	2–0	1–0		UA	KSU		KSU	1–1	4–0	UA	UA	UA	KSU	2–0	1–1
2021–22	Kent State	8–6	2–2	2–1	2–0		UA	KSU		KSU	KSU	2–1	UA	UA	KSU	UA	2–0	1–1
2022–23	Kent State	11.5–2.5	4–0	2–1	2–0		KSU	KSU		KSU	KSU	2–1	KSU	KSU	UA	UA	1–1	2–0
2023–24	Kent State	8.5–6.5	3–0	3–0	2–0	UA	UA	UA		KSU	KSU	1–1	KSU	KSU	UA	KSU	2–0	KSU
2024–25	Akron	9.5–5.5	2–1	2–0	2–0	UA	UA	UA		KSU	KSU	2–0	UA	UA	UA	KSU	1–1	UA
2025–26				2–0	2–0	UA	UA	KSU			KSU						KSU	

== See also ==
- List of NCAA college football rivalry games
