= Buchtel College of Arts and Sciences =

American college in Ohio

Buchtel College of Arts and Sciences is the largest college of the University of Akron, located in Akron, Ohio.

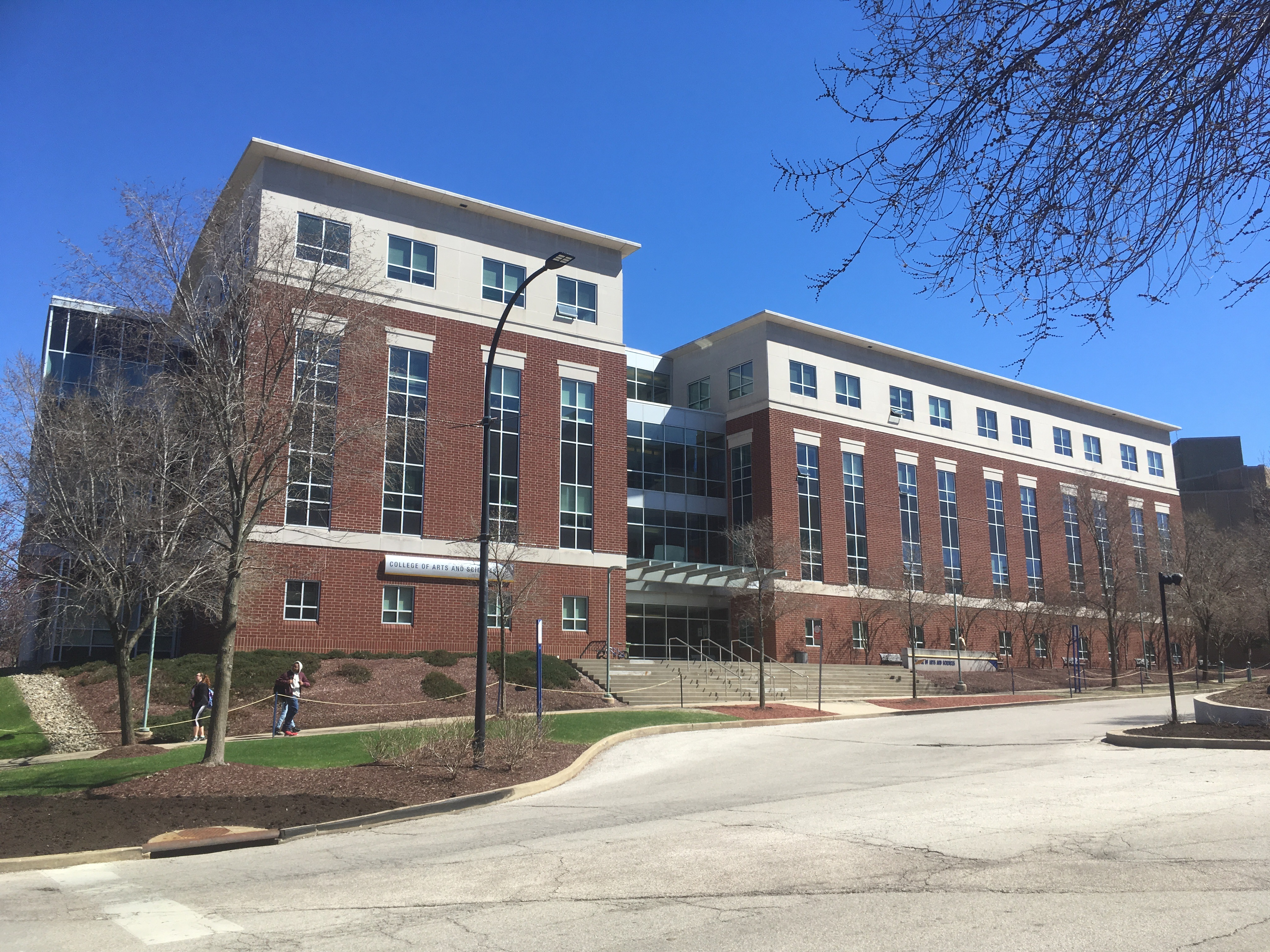
College of Arts and Sciences from the steps of the Honors College

== History ==
The Buchtel College of Arts and Sciences traces its origins back to 1870 with Buchtel College, which was the progenitor to the University of Akron. It is named after John R. Buchtel.

== Academic programs ==
The college offers more than 30 undergraduate majors, over 20 master's degrees, and 4 doctoral programs.

Also within the Buchtel College of Arts and Sciences is the Ray C. Bliss Institute of Applied Politics, which is directed by John C. Green.

== Notable people ==
- Henrietta G. Moore (1844–1940), trustee
