= Henrietta G. Moore =

American Universalist minister, educator, suffragist, and temperance worker (1844–1940)

Rev. Henrietta G. Moore
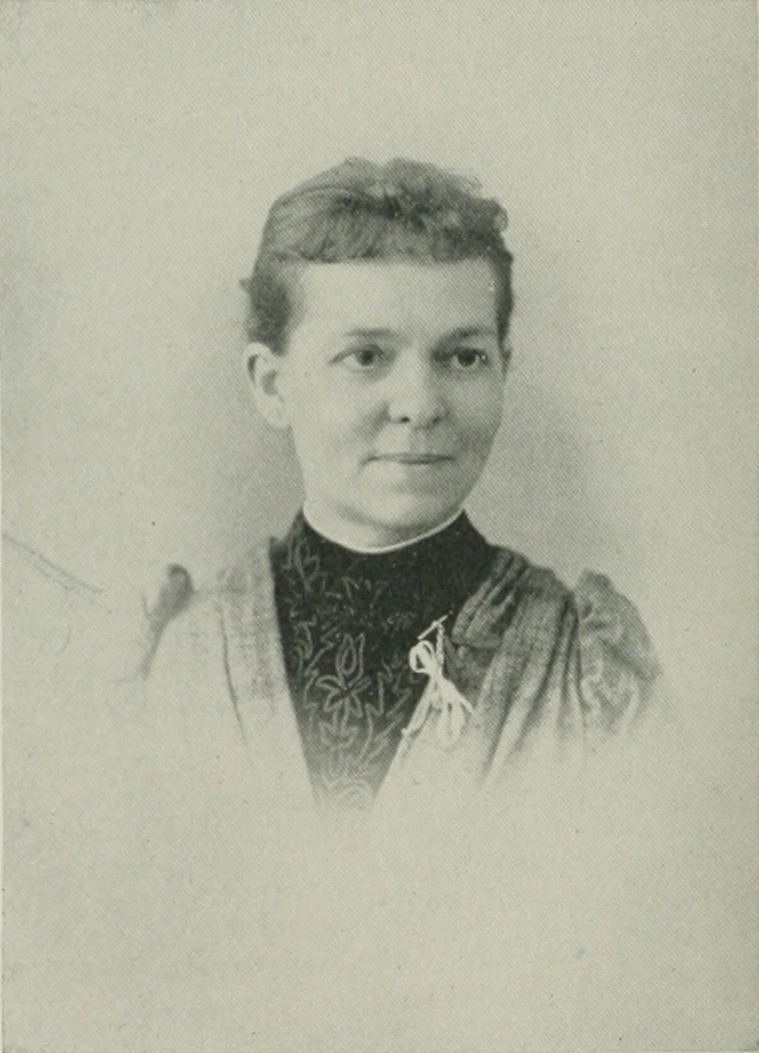
- Portrait from A Woman of the Century
- Born: Henrietta Greer Moore; September 2, 1844; Newark, Ohio, U.S.
- Died: February 28, 1940; Los Angeles, California, U.S.
- Occupations: Universalist minister; educator; suffragist; temperance activist

Henrietta G. Moore (1844–1940) was an American Universalist minister and educator, active in the temperance, and suffrage causes. For a number of years, she was engaged in educational work, and then took up the temperance crusade movement. She was one of the most successful of the many lecturers brought out by the temperance reform movement, organizing throughout the U.S. and Canada. In 1891, she was regularly ordained a minister of the Universalist church by the Ohio universalist convention in Columbus, becoming one of the most widely known of the women preachers in the U.S. She was prominently identified with the Prohibition Party.

== Early life and education ==
Henrietta Greer Moore was born in Newark, Ohio, September 2, 1844. Her parents were Oliver Perry and Lucinda Denton (Parsons) Moore. Her ancestry was of mixed English, Irish and Scotch. Many of her ancestors were prominent persons in the three kingdoms. Reginald Moore, a nephew of Queen Elizabeth, was Secretary of State and Lord Chief Justice of England under her and was by King James raised to the peerage and created Earl of Drogheda. His brother came to the colony of New York under a large land grant from Charles II, and, marrying the sister of Governor Richard Nicolls, established the family in America. Dr. Benjamin Moore, second bishop of the Protestant Episcopal Church, Dr. Moore, president of the Columbia Theological Seminary, and President Moore, of Columbia College, were of the immediate descendants. Her mother's family was of the Clan Murray and the house of McCarter, of Scotland. Upon both sides were revolutionary patriots, and all were conspicuous pioneer Baptists.

In her infancy, her parents removed to Cincinnati, and later to Morrow, Ohio, on the Little Miami River.

She was educated in the public schools of Morrow. She also received some private tutoring.

== Career ==
When she was 15 years old, she began to teach school, family troubles in financial ways making self-support a necessity. For 12 years she worked as an educator, the last seven as a principal of a grammar school.

In its early days, Moore became interested in the Women's Crusade temperance movement, which began in Ohio in 1873. Her vigorous work in the crusade brought her at once to the front. She enforced the religious plea in the work, but she stood also for the enforcement of the existing law, which was practically prohibitory. She aroused the enmity of those devoted to the liquor interest, and circumstances rendered it expedient that she should prosecute a leading and influential man for libelous charges in reference to the work. She was ably defended through a wearisome and long-drawn trial by leading lawyers, who, however, had no sympathy with any temperance move, but, with all the odds heavily against her, she won her case. That experience proved to be an educator, bringing her by rapid steps to ground gained much more slowly by her coadjutors. She learned that law alone was powerless, that behind it must be an enforcing power, and thus she was a pioneer in recognition of and cooperation with the party pledged to the destruction of the liquor traffic.

"I have lost friends and positions because of my suffrage views, but suffrage was such a basic idea with me from the beginning of my life that it never really cost me any effort or required any courage for me to stand for it against all opposition." (Henrietta G. Moore, 1918)

When the movement had transformed into the Woman's Christian Temperance Union (WCTU), Moore was made corresponding secretary of the Ohio Union. Soon after, her services as national organizer were called for, and she gave up school work. She was one of the first women to deal with the difficulties of travel in the Territories, enduring long and wearisome journeys on railroad lines, and going the second time west of the Sierra Nevada. During the years 1885–95, she estimated that she had traveled approximately 150,000 miles (240,000 km), visiting every State and Territory of the U.S., and nearly all of the provinces of Canada, and had delivered about 3,200 lectures in the interests of temperance and woman suffrage.

From 1887, for a number of years, Moore made her home at Springfield, Ohio, residing there with her mother.

Although by early training a Presbyterian, Moore held a minister's license in the Universalist Church, being regularly ordained to the ministry of that denomination at the annual Ohio Universalist Convention held at Columbus, Ohio on June 4, 1891. She held two pastorates, being for 13 years pastor of the Church of the Good Shepherd (Universalist), at Springfield, Ohio, and organizing the Church of Divine Love (Universalist), at Dayton, Ohio, where a chapel was built to house the congregation and the various departments of the church work. For many years, she served as a member of the Woman's Universalist Missionary Association.

In Springfield, Moore entered much into the civic life of the city. In April 1895, she was the first and only woman to be elected a member of the Springfield School Board. She was nominated on a straight Prohibition ticket, endorsed by the Populists, and won over two male candidates by a large majority in an intensely Republican ward.

Also in 1895, she was appointed temporary chair of the Ohio Prohibition State Convention, held at Springfield on June 11–12, in recognition of her work as a pioneer in Prohibition party work in the State. She was the first woman ever chosen to fill such a position. As temporary chair, she delivered the keynote speech, which was afterward published and widely circulated.

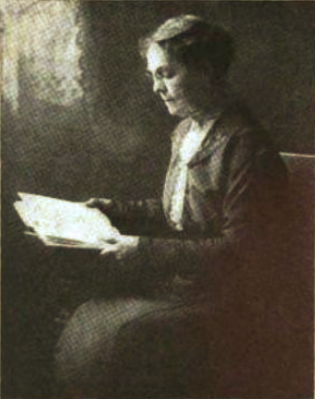
(The Woman Citizen, 1918)

In 1896, Moore and Laura Gregg Cannon of Kansas, visited 18 towns and cities in the interest of the Ohio State Woman Suffrage Association and formed numerous organizations. In 1931, for their role in suffrage and peace advocacy, Carrie Chapman Catt shared the prize money from her Pictorial Review Achievement Award with Moore and nine other women.

Moore was a trustee of the American Temperance University (Harriman, Tennessee , 1893), and of Buchtel College (Akron, Ohio), which was founded by the Ohio Universalist Convention in 1870.

She served as president of three organizations: the Woman's Universalist Missionary Alliance of Ohio (1913), the executive board of the Woman's National Universalist Missionary Association, and of the Equal Suffrage Club of Springfield, Oho.

== Personal life ==
Later in life, she removed to Pasadena, California. In 1931, she was bedridden with a broken hip. Henrietta Greer Moore died in Los Angeles, California, on February 28, 1940.

The Library of Congress holds some of Moore's documents.
