= University of Akron =

Public university in Akron, Ohio, US

The University of Akron
- Former names: Buchtel College (1870–1913); Municipal University of Akron (1913–1966)
- Motto: Fiat Lux (Latin)
- Motto in English: Let there be light
- Type: Public research university
- Established: 1870; 156 years ago
- Parent institution: University System of Ohio
- Academic affiliations: USU; Space-grant
- Endowment: $235.3 million (2020)
- President: Robert J. Nemer
- Faculty: 1,032 (2022)
- Students: 15,318 (fall 2025)
- Undergraduates: 9,912 (fall 2025)
- Postgraduates: 1,823 (fall 2025)
- Location: Akron, Ohio, United States; 41.0752°N 81.5115°W
- Campus: Urban, 218 acres (0.88 km^{2})
- Colors: Blue & gold
- Nickname: Zips
- Sporting affiliations: NCAA Division I FBS – MAC
- Mascot: Zippy the Kangaroo
- Website: uakron.edu

The University of Akron is a public research university in Akron, Ohio, United States. It is part of the University System of Ohio. As a STEM-focused institution, it focuses on industries such as polymers, advanced materials, and engineering. It is classified among "R2: Doctoral Universities – High research activity".

The University of Akron offers about 200 undergraduate and more than 100 graduate majors and has an enrollment of approximately 15,000 students. The university's School of Polymer Science and Polymer Engineering is housed in a 12-story reflective glass building near downtown Akron on the western edge of the main campus. UA's Archives of the History of American Psychology is an affiliate of the Smithsonian Institution.

The university has one branch campus: Wayne College in Orrville, Ohio. In addition, the university hosts nursing programs in affiliation with Lorain County Community College.

== History ==
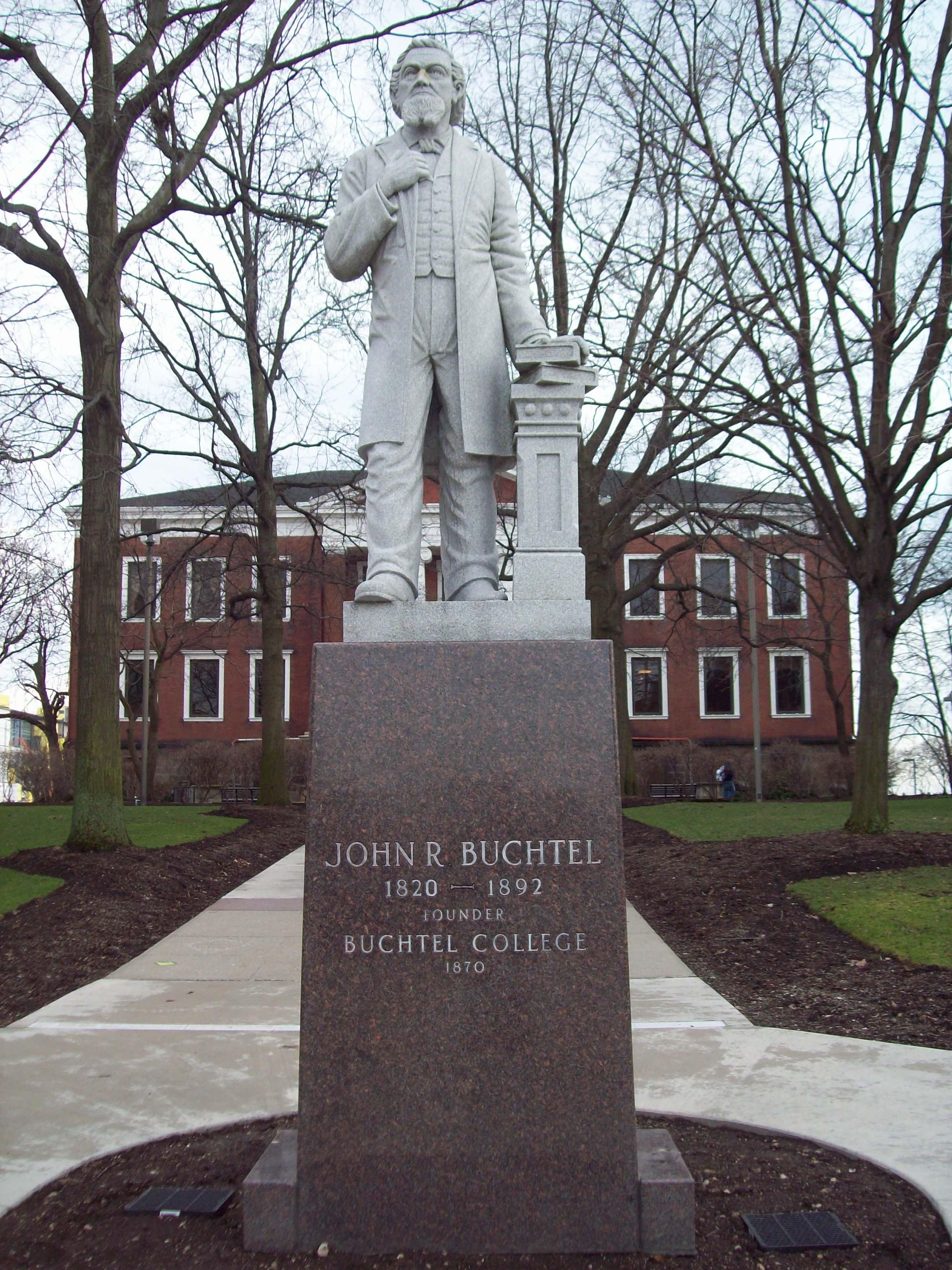
John R. Buchtel, in front of Buchtel Hall

=== Buchtel College ===
In 1867, at the annual convention of the Universalist Church of the state of Ohio, the Committee on Education expressed an interest in founding a college compatible with Universalist religious principles. It was announced that the location would be given to those who could find an appropriate location and also supply $60,000 for the college. John R. Buchtel, a prominent Akron businessman and Universalist, promptly contributed $25,000 to the endowment fund and $6,000 to the building fund. This led other Akronites to donate, setting the goal and securing Akron as the location for Buchtel College, named after its greatest supporter. John R. Buchtel continued to be the college's most significant contributor, giving $500,000 over his lifetime, approximately equivalent to $16 million today. When the university opened in 1872 it was a single-building campus, housed in what is now known as "Old Buchtel." George Washington Crouse donated $10,000 of the $20,000 needed to build a new gymnasium, completed in 1888. It was named Crouse Gymnasium in his honor, and was known as "the finest gym west of the Alleghenies."

Tragedy struck the small college on December 20, 1899, when Old Buchtel burned to the ground. Insurance only covered $65,000 of the estimated $100,000 in loss. While new campus buildings were being constructed, the Crouse Gymnasium was divided into seven classrooms and served as the college until a new Buchtel Hall was opened in 1901. The new Buchtel Hall, which itself was gutted by fire in 1971, survives to this day but had some blackening on the exterior up until a 2011 restoration.

=== 20th century ===
In 1907, the college shed its Universalist affiliation and became a non-denominational institution, in order to be able to receive funds from the Carnegie Foundation, which would not give funds to religiously affiliated schools. In 1913, Buchtel College trustees transferred the institution and its assets to the city of Akron, and Buchtel College became the Municipal University of Akron. At this time, the enrollment was 198 students. Tax money levied for the school and Akron's growing population led to strong growth for the university. Over the next several decades the university continued to add new buildings to accommodate its growing student population, acquiring more land through purchases and donations. In 1963, Governor Jim Rhodes approved the university as a state-assisted institution. Enrollment in 1964 was 10,000 students. In 1967, it fully became a state university, providing its current name as The University of Akron. In 2015, 25,117 students were enrolled at the University of Akron.

=== Construction, dropping enrollment, and lay-offs ===
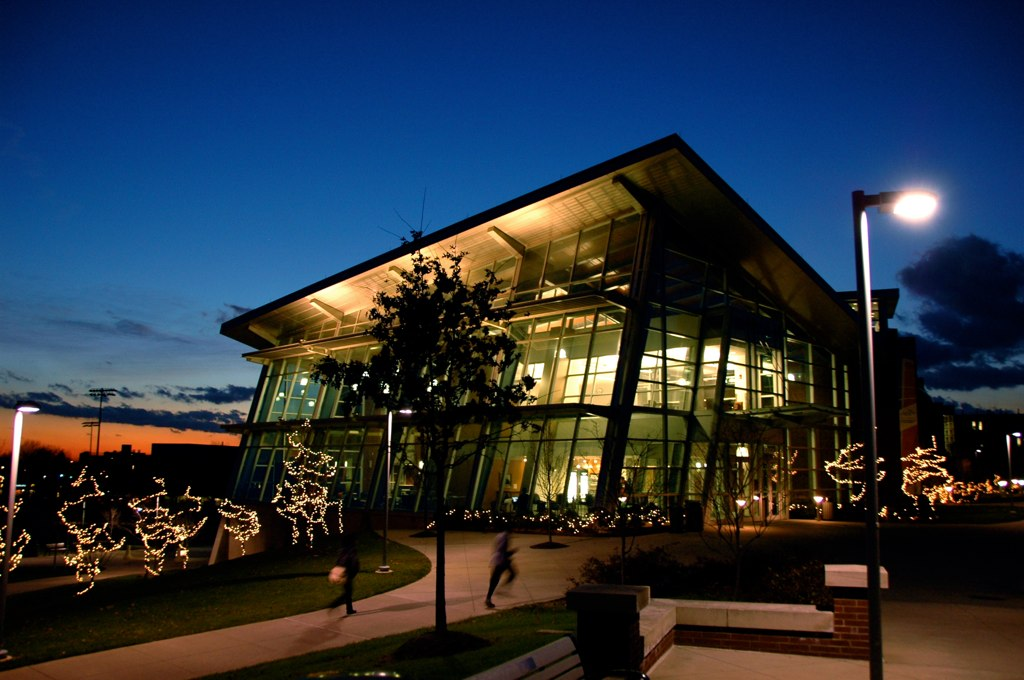
University of Akron's student union at night

During the tenure (1999-2014) of its 15th president, Luis M. Proenza, the University of Akron underwent a $627 million construction project, called "A New Landscape for Learning." A new football stadium, InfoCision Stadium-Summa Field, was also constructed on campus. The new stadium opened for its first game on September 12, 2009. The stadium replaced the Rubber Bowl, which is 3 miles (4.8 km) from campus and was built in 1940.

The university purchased the Quaker Square Crowne Plaza Hotel and shopping complex and uses it as a residence hall space. The university did a land-swap with the city of Akron so that the city may find a new downtown hotel. This means the University of Akron campus is made up of 82 buildings on 222 acres (0.90 km^{2}) near downtown Akron with a total property value of $1.84 billion.

In 2015, the university eliminated over 200 positions as the result of a $6 million budget deficit. Subsequently, in May 2016, Moody's Investors Service, downrated the university's bonds from stable to negative, because of low enrollment and high debts and pension burdens. Moody's upgraded the university's outlook to stable in 2018, citing improved enrollment, rising donations and steps to reduce expenses. Still, between 2011 and 2020 the university's enrollment went down almost 40 percent, from 25,190 in 2011 to 15,385 in 2020.

On October 1, 2019, Gary Miller became Akron's 18th president; formerly the chancellor of University of Wisconsin–Green Bay, he was given a five-year contract with a base salary of $475,000, with an annual $25,000 in a deferred compensation plan, monthly stipends of $3,500 and $750 for housing and a car, and $36,000 for moving expenses. In May 2020, president Miller announced that the university will consolidate its eleven academic colleges into five due to budget issues resulting from the COVID-19 pandemic; the cut is meant to reduce administrative costs, and "the plan does not cut or change any degree program offerings." The "redesign", as Miller called it, was termed a "bloodbath" by the faculty union president, and would eliminate "97 full-time professors out of about 570"; the union commented that "names were selected regardless of rank or tenure status". One study suggested that "women and professors of color were laid off at a disproportionate rate". After earlier layoffs and faculty taking early retirement, that added up to a loss of almost a quarter of the university's faculty since the start of the pandemic.

The university's chapter of the American Association of University Professors had advocated the university also consider cuts to athletics and leave NCAA Division I, which had lost $215 million during that decade, but the university said it would cut only $4.4 million from athletics. The Chronicle of Higher Education reported in August 2022 that thirty-six of the professors who had been fired were hired back by the university, but as adjuncts, with a similar workload and lower pay--in one case, at $18,000 a year, one-third of their former salary. In 2021, the Board of Trustees extended President Miller's contract, praising him for "consistent and decisive leadership". They increased the annual deferred compensation to $40,000, promised additional bonuses for 2025-2027 for a total of $107,000 if he remained on the job, and increased his housing and car stipends to $4,000 and $1,000, respectively.

=== Relationship with tire and rubber industry ===
The tire and rubber industry and the University of Akron have an overlapping history. Historically, several rubber corporations, such as Goodyear, Firestone, General Tire and Rubber Company, and Goodrich, had their headquarters in Akron. In 1909, the world's first courses in rubber chemistry were offered at the university. The university is also credited with featuring the first College of Polymer Science and Polymer Engineering in the world, which was founded in 1988.

== Academics ==
Academic rankings

National
- U.S. News & World Report: 373 (tie)
- Washington Monthly: 423
- WSJ/College Pulse: > 600

Global
- ARWU: Not Ranked
- U.S. News & World Report: 1226 (tie)

The University of Akron offers both undergraduate and graduate degrees, ranging from certificate to doctoral programs. Bierce Library is the main campus library, named for Lucius V. Bierce, an American Civil War-era General whose personal library constituted the first collection of the University Libraries.

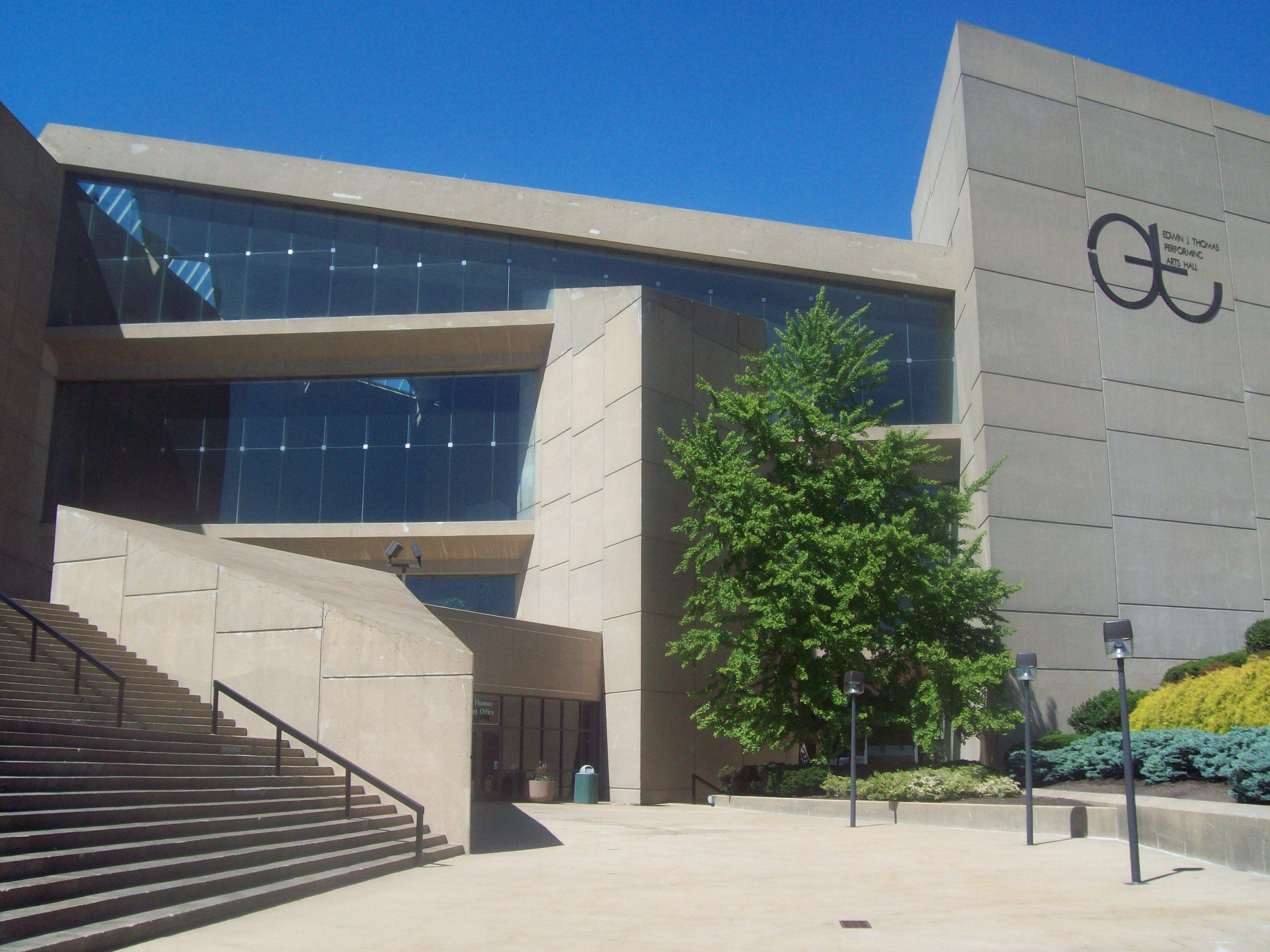
E. J. Thomas Performing Arts Hall

The University of Akron comprises the following colleges, schools, and campuses:

- Buchtel College of Arts and Sciences
- College of Business
- College of Engineering and Polymer Science
- College of Health and Human Sciences
- The Graduate School
- School of Law
- Williams Honors College
- Wayne College

The university offers about 200 undergraduate majors. In conjunction with the Northeast Ohio Medical University (NEOMED), the university offers an Early Assurance Pathway to the NEOMED MD program. The University of Akron is also the first and only university in the nation to offer a baccalaureate program in corrosion engineering.

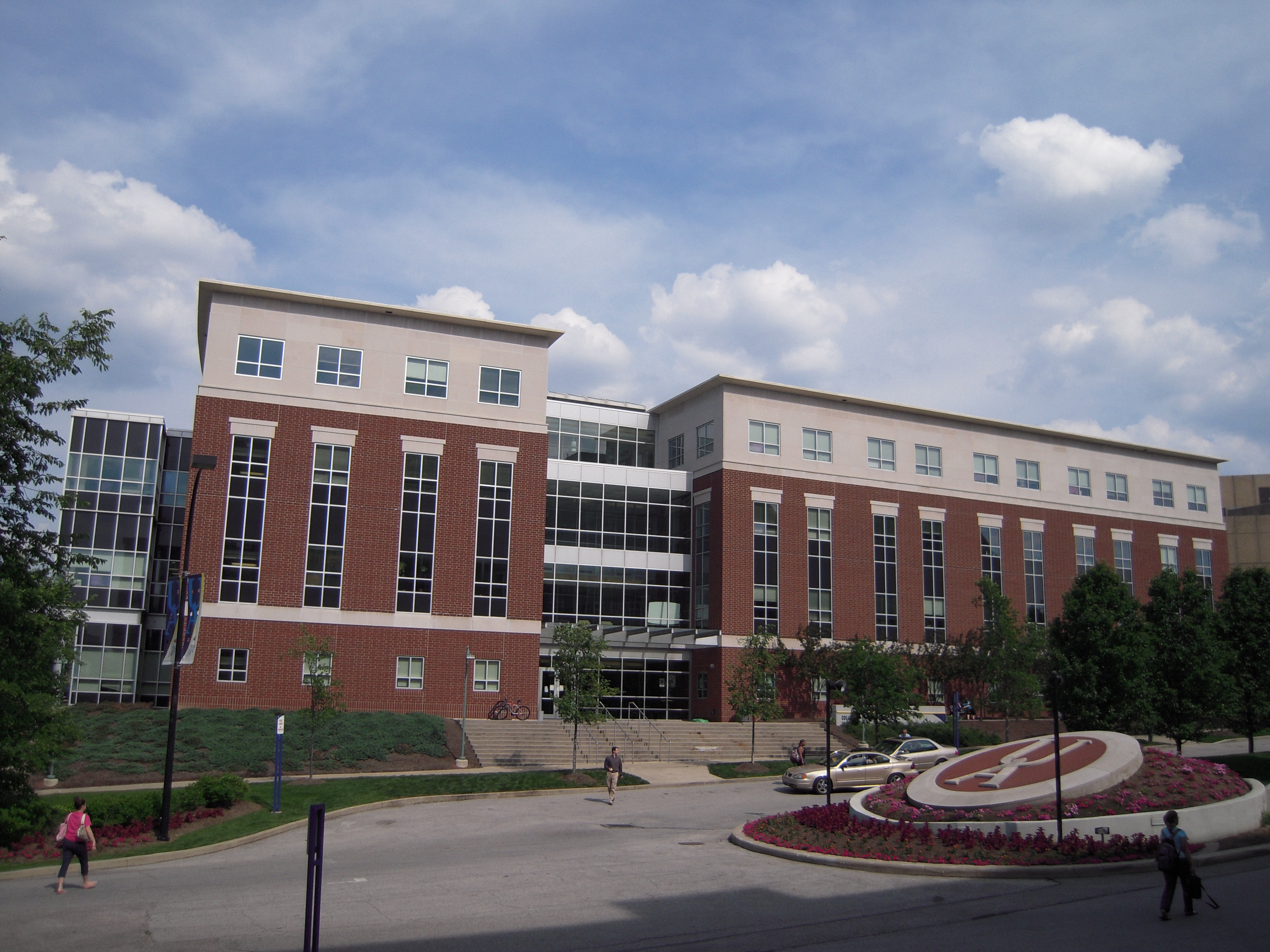
Buchtel College of Arts and Sciences

The University of Akron Honors College students earn degrees from any of the four-year accredited colleges in the university while receiving special advisement and having the opportunity to live in the Honors Complex, a resident hall exclusively for honors students. The university announced on February 3, 2016, that the college was renamed in honor of Dr. Gary B. and Pamela S. Williams.

The University of Akron currently offers more than 105 graduate degrees to approximately 2,000 graduate students. The graduate schools at the University of Akron variously offer the Master's degree, PhD, J.D., and LL.M., among others. The Cleveland Clinic and University of Akron have formed the Integrated Bioscience Fellowship in Biomedicine. Fellowships will allow students to conduct cutting-edge research at the University of Akron and the Cleveland Clinic Lerner Research Institute while pursuing a PhD in Integrated Bioscience. Recipients of Fellowships will be able to work with faculty at both institutions.

The University of Akron School of Law was founded in 1921 as Akron Law School and became affiliated with the university in 1959, becoming fully accredited by the American Bar Association in 1961. It has both day and evening full-time and part-time programs that lead to the J.D. and LL.M. The University of Akron School of Law is also one of only 22 institutions in America to offer the LL.M. in intellectual property, and one of two such programs in Ohio.

=== Undergraduate admissions ===
Undergraduate admissions statistics
- 2023 entering class
- Admit rate: 70.91% (▼ −1.98)
- Yield rate: 19.68% (▼ −5.71)

Test scores middle 50%
- SAT Total: 960–1190 (among 20% of FTFs)
- ACT Composite: 18–25 (among 72% of FTFs)

High school GPA
- Average: 3.49

Admission to the University of Akron is classified as "inclusive" by the Carnegie Classification of Institutions of Higher Education. The Princeton Review gives Akron an "Admissions Selectivity Rating" of 75 out of 99. The college extends offers of admission after holistic review that includes examination of academic rigor, performance and admissions test scores.

Of all matriculating students, the average high school GPA is 3.49. The interquartile range for SAT scores in math and reading are 470-600 and 480-590 respectively, while the range for ACT scores is 18–25.

== Research ==
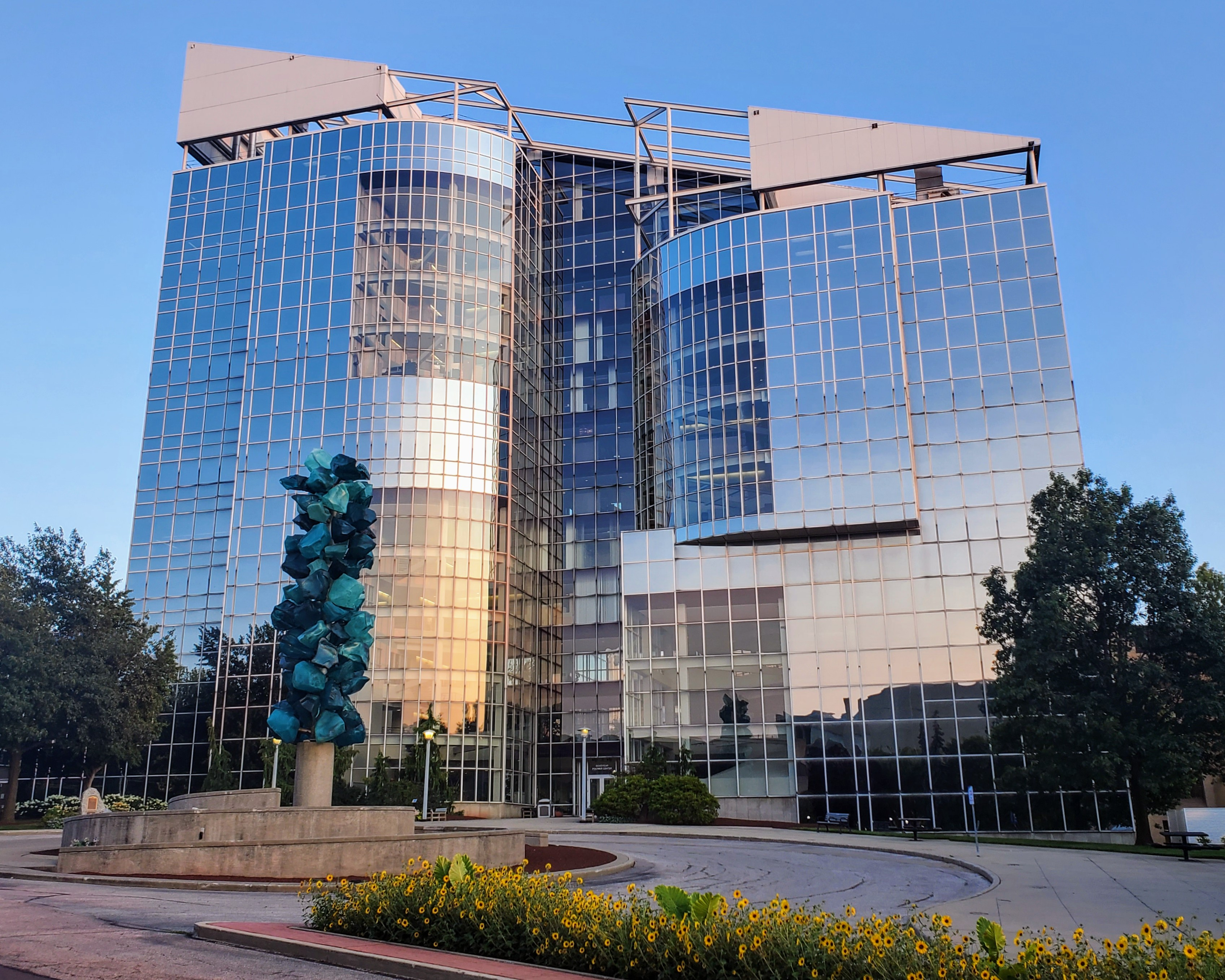
Goodyear Polymer Center

The Goodyear Polymer Center is a 146,000-square foot research facility, located at the university. Built in 1991, the center comprises two 12-story and nine-story towers connected by glass-enclosed walkways that serve as areas for informal interaction. It contains eight large polymer synthesis groups, computer simulation and modeling capabilities, a microscopy suite, molecular and morphological characterization labs, surface analysis facilities, and thermal analysis and mechanical properties testing equipment.

The Goodyear Polymer Center houses both the Department of Polymer Science and the School of Polymer Science and Polymer Engineering. The building houses classrooms, approximately 60 labs, 20 faculty offices, and 25 offices with 200 modules arranged in clusters for students and researchers. It contains the Nuclear Magnetic Resonance Center, the Paul J. Flory Reading Room, the International Rubber Science Hall of Fame portrait gallery, Applied Polymer Research Center, and the 213-seat Goodyear Tire and Rubber Company Auditorium.

The Ray C. Bliss Institute of Applied Politics is a bipartisan research institute dedicated to increasing understanding of the political process with an emphasis on political parties, grassroots activity, and ethical behavior.

== Student life ==
Student body composition as of November 22, 2024
Race and ethnicity	Total
White	72%
Black	12%
Other (Note: Other consists of Multiracial Americans & those who prefer to not say.)	7%
Hispanic	4%
Asian	4%
Foreign national	2%
Economic diversity
Low-income (Note: The percentage of students who received an income-based federal Pell grant intended for low-income students.)	33%
Affluent (Note: The percentage of students who are a part of the American middle class at the bare minimum.)	67%

The University of Akron has more than twenty fraternities and sororities. The Ohio Epsilon chapter of Phi Delta Theta fraternity, founded in 1875, is the oldest continuous Greek-letter organization on campus. The Lone Star Fraternity claimed to be the oldest local fraternity in the United States, founded in 1882 with only one chapter. The organization suspended operation in 2021 due to reports of hazing.

The Beta Tau chapter of Alpha Delta Pi was founded on the University of Akron's campus as "Sigma Delta Theta" in 1920 and at the time it was the oldest local sorority on campus. Sigma Delta Theta later became the Beta Tau chapter of Alpha Delta Pi in 1938.

Phi Kappa Tau was originally founded as Sigma Beta Nu in 1923. The Ray C. Bliss Institute of Applied Politics offers scholarships to men pursuing political science while being members of the organization. Notable alumni include politician Ray C. Bliss and mayor Tom Sawyer.

== Athletics ==
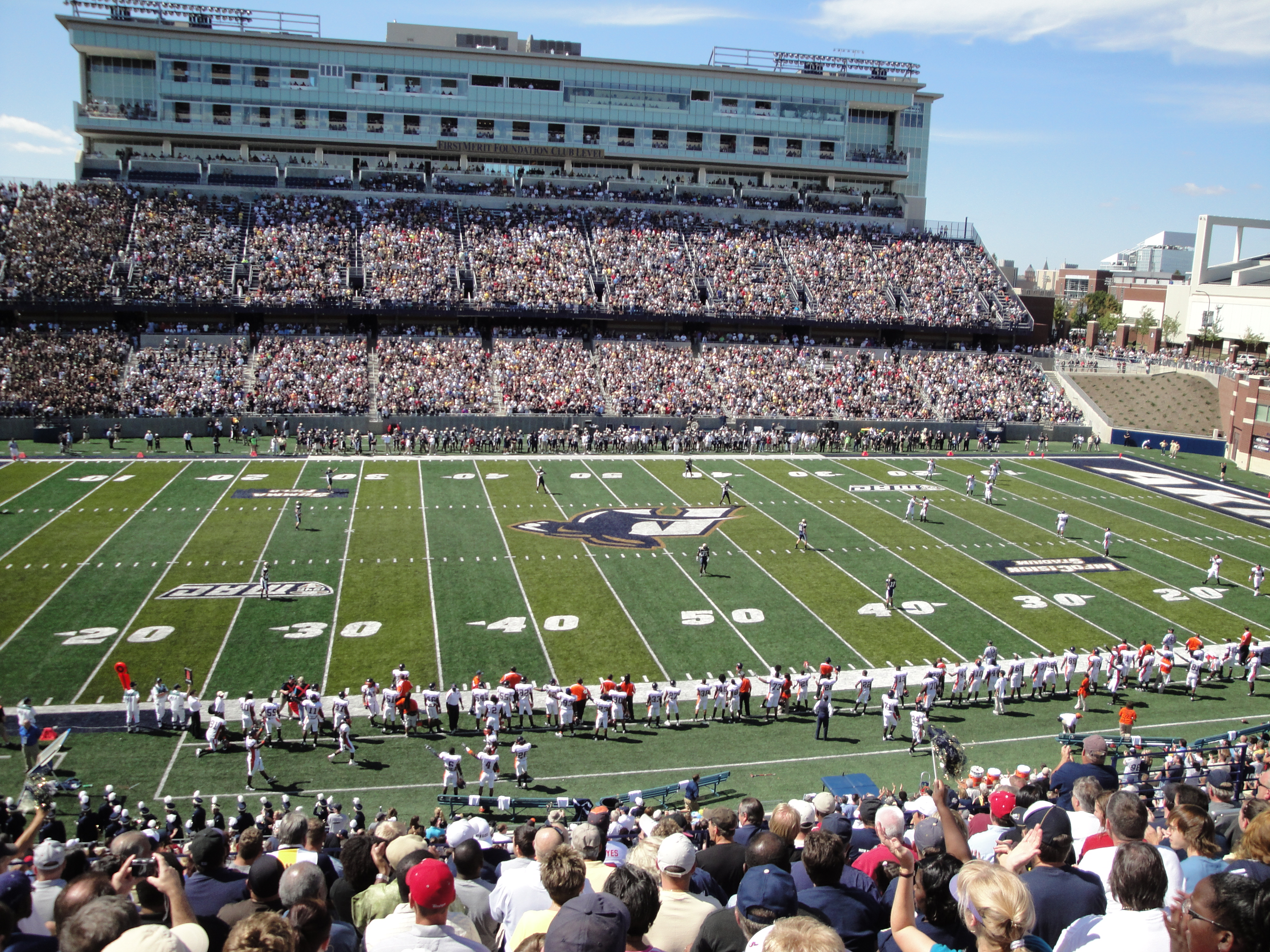
The Akron Zips 2009 home opener against Morgan State University

The University of Akron athletic teams are known as the Zips, a nickname which derives from overshoes with zippers made by Akron-based Goodrich Corporation in the 1920s and 1930s. Akron competes at the NCAA Division I level as a member of the Mid-American Conference (MAC). Akron sponsors 17 varsity teams across six men's, 10 women's, and one coed NCAA sanctioned sports. The university's mascot is "Zippy," a kangaroo who is one of eight female college mascots in the United States.

Akron's athletic facilities include InfoCision Stadium–Summa Field for football, the James A. Rhodes Arena for basketball and volleyball, and the FirstEnergy Stadium–Cub Cadet Field for soccer. Student supporters at athletic events are commonly called AK-ROWDIES.

The Akron Zips football team was established in 1891. The football team competes in the Football Bowl Subdivision, the highest level of competition for college football. Akron's major rivalry is with Kent State Golden Flashes; the two schools compete for the Wagon Wheel trophy. In 2005, Akron won their first MAC football championship, allowing them to compete for the Motor City Bowl, Akron's first bowl game appearance where they lost to the Memphis Tigers.

In soccer, the Akron Zips men's soccer team, ranked number one throughout the 2009 regular season, went undefeated, making it to the NCAA Men's Division I Soccer Championship. The following season they secured the 2010 "College Cup" against the Louisville Cardinals. This was the first NCAA national team championship won by the Zips.

The Akron Zips men's basketball team has appeared in the NCAA Division I men's basketball tournament eight times, most recently in 2026, and have won the Mid-American Conference men's basketball tournament seven times.

== Notable alumni ==
=== Politics ===
- Former Akron mayor and Ohio Congressman Thomas C. Sawyer attended undergraduate and graduate school there.
- United States Court of Appeals for the Sixth Circuit Senior Judge Deborah L. Cook received her Bachelor of Arts and Juris Doctor degrees from the university.
- Former Ohio congresswoman Betty Sutton received her Juris Doctor from the university as well.
- Former Republican National Committee chairman Ray C. Bliss graduated from Akron in 1935. The university's Ray C. Bliss Institute of Applied Politics is named for him.
- Former Akron Mayor Daniel Horrigan earned BA in education from the university.
- Former Republican National Committee Co-chair and current Ohio Republican Party Chairman Bob Paduchik earned his bachelor's degree in political science from the university in 1989.
- Congressman Shri Thanedar received his Ph.D. from the university in 1982.

=== Athletics ===
- Former Akron Zips football players Chase Blackburn, Charlie Frye, Domenik Hixon, Dwight Smith, and Jason Taylor have each gone on to find success in the National Football League. Blackburn and Hixon were members of the 2008 Super Bowl Champion New York Giants, while Smith won a Super Bowl Ring with the Tampa Bay Buccaneers in 2003. Taylor was named the NFL Defensive Player of the Year in 2006, the NFL's Man of the Year in 2007 and was inducted into the Pro Football Hall of Fame in 2017.
- Baseball players Chris Bassitt, Mike Birkbeck and Mark Malaska have gone on to find success in Major League Baseball. Birkbeck played for the Milwaukee Brewers from 1986 to 1989 and the New York Mets in 1992 and 1995. Malaska played for the Tampa Bay Rays in 2003 and was a member of the 2004 World Series Champion Boston Red Sox. Former Zips baseball player Keith Dambrot went on to become a distinguished college basketball coach.
- Soccer players in the MLS (24) include Colorado Rapids (1): Dillon Serna (2012); Columbus Crew (2): Chad Barson (2009–12), Wil Trapp (2011-12); D.C. United (2): Perry Kitchen (2010), Chris Korb (2008–10); Houston Dynamo (1): Kofi Sarkodie (2008–10); Montreal Impact (2): Evan Bush (2005–08), Sinisa Ubiparipovic (2004-06); New England Revolution (1): Scott Caldwell (2009–12); New York Red Bulls (1): Eric Stevenson (2009–13); Philadelphia Union (2): Robbie Derschang (2012–13), Aodhan Quinn (2011-13); Portland Timbers (6): Bryan Gallego (2011–13), David Meves (2009–12), Darlington Nagbe (2008–10), Michael Nanchoff (2007–10), Steve Zakuani (2007–08), Ben Zemanski (2006-09); Seattle Sounders (2): Blair Gavin (2007–09), DeAndre Yedlin (2011-12); Sporting Kansas City (2): Reinaldo Brenes (2010–13), Teal Bunbury (2008-09); Toronto FC Richie Laryea (2014–15) Vancouver Whitecaps (1): Darren Mattocks (2010–11).
- Track and field athlete Shawn Barber, went professional in 2015, signing with Nike, after winning the IAAF World Track and Field Championships in Men's Pole Vault. Clayton Murphy is a professional middle-distance track runner with Nike, and earned the bronze medal in the 800m in the 2016 Olympic Games.
- Cheerleader Alexis Kaufman, known as Alexa Bliss, has held a combined total of seven championships in WWE. She is also both the second and youngest woman to be named a WWE Triple Crown (professional wrestling).
- Basketball player Enrique Freeman, as of March, 2026, plays for the Minnesota Timberwolves of the National Basketball Association (drafted by the Indianapolis Pacers). Kwan Cheatham plays for Ironi Nes Ziona of the Israel Basketball Premier League

== See also ==
- List of colleges and universities in Ohio
