= Ray C. Bliss Institute of Applied Politics =

The Ray C. Bliss Institute of Applied Politics is a nonpartisan research and educational organization located at the University of Akron in Akron, OH. The Bliss Institute, founded in 1986, is named for Ray C. Bliss, University of Akron alumnus, university trustee and former chair of the Republican National Committee. The Bliss Institute is also one of the few academic institutions which grants a master's in applied politics. This degree prepares individuals for a hands career-based approach to political science. Dr. J Cherie Strachan is the center's director.
