= Zippy (mascot) =

Mascot of the University of Akron

Zippy the Kangaroo
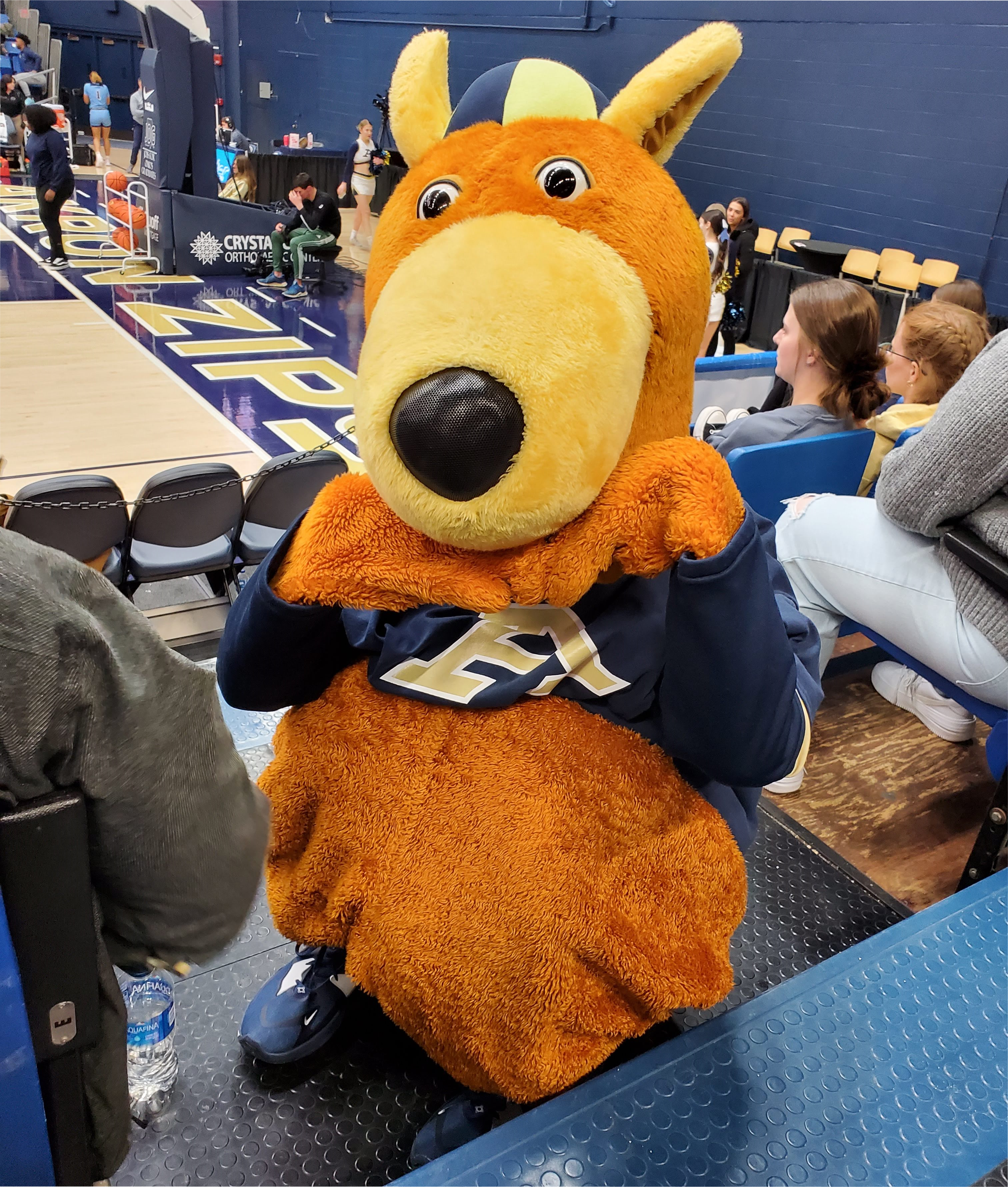
- Zippy at a basketball game
- University: The University of Akron
- Conference: MAC
- Description: Kangaroos
- First seen: May 1, 1953
- Website: http://www.uakron.edu/zippy/

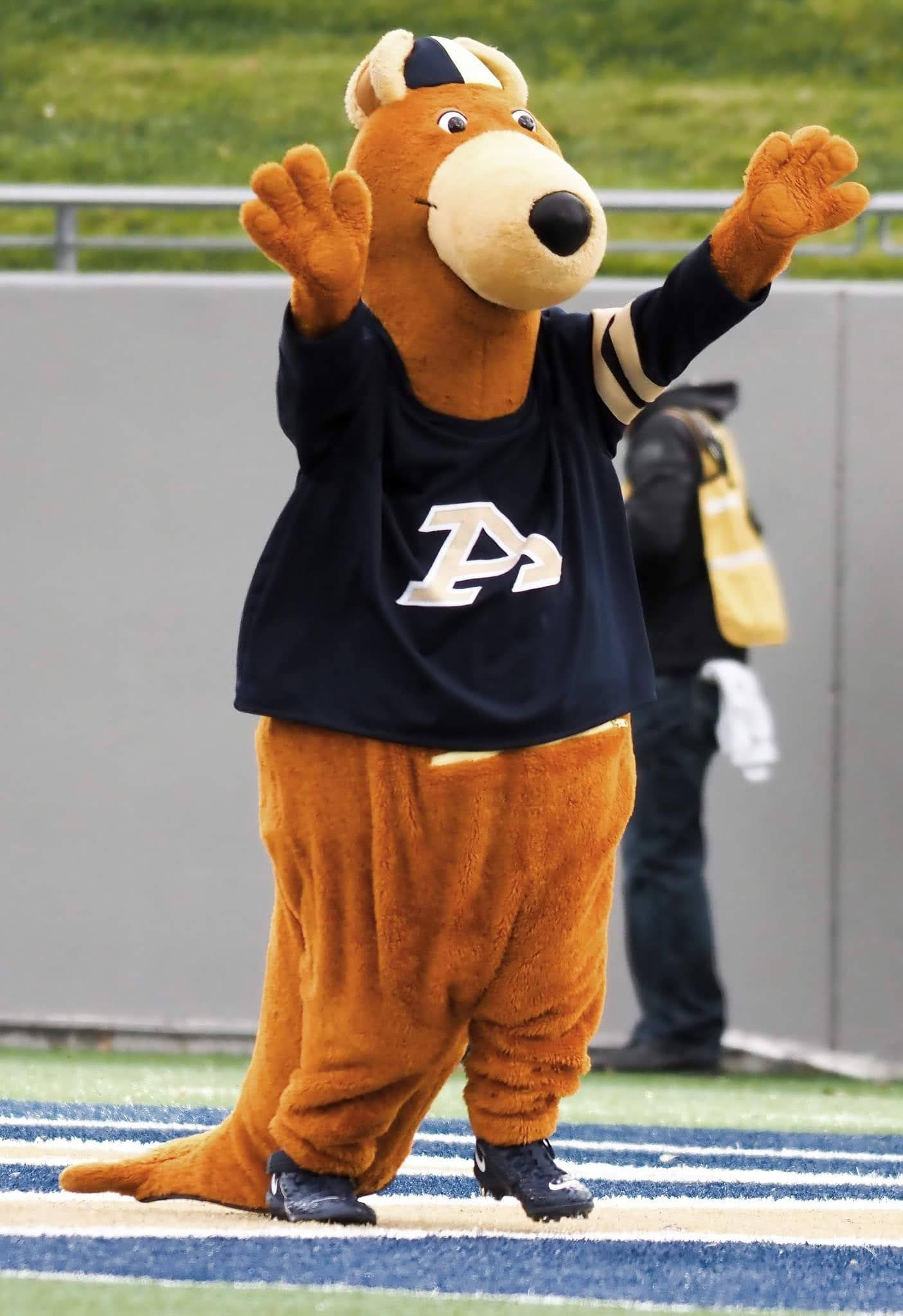
Zippy at a football game.

Zippy is the female mascot of The University of Akron athletics team. Zippy is a kangaroo.

The school's nickname, "Zips", is a shortening of "Zippers", a pair of rubber overshoes and a brand name of the BF Goodrich Company of Akron. It was originally adopted by the school in 1926 after a contest to give the school a nickname. In 1950, the current nickname "Zippy" was adopted. Two years later, a committee suggested the kangaroo as a mascot ("Kangaroos" was one of the choices in 1926), and it was accepted by the student council on May 1, 1953. In December of 1953, a "kangaroo contest" was held among a campus election to tie everything together. Joseph T. Dick, an undergraduate at the time, penned the original design, creating Zippy as she is officially known today.

"Zippy" has always been a costumed mascot, and currently wears a blue letter-sweater and a gold-and-blue rat cap.

In 2007 Zippy was chosen as one of twelve collegiate mascots to compete for Capital One Bowl mascot of the year. With an unprecedented 13–0 record, Zippy was named the winner on January 1, 2008.
