= John R. Buchtel =

American businessman and philanthropist

- Born: January 18, 1820; Stark County, Ohio, U.S.
- Died: May 23, 1892 (aged 72)
- Occupation: Businessman

John R. Buchtel (January 18, 1820 – May 23, 1892) was an American businessman and philanthropist. He founded Buchtel College, which became The University of Akron. Buchtel High School, a public high school in Akron, Ohio, is named in his honor.

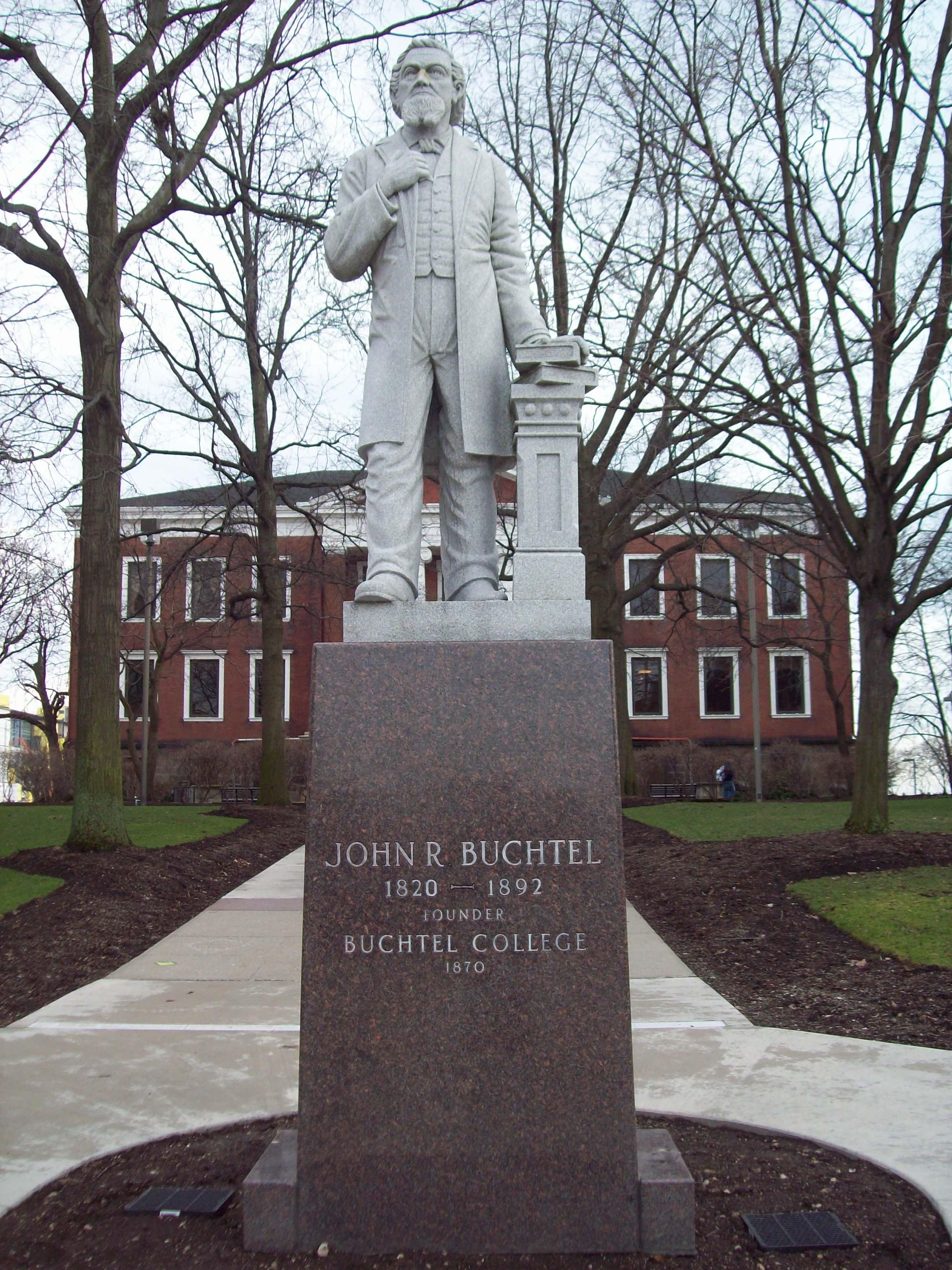
Statue of John R. Buchtel in front of Buchtel Hall

Buchtel was born on January 18, 1820, in Stark County, Ohio. He began his business interests in agriculture, acquiring a large amount of farmland in Stark County and in the state of Indiana. He then worked for Ball, Aultman, and Company, and led the development of the company's new factory in Akron, which became known as the Buckeye Mower and Reaper Company. When Buckeye Mower became independent, Buchtel served as its first president. He later became the general manager of the Akron Iron Company, and when it merged with several other firms to create the Columbus and Hocking Coal and Iron Company, he served as one of its vice-presidents. He was also an early investor in the rubber company of Dr. Benjamin F. Goodrich. In 1887, a stroke left him unable to work.

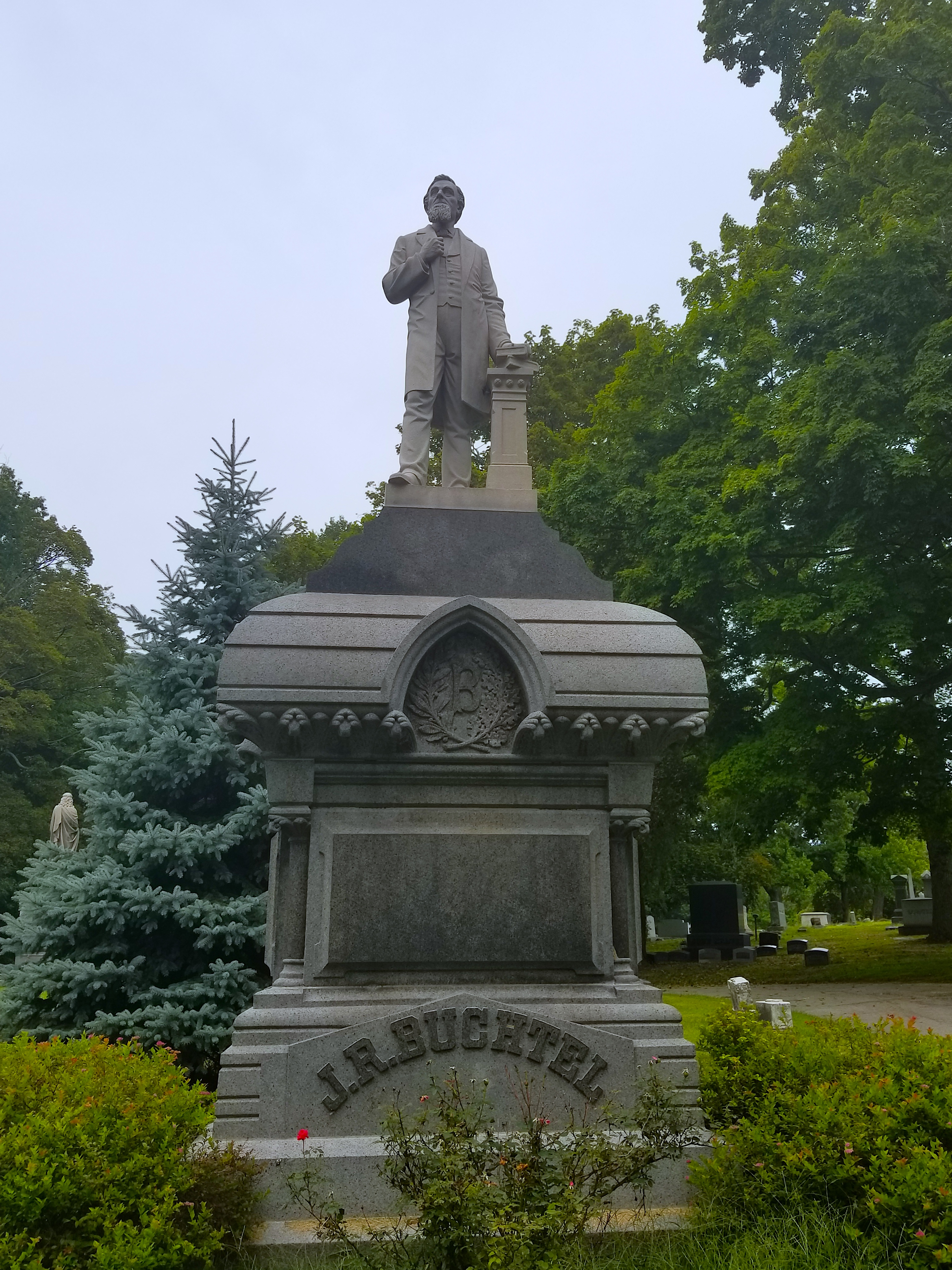
Resting place of John R. Buchtel, Glendale Cemetery

He died on May 23, 1892.
