= Linn Wells =

American coach, military officer, and sportscaster (1900–1979)

Biographical details
- Born: December 7, 1900; North Anson, Maine, U.S.
- Died: January 24, 1979 (aged 78); Wilton, Maine, U.S.
- Education: Springfield College

Coaching career (HC unless noted)

Football
- 1922: Mineville HS (NY)
- 1923: Locust Valley HS (NY)
- 1924–1926: Bradford HS (PA)
- 1927: Bloomsburg Area HS (PA)
- 1928–1930: Fairhaven HS (MA)
- 1931–1941: Bowdoin (asst.)
- 1946: NAS Ottumwa
- 1948–1949: NAS Pensacola
- 1951–1952: Augustana (SD)

Baseball
- 1923: Mineville HS (NY)
- 1924: Locust Valley HS (NY)
- 1925–1927: Bradford HS (PA)
- 1928: Bloomsburg Area HS (PA)
- 1929–1931: Fairhaven HS (MA)
- 1932–1942: Bowdoin
- 1947: NAS Ottumwa

Men's ice Hockey
- 1931–1942: Bowdoin

Head coaching record
- Overall: 3–14 (football); 54–85–1 (baseball); 26–54–2 (ice hockey)

Linn Scott Wells (December 7, 1900 – January 24, 1979) was an American coach, military officer, and sportscaster who was the head baseball and men's ice hockey coach at Bowdoin College and the head football coach at Augustana College (South Dakota).

== Early life ==
Wells was born in North Anson, Maine and raised in Wilton, Maine. He lettered in football (four years), baseball (three years), track (three years), and basketball (two years) at the Wilton Academy and graduated with the class of 1919. In 1922, he graduated from Springfield College.

== Coaching ==
Wells began his coaching career in 1922 at Mineville High School in Mineville, New York, where he was supervisor of physical education and coach of all sports. He then coached at Locust Valley High School in Lattingtown, New York. He subsequently moved to Pennsylvania, where he coached at Bradford High School for three years and Bloomsburg Area High School for one year. In 1928, he became the football, baseball, and track coach at Fairhaven High School in Fairhaven, Massachusetts. Over three seasons, he led the school's football team to a 23–4 record. Two of his players, quarterback Johnny Freitas and end Frank Velho, played at Boston College. His baseball teams went 32–14 and his 1929 squad team went 16–2 and won the Bristol County Conference championship.

In 1931, Wells joined the athletic staff at Bowdoin College as head men's ice hockey coach and baseball coach and assistant football coach. His hockey teams went 26–54–2 and his baseball teams went 54–85–1.

During the summers, Wells played and managed semipro baseball teams. He began his managerial career in 1922 in Port Henry, New York. The following year, he managed a team in Ticonderoga, New York. In 1923, he played in Bradford, Pennsylvania. In 1929, he became manager the Falmouth Club in the Cape Cod Baseball League. He led the team to a 25–19 record, good for a first place finish. He returned for the 1930 season, but left before the end of the year. He was the starting catcher for the Wilton Giants of the Pine Tree League in 1932 and managed the club the following season. In 1935, he was the player–manager for the PTL's Carrabassett team. He was a member of the training and selection committee for the baseball exhibition game played at the 1936 Summer Olympics. In 1937, he managed the St. Albans Lions of the Northern League. In 1938 and 1939, he was player–manager of the Lancaster Pilots of the Twin State League. In 1941, he returned to the Northern League as skipper of the Claremont Pilots.

Wells returned to college coaching in 1951 as the head football coach at Augustana University in Sioux Falls, South Dakota. He resigned in March 1953. His record over two seasons was 3–14.

== Military service ==
In 1942, Wells joined the United States Naval Reserve's physical fitness program. He was commissioned a Lieutenant (junior grade) ordered to report to the naval aviation training school at the University of North Carolina at Chapel Hill on August 27, 1942. That October, he was put in charge of physical and military training at Naval Air Station Hutchinson. In 1944, he was transferred to Naval Air Station Grosse Ile. Later that year, he was sent to the Navy Pre Flight School at the University of Georgia, where he served as administrative assistant to the executive officer. In June 1945, he was transferred to Naval Air Station Glenview.

In 1946, Wells decided not to return to Bowdoin and remain in the Navy. That fall, he coached the Naval Air Station Ottumwa football team. In 1947, Wells move to Naval Air Station Pensacola after the Pre-Flight school at NAS Ottumwa was moved there. In 1948, he coached the Naval Air Station Pensacola Goslings football team. He was discharged in 1950 with the rank of commander.

== Broadcasting ==
Wells began his broadcasting career in 1938. After retiring from the Navy, he settled in Minot, North Dakota and worked as a radio sports announcer. In 1950, he became the first sports editor of KCJB-TV. In 1953, he returned to Maine as a sportscaster for WCOU in Lewiston. The following year he joined WGAN in Portland, Maine. When WGAN-TV went on the air in 1954, he was its first sports anchor.

By February 1962, Wells was working for the Mutual Benefit Life Insurance Company. Later that year, he became an assistant to the president of St. Francis College in Biddeford, Maine. By the following year, he was once again broadcasting, working as an executive and news and sports announcer at WMOU in Berlin, New Hampshire. By March 1965, he was the news and sports director at WIOU in Kokomo, Indiana.

== Age discrimination lawsuit and death ==
By 1968, Wells had returned to Wilton, Maine and was offered the position of station manager at WKTJ-FM in Farmington, Maine after owner Elden H. Shute resigned to run for Congress. In 1976, the station instituted a mandatory retirement age of 70. Wells was fired that December after his 76th birthday. In May 1977, Wells sued his former employer for age discrimination. Wells' suit was unsuccessful, but he appealed the decision, arguing that the judge had issued improper instructions to the jury. Wells died on January 24, 1979 at his home in Wilton. Six months later, the Maine Supreme Judicial Court unanimously ruled in Wells' favor, with Chief Justice Vincent L. McKusick noting that the judge should have told the jury to consider if age was a substantial factor in Wells' firing, not the sole reason for his dismissal. The case was remanded, but Wells' widow declined to pursue another trial.
