= John Mohring =

John Mohring may refer to:

- John Mohring (linebacker, born 1956), American football player
- John Mohring (linebacker, born 1984), American football player
