= Mike Mohring =

Mike Mohring may refer to:

- Mike Mohring (politician) (born 1971), German politician
- Mike Mohring (American football) (born 1974), American football defensive tackle
