= John Mohring (linebacker, born 1956) =

American football player

No. 62, 55
- Position: Linebacker

Personal information
- Born: November 14, 1956 (age 69); Glen Cove, New York, U.S.
- Listed height: 6 ft 4 in (1.93 m)
- Listed weight: 240 lb (109 kg)

Career information
- High school: Locust Valley
- College: St. John's; C. W. Post
- NFL draft: 1979: 8th round, 213th overall pick

Career history
- Detroit Lions (1979–1980); Cleveland Browns (1980)

Career NFL statistics
- Sacks: 1
- Fumble recoveries: 1
- Stats at Pro Football Reference

John Dennis Mohring Sr. (born November 14, 1956) is an American former professional football player who was a linebacker for the Detroit Lions and Cleveland Browns of the National Football League (NFL). He played college football for the C. W. Post Pioneers.

== Early life and college ==
John Mohring was born on November 14, 1956, in Glen Cove, New York. He went to Locust Valley High School before playing college football at C. W. Post. While in high school, he was an all-star selection as an outfielder in baseball, a center in basketball, and a two-way player in football. He also spent one year at St. John's University playing baseball, before transferring to C. W. Post. By his sophomore year at C. W. Post he was already considered to be one of the best defensive players, with 12 sacks, three blocked punts, three passes defended, and 64 tackles by mid-November. His coach Dom Anile described him as, "the best athlete we've ever had" and "a super athlete who can do anything as if it comes naturally." He played in all four of his years at C. W. Post. He still holds the Post all-time records for sacks (56), single-season tackles (135), and career tackles (439). He twice was all-American and was inducted into the C. W. Post Hall of Fame in 2006.

== Professional career ==
=== Detroit Lions ===
Before the draft Detroit Lions coach Marty Schottenheimer told Mohring that, "if he was available in the fourth round, he would draft him". An article by Newsday said that a television crew from NBC was poised by Mohring during the entire day one of the draft, but he was not selected. It wasn't until the 8th round of the 1979 NFL draft that he was selected. However, he suffered an injury in training camp and was placed on the season-ending injured reserve. In his second season with the team, he played in week one, but was then released.

=== Cleveland Browns ===
A week after being released by Detroit Mohring was signed by the Cleveland Browns. With the Browns he appeared in the remaining 14 games. In a game against the Houston Oilers, he recovered a fumble on the opening kickoff to help his team win, 17–14. He also played in their playoff game against the Oakland Raiders, which would be known as Red Right 88. Mohring was released the next season, ending his professional career.

== Personal life ==
After his playing career, he owned a landscaping business for 20 years. He also owned a car wash.

John and his wife Trisha have three children, John Jr., Logan, and Avery. His son John Jr. played professionally in the NFL, CFL, and IFL. His cousin Mike also played in the NFL.
