= Yorktown-class aircraft carrier =

US Navy aircraft carrier class

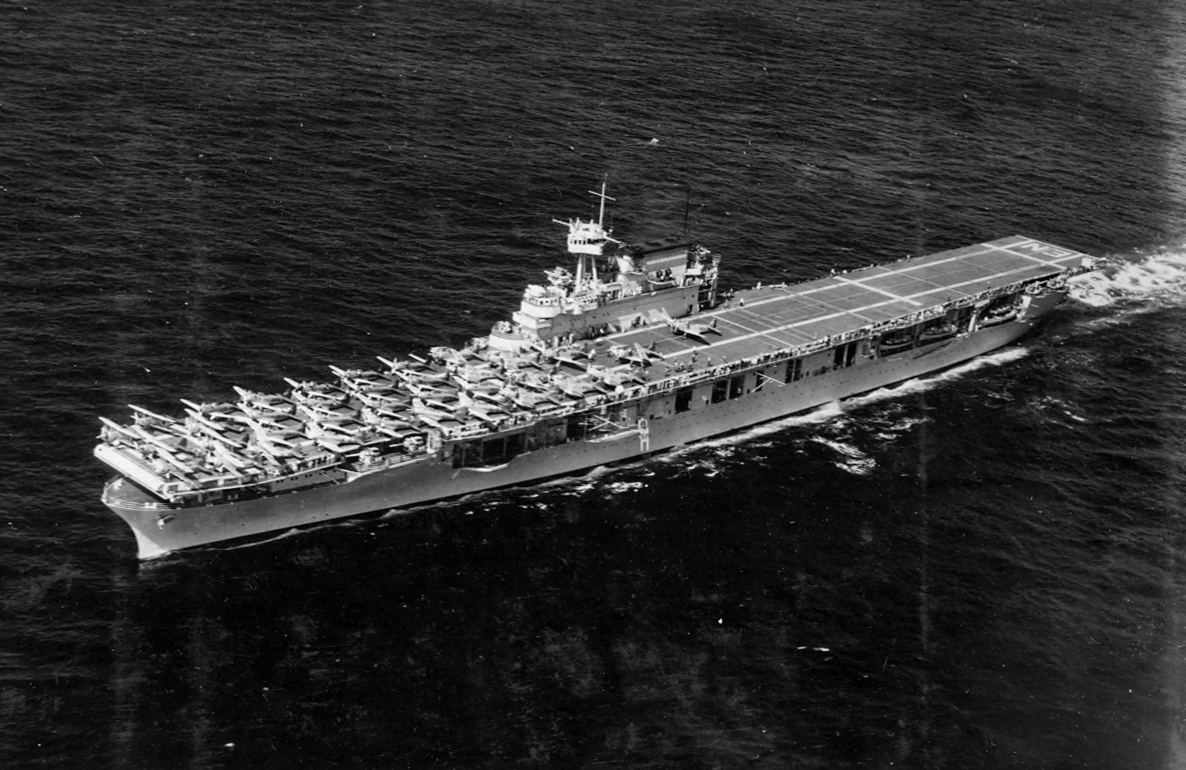
- USS Enterprise

Class overview
- Builders: Newport News Shipbuilding
- Operators: United States Navy
- Preceded by: USS Ranger
- Succeeded by: USS Wasp
- Built: 21 May 1934 - 20 October 1941
- In commission: 30 September 1937 – 17 February 1947
- Completed: 3
- Lost: 2
- Retired: 1

General characteristics
- Type: Aircraft carrier
- Displacement: 19,800 long tons (20,100 t) standard; 25,500 long tons (25,900 t)) full load
- Length: 770 ft (230 m) waterline at design draft; 809 ft 9 in (246.81 m) length of main hull; 824 ft 9 in (251.38 m) overall length; 802 ft (244 m) flight deck
- Beam: 83 ft (25 m) at waterline; 109 ft 6 in (33.38 m) width at flight deck
- Draft: 26 ft (7.9 m); (24 ft 4 in (7.42 m) design draft)
- Propulsion: 9 Babcock & Wilcox boilers; 4-shaft Parsons geared turbines 120,000 shp (89 MW)
- Speed: 32.5 kn (60.2 km/h; 37.4 mph)
- Range: 12,500 nmi (23,200 km)
- Complement: 2,217
- Sensors & processing systems: SC radar
- Armament: 8 × 5 in/38 caliber guns; 4 × quad 1.1 in/75 caliber guns (Enterprise upgraded to 40 mm Bofors guns); 24 × .50 Cal machine guns (all of the ships upgraded to 20 mm Oerlikon cannons)
- Armor: Belt: 2.5–4 in (6.4–10.2 cm); Tower: 4 inches (10 cm)
- Aircraft carried: 90
- Aviation facilities: 2 flight deck catapults; 1 hangar catapult; 3 aircraft elevators

The Yorktown class was a class of three aircraft carriers built for the United States Navy and completed shortly before World War II, the Yorktown (CV-5), Enterprise (CV-6), and Hornet (CV-8). They immediately followed Ranger, the first U.S. aircraft carrier built as such. As Ranger was not commissioned until two weeks after Yorktown was laid down, experience with that vessel did not influence the design of the Yorktown ships; rather, the design was influenced most strongly by experience with the Lexington-class ships, built on the partially completed hulls of two battlecruisers and commissioned in 1927, and the early experimental carrier Langley, commissioned in 1924.

The Yorktown-class ships bore the brunt of the fighting in the Pacific during 1942, and two of the three were lost: Yorktown, sunk on 07 June 1942 after the Battle of Midway, and Hornet, which was heavily damaged by the Japanese at the Battle of the Santa Cruz Islands, and survived attempts at scuttling by the US Navy, but was finally sunk by the Japanese.

Enterprise, the sole survivor of the class, was the most decorated ship of the U.S. Navy in the Second World War. After efforts to save her as a museum ship failed, she was scrapped in 1958.

== Development ==
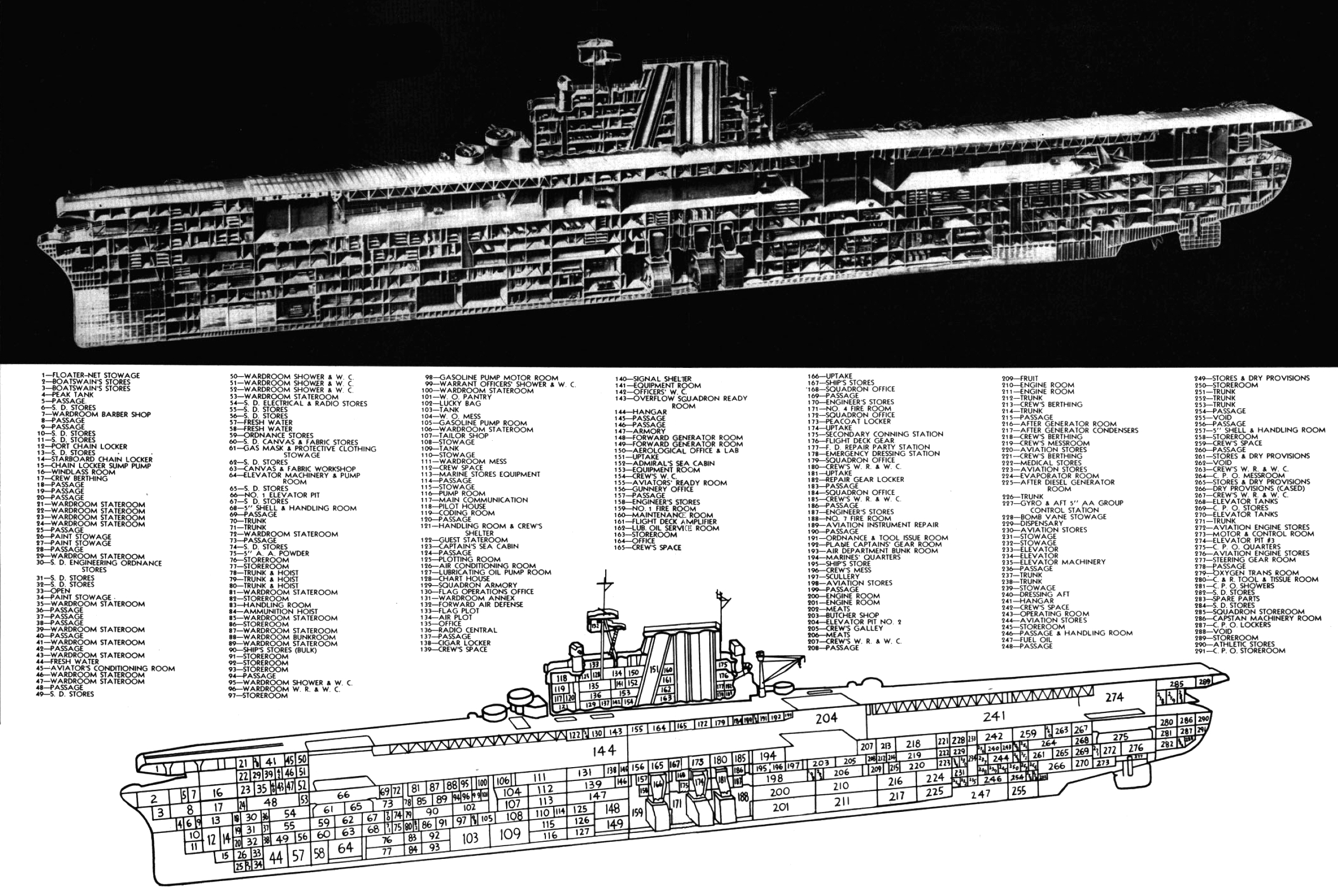

After the commissioning of the two 33,000-[long] ton (33,530-tonne) Lexington class ships in 1927-28, a strong sentiment arose within the Navy that the remaining 69,000 tons (70,107 tonnes) of carriers allowed under the Washington Naval Treaties should be built as quickly as possible. The idea that the additional tonnage should come in the form of multiple ships built to a single design was also widely accepted, but different factions advocated for three different packages--either five ships, displacing 13,800 tons (14,021 tonnes) each, or four ships, displacing 17,250 tons (17,527 tonnes) each, or three ships, displacing 23,000 tons (23,369 tonnes) each. The consensus as of the late 1920s was that the largest number of decks would offer the greatest total aircraft capacity, and a decision was then made to order the five small carriers. For once, government parsimony proved beneficial; Congress, on 13 February 1929, authorized construction of only one of the 13,800-ton carriers, which became Ranger. Years passed before funding for additional carriers was approved, and by the time it was, experience with Lexington and Saratoga had demonstrated the pronounced advantages of larger carriers, to such a degree that even before Ranger was commissioned, the selection of such a small, slow, and poorly protected design was widely considered to have been unwise.

The desirability of larger size having been settled on, in the early 1930s, the question of exactly how to use up the tonnage remaining under Washington Treaty limits arose once again, leading to the development of a new series of schemes. Factoring in Ranger, designers now had about 55,200 tons (56,086) tonnes left with which to work. Again, one faction argued for the creation of a uniform class, now to consist of three, 18,400-ton (18,695-tonne) carriers, to fill the quota, but a strong opposing faction wanted to incorporate more of the features found on the much larger Lexington ships (high speed, torpedo protection, and an armored belt, any one of which would have been difficult to accommodate on an 18,400-ton displacement) into at least some ships. The General Board eventually settled on the idea of building two fairly large (about 20,000-ton/20,321 tonne) carriers incorporating 32.5-knot speed, armor, and substantial underwater protection, and one smaller, roughly 15,000-ton (15,241-tonne) vessel, broadly similar to the large ones, but lacking the protective features. The smaller carrier would eventually become Wasp, while the larger two became Yorktown and Enterprise. General designs for these two classes of ships were chosen from among a common slate of 15 draft designs presented to the General Board in 1931 by the Bureau of Construction and Repair. All 15 of these schemes included islands, long opposed by the Bureau of Aeronautics, but due to operational experience accumulated with the Lexington ships by 1931, now considered desirable. Funding for construction of the two larger ships came with the National Recovery Act, passed on June 16, 1933, and Yorktown was laid down on May 21, 1934, two weeks before Ranger was commissioned. Enterprise was laid down on July 16, 1934. Work on the smaller Wasp was delayed for some time, but was ultimately authorized under the Vinson-Trammel Act of 1934, and construction, to essentially the specification laid out in 1931, began in 1936.

Two days after Enterprise was commissioned, in May 1938, partly in response to the withdrawal of Italy and Japan from the global naval arms limitation treaty structure, Congress passed the Naval Act of 1938, which authorized a major expansion of the Navy, including construction of 40,200 additional tons (40,845 tonnes) of aircraft carriers. After considerable debate and dithering, the Navy decided that to get a ship in service as quickly as possible, roughly half of this extra tonnage would be given over to building a third ship to a minimally modified Yorktown design, while time was spent figuring out how best to use the remainder. The third Yorktown-class ship, Hornet, was ordered in March 1939 and commissioned only a month before Pearl Harbor.

Each Yorktown-class ship was built with a transverse catapult on her hangar deck; these could launch aircraft in a direction perpendicular to the direction of the ship's motion, or while the ship was at anchor. These catapults were intended as substitutes for the lower-level flying-off decks that had been adopted by the British and Japanese in the 1920s, which allowed aircraft to be launched straight forward off both the upper flight deck and the deck below it at the same time, allowing the launch of more aircraft quickly in a scramble situation. Statements that the transverse catapults were intended to be used primarily for the launching of scout planes appear to be unfounded; all readily available photos of these catapults in use depict the launching of combat aircraft (fighters and torpedo bombers), rather than scouts. In practice, the U. S. commanders rarely used the hangar-deck catapults because of the difficulties inherent in controlling a plane launched across a heavy crosswind, which would inevitably be faced when the ship was moving forward at high speed to allow aircraft to be flown off the axial flight deck at the same time. The hangar-deck catapults were removed from Enterprise and Hornet in late June 1942.

All three ships of the Yorktown class were built at the Newport News Shipbuilding Company, Newport News, Virginia.

== Design ==
The Yorktown-class ships had a length of 770 feet (235 m) at the waterline and 824 ft 9 in (251.38 m) overall. They had a beam of 83 ft 3 in (25.37 m) at the waterline and 114 ft (35 m) overall, with a draft of 24 ft 4 in (7.42 m) as designed and 28 ft (8.5 m) at full load. They displaced around 20,000 long tons (20,321 t) at standard load and 25,500 long tons (25,900 t) at full load. Notations on blueprints for Yorktown (dated 30 January 1939) indicate that the ship was intended to carry a crew of 83 officers, 90 chief petty officers (CPOs), and 1346 enlisted men, along with an aviation component consisting of 108 officers, 66 CPOs, and 538 enlisted men, plus an "extra complement when squadrons are aboard".

Each ship was powered by nine Babcock & Wilcox boilers providing steam at 400 psi (2,800 kPa) and 648 °F (342 °C) to four Parsons Marine geared steam turbines, each driving its own propeller. The turbines were designed to produce a total of 120,000 shaft horsepower [shp] (89,000 kW), giving the ships a range of 12,000 nautical miles (14,000 mi; 22,000 km) at a speed of 15 knots (17 mph; 28 km/h). The ships were designed to carry 4,280 long tons (4,350 t) of fuel oil and 178,000 US gal (670,000 L) of avgas. Designed top speed was 32.5 knots (60.2 km/h; 37.4 mph). During sea trials, she produced 120,500 shp (89,900 kW) and reached 33.85 knots (62.69 km/h; 38.95 mph).

The ships were equipped with eight 5-inch (127 mm)/38 caliber dual-purpose guns and 16 1.1-inch (28 mm)/75 caliber antiaircraft (AA) guns in quadruple mounts (four guns operating together). Originally, she had 24 M2 Browning .50-inch (12.7 mm) machine guns, but these were replaced in January 1942 with 30 20-mm Oerlikon AA cannons. An additional 1.1-inch (28 mm) quad mount was later added at her bow and two more 20 mm AA guns were added for a total of 32 mounts. In June 1942, following the battle of Midway, Hornet and Enterprise had new CXAM radar installed atop their tripod masts, and their SC radars were relocated to the main mast. Unlike her sister ships, Hornet's tripod mast and her signal bridge were not enclosed when the CXAM was installed, making her unique among the three ships.

The ships' flight decks measured 814 ft (248 m) in length and 86 ft (26 m) in width, and their hangar decks were 546 ft (166 m) in length and 63 ft (19 m) in width, with a clear height (distance from the floor to the lowest point on anything encroaching from above--in this case, the girder structure underpinning the flight deck) of 17 ft 3 in, and the underside of the flight deck itself about 10 ft higher up. The ships each had three centerline aircraft elevators, each measuring 48 by 44 ft (15 by 13 m), with lifting capacities of 17,000 lb (7,700 kg). Each ship was built with two flight-deck hydraulic catapults pointing forward and a third catapult mounted transversely on the hangar deck; the latter were removed from Enterprise and Hornet in late 1942, after Yorktown had been sunk. All three ships were equipped with Mark IV Mod 3A arresting gear capable of bringing a 16,000 lb (7,300 kg) plane to a halt from a speed of 85 mph (137 km/h). Air groups when Yorktown and Enterprise were commissioned in 1938 consisted of four 18-plane squadrons (fighting, scouting, bombing, and torpedo), with six utility planes; while Hornet's first operational air group, on the eve of the Doolittle Raid, included a 30-plane fighter squadron (VF-8) equipped with F4F-4 Wildcats, scouting (VS-8), and bombing (VB-8) squadrons equipped with a total of 24 Douglas SBD-2 and -3 Dauntlesses, and a torpedo squadron equipped with 10 Douglas TBD-1 Devastators.

The flight and hangar decks of the ships were unarmored. Protection came mainly from a protected box that spanned a c. 508-ft-long stretch in their lower hulls, which encased most of the magazines, boilers, and machinery, and a central communications center. This box consisted of a protective deck on top, a double bottom, and an armored belt and bulkheads to provide vertical protection around its perimeter. The core element of this box was the protective deck, the fourth deck, around 3 ft (1 m) above the water line, made of 60-pound (1.5-inch/38 mm) special treatment steel (STS), a type of steel that could provide some armor protection while also serving a structural function. The armor belt was 2.5 to 4 inches (64–102 mm) thick on a backing of 30-pound (0.75-inch/19 mm) STS and was affixed to the outside of the hull; it extended the length of the protected box, and from the protected deck down 10 ft. Inboard from the belt was a series of 0.375- to 0.75-inch-thick longitudinal torpedo bulkheads. These bulkheads were spaced 3.0 to 4.5 feet apart, from the belt inboard, and were placed so as to shield different stretches along the hull; the stretches covered overlapped each other, so that different intervals within the box were shielded by as few as two and as many as five bulkheads. The sections protected by the greatest number of bulkheads were those behind the thinnest parts of the armor belt; the overall system, belt and bulkheads, were expected to provide fairly uniform side protection against gunfire equivalent to that provided by a true 4-in belt, with some savings in weight. The spaces between the torpedo bulkheads were used to store fuel oil, which was expected to help absorb the shock of torpedo explosions. The torpedo bulkheads extended from the protective deck down to the inner bottom of the vessel, as did two 4-inch-thick transverse STS bulkheads that capped off the forward and aft ends of the box.

The steering gear, abaft the main box, was located in a separate box protected by 4 in (100 mm) armor on the sides and ends, with splinter protection on the deck above, roughly at the waterline. Yorktown and Enterprise each had a cylindrical conning tower, around 9 ft in diameter and 9 ft high, perched up in their islands; this had 4-inch armor around its perimeter and 2 in on the top, and was connected to a communications center just below the protective deck by a "conning tower tube" that was c. 3 feet in diameter. Sources indicate that the conning tower setup was significantly different in Hornet, but what the difference was is not clear; one prominent source has been interpreted (debatably) as saying that conning tower protection was reduced to 30-lb "splinter protection", while another speaks of "a prominent freestanding armored conning tower in front of her open bridge structure."

== Ships in class ==
Construction data
Name	Hull number	Builder	Laid down	Launched	Commissioned	Decommissioned	Fate
Yorktown	CV-5	Newport News Shipbuilding and Drydock Co., Newport News	21 May 1934	4 April 1936	30 September 1937	—N/a	Sunk by submarine following the Battle of Midway, 6 June 1942
Enterprise	CV-6	Newport News Shipbuilding and Drydock Co., Newport News	16 July 1934	3 October 1936	12 May 1938	17 February 1947	Struck 2 October 1956, Broken up at Kearny, New Jersey, 1958
Hornet	CV-8	Newport News Shipbuilding and Drydock Co., Newport News	25 September 1939	14 December 1940	20 October 1941	—N/a	Sunk following the Battle of the Santa Cruz Islands, 26 October 1942

== Operational history ==
The three ships of this class are noted for bearing the brunt of the fighting in the early months of the Pacific War, most notably during the Battle of the Coral Sea, the Battle of Midway, and the Guadalcanal campaign. During the last campaign, Hornet and later Enterprise had the distinction of being the only operational carrier in the United States Pacific Fleet.

Enterprise was at sea on the morning of 7 December 1941 (the day of the attack on Pearl Harbor). That evening, Enterprise, screened by six of her Grumman F4F Wildcat fighters, put into Pearl Harbor for fuel and supplies. The aircraft were fired on by AA defenses, and one pilot radioed in, reporting that his aircraft was an American aircraft. Enterprise later participated in the first offensive actions against Japan, launching attacks against the Marshall Islands, Wake, and Marcus Island.

Yorktown transferred to the Pacific on 16 December 1941 and later raided the Gilbert Islands in the same operation as Enterprise. Along with Lexington, she raided bases in New Guinea, then participated in the Battle of the Coral Sea. Her planes helped sink the Japanese aircraft carrier Shōhō and damaged the carrier Shōkaku. Damaged by Japanese carrier aircraft, Yorktown returned to Pearl Harbor and was hastily repaired in time to participate in the Battle of Midway.

Hornet spent the first months of the war training in Norfolk, Virginia, before being assigned to the Doolittle Raid. Loaded with a squadron of B-25 bombers and escorted by Enterprise, the ship launched the first air raids against the Japanese mainland.

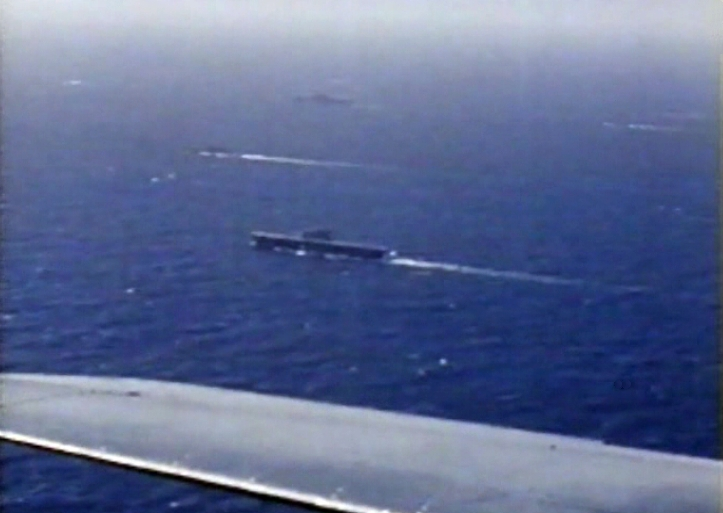
Enterprise and Hornet underway in May 1942

All three ships of the class saw action during the Battle of Midway (4–7 June 1942), Enterprise and Yorktown aircraft were responsible for sinking all four Japanese carriers engaged in the battle, while Hornet assisted in the sinking of one heavy cruiser and severely damaging another. All three carriers suffered severe losses among their air groups, most notably Hornet's Torpedo Squadron 8, which lost 15 aircraft with only a single surviving airman. Yorktown was damaged by aerial bombs and torpedoes and abandoned on 4 June. Later remanned by repair crews, the ship was spotted and torpedoed by a Japanese submarine and eventually sank on 7 June 1942.

Enterprise was assigned to the invasion of Guadalcanal and participated in preliminary strikes on the island. She suffered moderate damage during the Battle of the Eastern Solomons, but she was repaired in time to join Hornet in the Battle of the Santa Cruz Islands. Hornet was severely damaged during the latter engagement and had to be abandoned. Attempts to scuttle the ship by her escorts failed, and she was left adrift before finally being sunk by Japanese destroyers on 27 October 1942. Enterprise was again damaged during the battle, but was repaired enough to deliver her air group to Guadalcanal, where it participated in the Naval Battle of Guadalcanal. Enterprise aircraft assisted in finishing off the heavily damaged battleship Hiei and were instrumental in destroying the Japanese transport fleet, thereby ending Japan's last serious attempt at reclaiming the island.

After a lengthy overhaul and repair period at Bremerton, Washington, Enterprise joined the Central Pacific Fleet as part of the Fast Carrier Task Force. She participated in every major invasion of the Central Pacific campaign, including the Battle of the Philippine Sea and the Battle of Leyte Gulf. Her air groups contributed to the development of carrier night operations, executing a night air raid on Truk Lagoon and operating as a specialized night air group towards the end of the war.

Enterprise was finally put out of action on 14 May 1945, when she was struck in the forward elevator by a kamikaze aircraft flown by Japanese pilot Lt. Shunsuke Tomiyasu, which destroyed the elevator and severely damaged her hangar deck. She was still out of action on V-J Day, but was subsequently fitted out for Operation Magic Carpet, ferrying over 10,000 veterans home from Europe.

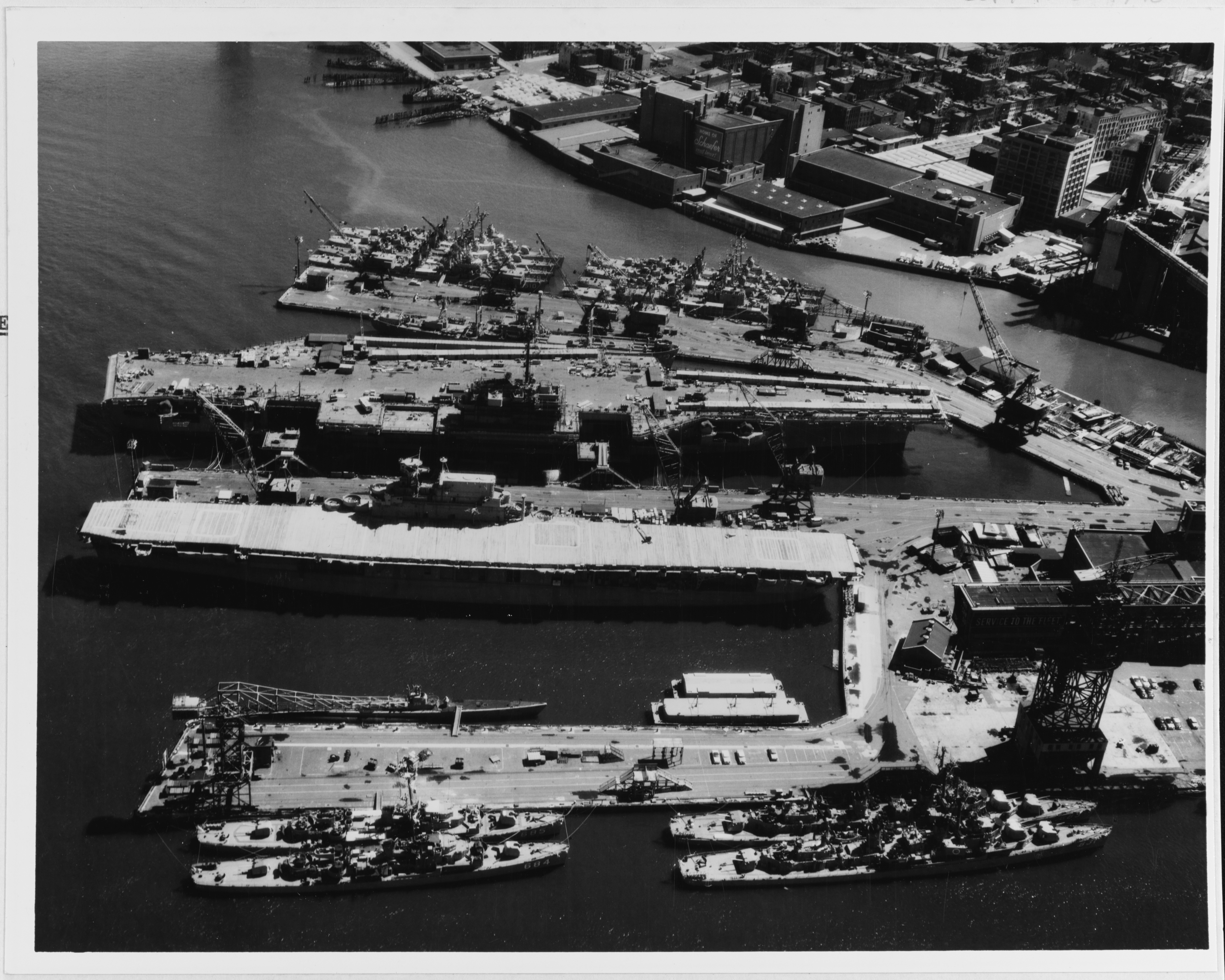
Enterprise laid up in 1958

By the end of World War II, Enterprise had been considerably modified. Her final displacement was 32,060 tons and her final armament was eight single 5-inch/38 caliber DP guns, 40 40 mm Bofors AA guns, six quad and eight twin (replacing the ineffective 1.1"/75 caliber gun quad mounts with which the Yorktown class had initially been fitted) and 50 single 20 mm Oerlikon AA cannons. The Yorktown ships had proved to be vulnerable to torpedoes, and while undergoing repairs at Bremerton, Washington, from July to October, 1943, Enterprise received an extensive refit, which included an antitorpedo blister that significantly improved her underwater protection.

With the commissioning of the more advanced Essex and Midway-class carriers, Enterprise was surplus for postwar needs. She entered New York Naval Shipyard on 18 January 1946 for deactivation, and was decommissioned on 17 February 1947. Stricken from the list in 1959 after multiple attempts to preserve her as a museum and memorial, ex-Enterprise met her fate in the breaker's yards at Kearny, New Jersey, in 1960, although several artifacts were retained.

== See also ==
- List of ship classes of the Second World War
