= Jerry Olszewski =

American football coach (c. 1968)

Current position
- Title: Head coach
- Team: Augustana (SD)
- Conference: NSIC
- Record: 100–49

Biographical details
- Born: c. 1968 (age 57–58)
- Education: University of Wisconsin–Stevens Point (1993); Minnesota State University, Mankato (1995)

Playing career
- 1987–1990: Wisconsin–Stevens Point
- Position: Defensive back

Coaching career (HC unless noted)
- 1991–1992: Wisconsin–Stevens Point (GA)
- 1993–1996: Minnesota State (assistant)
- 1997: Cal Lutheran (DL)
- 1998: Green Bay Bombers (OC/ST)
- 1999–2001: Minnesota State (assistant)
- 2006–2007: Wisconsin–Stevens Point (DC)
- 2008–2012: St. Olaf
- 2013–present: Augustana (SD)

Head coaching record
- Overall: 132–67
- Tournaments: 1–5 (NCAA D-II playoffs)

Accomplishments and honors

Championships
- 4 NSIC (2021, 2023, 2024, 2026); 2 NSIC South Division (2021, 2026)

Jerry Olszewski (born c. 1968) is an American football coach. He is the head football coach for Augustana University, a position he has held since 2013. He was previously the head coach for the St. Olaf Oles football team from 2008 to 2012. He also coached for Wisconsin–Stevens Point, Minnesota State, Cal Lutheran, and the Green Bay Bombers of the Professional Indoor Football League (PIFL). He played college football at Wisconsin–Stevens Point as a defensive back.

== Head coaching record ==
Year	Team	Overall	Conference	Standing	Bowl/playoffs	AFCA^{#}	D2^{°}
St. Olaf Oles (Minnesota Intercollegiate Athletic Conference) (2008–2012)
2008	St. Olaf	6–4	4–4	T–5th			
2009	St. Olaf	5–5	3–5	T–4th			
2010	St. Olaf	6–4	4–4	T–4th			
2011	St. Olaf	8–2	6–2	T–2nd			
2012	St. Olaf	7–3	5–3	T–4th			
St. Olaf:		32–18	22–18				
Augustana (South Dakota) Vikings (Northern Sun Intercollegiate Conference) (2013–present)
2013	Augustana	4–7	4–7 / 2–5	T–10th / 7th (South)			
2014	Augustana	6–5	6–5 / 3–4	T–5th / 4th (South)			
2015	Augustana	9–3	9–2 / 6–1	T–2nd / T–1st (South)	L NCAA Division II First Round	24	
2016	Augustana	8–3	8–3 / 5–2	T–3rd / T–2nd (South)			
2017	Augustana	4–7	4–7 / 2–5	11th / 6th (South)			
2018	Augustana	7–4	7–4 / 4–3	T–5th / T–3rd (South)			
2019	Augustana	9–3	9–2 / 6–1	2nd / 2nd (South)	L NCAA Division II First Round		
2020	No team—COVID-19						
2021	Augustana	9–3	9–2 / 5–1	T–1st / 1st (South)	L NCAA Division II First Round		
2022	Augustana	7–4	7–4 / 3–3	7th / 5th (South)			
2023	Augustana	11–2	9–1	1st	L NCAA Division II Second Round	13	15
2024	Augustana	8–4	8–2	1st	L NCAA Division II First Round	25	23
2025	Augustana	9–2	8–2 / 4–2	2nd / 3rd (South)		25	25
2026	Augustana	9–2	8–2 / 5–1	T–1st / T–1st (South)			
Augustana:		100–49	97–43				
Total:		132–67					
National championship Conference title Conference division title or championship game berth
