= Bloomsburg Area School District =

School district in Pennsylvania

Coordinates: 41.00446°N 76.44302°W

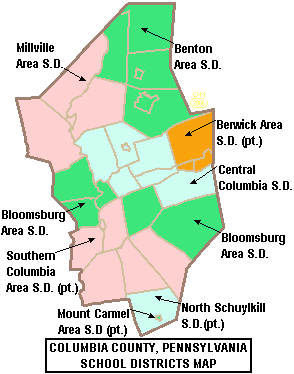

Address
- 728 East Fifth Street Bloomsburg, Columbia County, Pennsylvania, 17815-2305; United States

District information
- Type: Public

Other information
- Website: www.bloomsd.org

The Bloomsburg Area School District is a small, suburban/rural public school district. The district is one of the 500 school districts of Pennsylvania. The Bloomsburg Area School District serves the Town of Bloomsburg and Beaver Township, Hemlock Township, Main Township and Montour Township in Columbia County, Pennsylvania. The district encompasses approximately 81 square miles (210 km^{2}). According to 2000 federal census data, it served a resident population of 17,860. By 2010, the district's population increased to 20,654 people. The educational attainment levels for the district's population (25 years old and over) were 91.5% high school graduates and 26.4% college graduates.

According to the Pennsylvania Budget and Policy Center, 49.6% of the Bloomsburg Area School District's pupils lived at 185% or below the Federal Poverty level as shown by their eligibility for the federal free or reduced price school meal programs in 2012. In 2009, the district residents' per capita income was $14,741, while the median family income was $42,136 a year. In the Commonwealth, the median family income was $49,501 and the United States median family income was $49,445, in 2010. Bloomsburg University is located in the community.

According to District officials, in 2011-12, Bloomsburg Area School District provided basic educational services to 1,628 pupils. The district employed: 136 teachers, 93 full-time and part-time support personnel, and 8 administrators. The district received $8.4 million in state funding in the 2011-12 school year. For the school year 2007-08, Bloomsburg Area School District provided basic educational services to 1,838 pupils. In 2007-08, it employed: 143 teachers, 108 full-time and part-time support personnel, and 6 administrators. Bloomsburg Area School District received more than $7.8 million in state funding for school year 2007-08.

Bloomsburg Area School District operates: three elementary schools (grades Kindergarten through 5th), the largest being Memorial Elementary School, W.W. Evans Elementary School and Beaver Main Elementary School. The three elementary schools feed into the single Bloomsburg Middle school (grades 6th, 7th and 8th). High school aged students have the choice of attending Bloomsburg Area High School, attending a cyber charter school or transferring to the Columbia-Montour Area Vocational-Technical School which is a regional technical school for training in the trades. Bloomsburg Area High School underwent major recent renovations in summer 2006 through fall 2008.

The Central Susquehanna Intermediate Unit IU16 provides the district with a wide variety of services like specialized education for disabled students and hearing, speech and visual disability services and professional development for staff and faculty.

== Extracurriculars ==
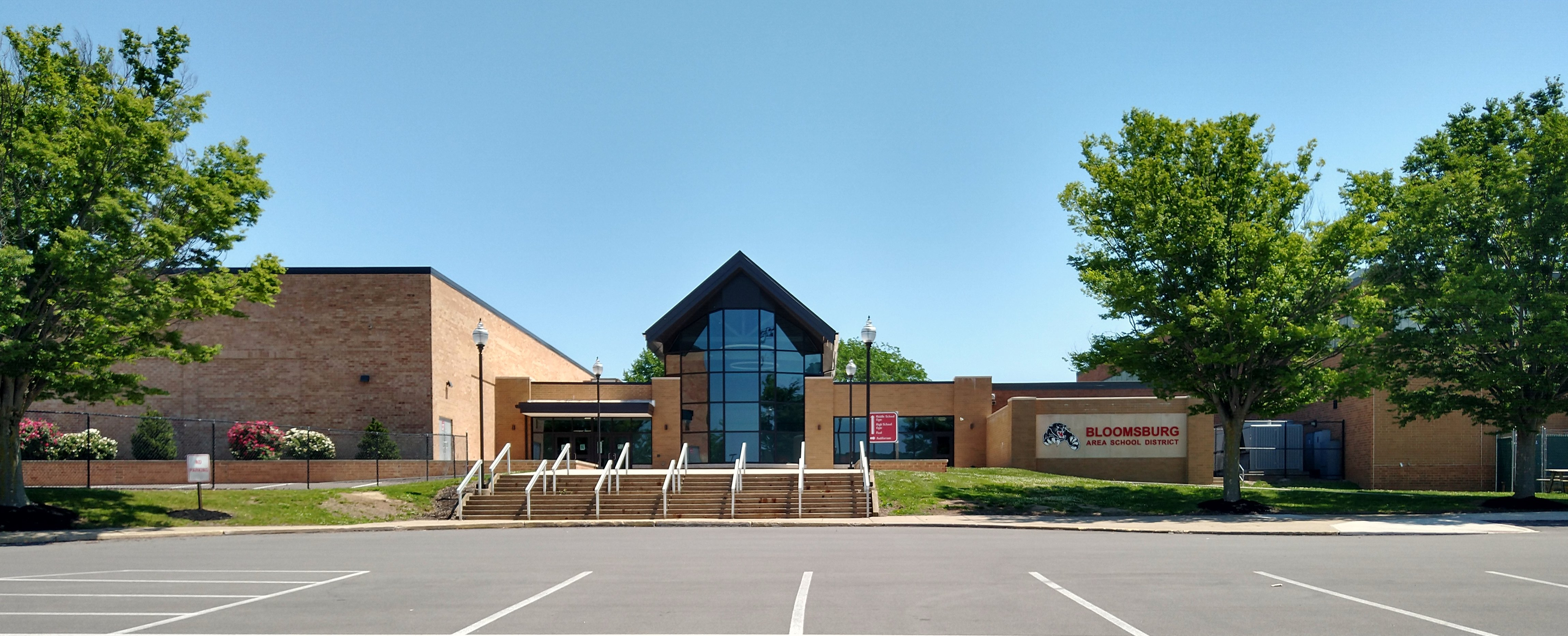
Building in the Bloomsburg Area School District

Bloomsburg Area School District offers a wide variety of clubs, activities and interscholastic sports. Varsity and junior varsity athletic activities are under the Pennsylvania Interscholastic Athletic Association and the regional Pennsylvania Heartland Athletic Conference. The Pennsylvania Heartland Athletic Conference is a voluntary association of 25 PIAA high schools within the central Pennsylvania region.

=== Sports ===
The district funds:

Boys

- Baseball - AA
- Basketball- AA
- Cross Country - Class A
- Football - A
- Golf - AA
- Soccer - A
- Swimming and Diving - Class AA
- Tennis - AA
- Track and Field - AA
- Wrestling - AA

Girls

- Basketball - AA
- Cross Country - A
- Field Hockey - AA
- Golf - AA
- Soccer (Fall) - A
- Softball - A
- Swimming and Diving - AA
- Girls' Tennis - AA
- Track and Field - AA

Middle School Sports

Boys

- Basketball
- Cross Country
- Football
- Wrestling

Girls

- Basketball
- Cross Country
- Field Hockey

According to PIAA directory July 2012
