= Lyle Eidsness =

American football coach

Biographical details
- Born: June 14, 1941 (age 85)

Coaching career (HC unless noted)
- 1965–1967: Thompson HS (IA)
- 1968–1970: Sheldon HS (IA)
- 1971–1976: St. Peter HS (MN)
- 1977–1979: Wisconsin–Stout
- 1980: Morningside
- 1981–1984: Augustana (SD)
- 1989–1990: Sioux Falls (OC)
- 1998–2001: Ferris State (assistant)
- 2004–2007: Southwest Minnesota State (ST/RB)

Head coaching record
- Overall: 31–53 (college)

Lyle Eidsness (born June 14, 1941) is an American former football coach. He served as the head football coach at the University of Wisconsin–Stout, Morningside College, and Augustana College in Sioux Falls, South Dakota, compiling a career college football coaching record of 31–53.

== Coaching career ==
Eidsness was the head football coach at Morningside College in Sioux City, Iowa. He held that position for the 1980 season. His coaching record at Morningside was 3–8.

== Head coaching record ==
=== College ===
Year	Team	Overall	Conference	Standing	Bowl/playoffs
Wisconsin–Stout Blue Devils (Wisconsin Intercollegiate Athletic Conference) (1977–1979)
1977	Wisconsin–Stout	2–8	2–6	8th	
1978	Wisconsin–Stout	7–3	5–3	4th	
1979	Wisconsin–Stout	6–4	4–4	T–4th	
Wisconsin–Stout:		15–15	11–13		
Morningside Chiefs (North Central Conference) (1980)
1980	Morningside	2–8	0–7	8th	
Morningside:		2–8	0–7		
Augustana (South Dakota) Vikings (North Central Conference) (1981–1984)
1981	Augustana	3–7	2–5	T–7th	
1982	Augustana	4–7	2–5	7th	
1983	Augustana	5–6	4–5	T–4th	
1984	Augustana	1–10	0–9	10th	
Augustana:		13–30	8–24		
Total:		30–53			
