= John Mohring (linebacker, born 1984) =

American gridiron football player (born 1984)

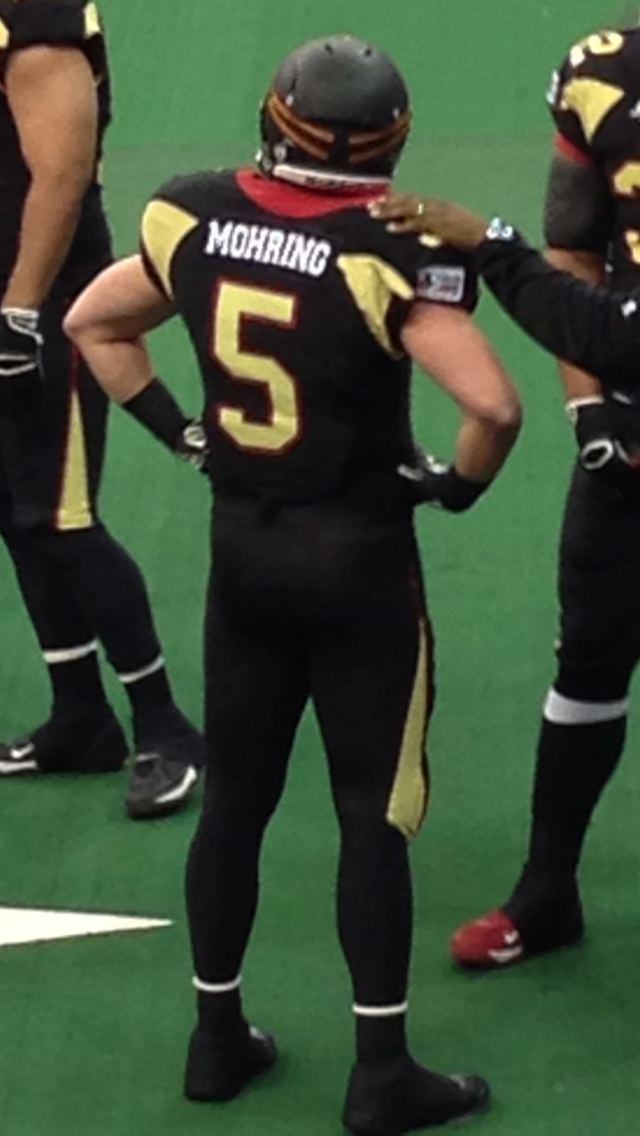
- Mohring with the Iowa Barnstormers in 2013

No. 23, 5
- Position: Linebacker

Personal information
- Born: August 31, 1984 (age 42); Naples, Florida, U.S.
- Listed height: 6 ft 1 in (1.85 m)
- Listed weight: 220 lb (100 kg)

Career information
- College: Georgia Southern
- NFL draft: 2007: undrafted

Career history
- Orlando Predators (2008); Grand Rapids Rampage (2008); Bloomington Extreme (2009); Montreal Alouettes (2009–2010); Iowa Barnstormers (2011–2013)

Career AFL statistics
- Tackles: 119.5
- Forced fumbles: 2
- Recovered fumbles: 2
- Interceptions: 5
- Touchdowns: 4
- Stats at ArenaFan.com

John Mohring Jr. (born August 31, 1984) is an American former professional football linebacker who played in the Canadian Football League (CFL) and Arena Football League (AFL). He played college football for the Georgia Southern Eagles.

== Collegiate career ==
At Georgia Southern, Mohring competed for four years and recorded 302 tackles, tying for fifth all-time in school history. He was honored by being named the Football Coaches Association Division I-AA All American team for the 2006 season.

== Professional career ==
After going undrafted in the 2007 NFL draft, Mohring participated in rookie mini-camp on a tryout basis with both the Buffalo Bills and Tampa Bay Buccaneers.

Mohring was also a member of the Orlando Predators, Grand Rapids Rampage, Bloomington Extreme, Montreal Alouettes, and Iowa Barnstormers.

== Coaching career ==
Mohring was an assistant coach at Arkansas State University. He is currently the Head Coach at Wayne County High School in Jesup, Georgia.

== Family ==
His father John Sr. played for the Cleveland Browns and Detroit Lions. His cousin Michael Mohring played for the Oakland Raiders and San Diego Chargers.
