= Ottumwa Regional Airport =

- IATA: OTM; ICAO: KOTM; FAA LID: OTM

Summary
- Airport type: Public
- Owner: City of Ottumwa
- Serves: Ottumwa, Iowa
- Elevation AMSL: 845 ft (258 m)
- Coordinates: 41°06′24″N 092°26′53″W

Map
- Location within Iowa Location within the United States

Runways
Direction	Length		Surface
Direction	ft	m	Surface
13/31	5,885	1,794	Asphalt/concrete
4/22	4,600	1,402	Asphalt

Statistics
- Aircraft operations (2015): 16,450
- Based aircraft (2017): 25
- Source: Federal Aviation Administration

Ottumwa Regional Airport (IATA: OTM, ICAO: KOTM, FAA LID: OTM), formerly Ottumwa Industrial Airport, is six miles northwest of Ottumwa, in Wapello County, Iowa, United States. The airport is owned by the City of Ottumwa and is operated by the Airport Advisory Board. It is listed as a general aviation airport in the National Plan of Integrated Airport System (NPIAS) and as an Enhanced Service Airport in the Iowa Aviation System Plan.

== History ==
=== Naval base ===
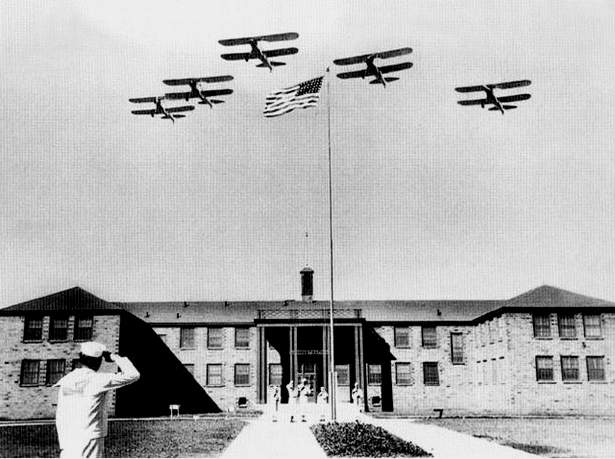
Trainer aircraft over Administration Building

Naval Air Station Ottumwa (NAS Ottumwa) was constructed as a Naval Training Center shortly after America's entry into World War II. The Navy, faced with providing aviators and support personnel for a two-front war, began a massive campaign of rapid expansion. On April 15, 1942, the U.S. Navy Site Selection Board met with Ottumwa city officials and determined a 1,400-acre tract of land a few miles north of the city would be a suitable location for a primary flight training facility. Based on their recommendation, Navy Secretary Frank Knox approved the location on July 9, 1942, and on August 6, 1942, groundbreaking for the base was held. The first group of Naval Aviation Cadets arrived at the base on March 10, 1943, and flight training officially began four days later. Another first for NAS Ottumwa occurred on May 30, 1943, when the first group of U.S. Navy WAVES arrived. At its peak, NAS Ottumwa was averaging one thousand flight hours per day, and over 600,000 flight hours logged by the time the base was closed. Aircraft used in flight training were mostly the SNJ, the N3N Canary, and the N2S Kaydet. Around sixty buildings—hangars, control tower, barracks, classrooms and sundry others—were built for the Navy's use. The base avenues were named for U.S. Navy aircraft carriers that served early in World War II: Enterprise, Hornet, Langley, Lexington, Wasp and Yorktown. Streets were named for U.S. Navy Admirals Dewey, Farragut, Moffett, and Sims along with Marine Corps General Smedley Butler and American Revolutionary War naval hero John Paul Jones.

One thing that set NAS Ottumwa apart from most other temporary Naval air training facilities around the nation was the quality of materiels used in construction. Wood-frame, clapboard-sided buildings were the norm at most bases, However concerned about the poor quality of wood available for base construction due to a nationwide shortage and the delays that might ensue at NAS Ottumwa, the base commander instead sought out other construction materiels. Ottumwa Brick and Tile, a factory located not far from the NAS Ottumwa site, provided high-quality, durable brick for the base construction. Because of that, several of the buildings, approximately fourteen in various states of disrepair, remain. A series of 19 auxiliary landing strips, mostly unpaved, were also established within a 25-mile radius of Ottumwa.

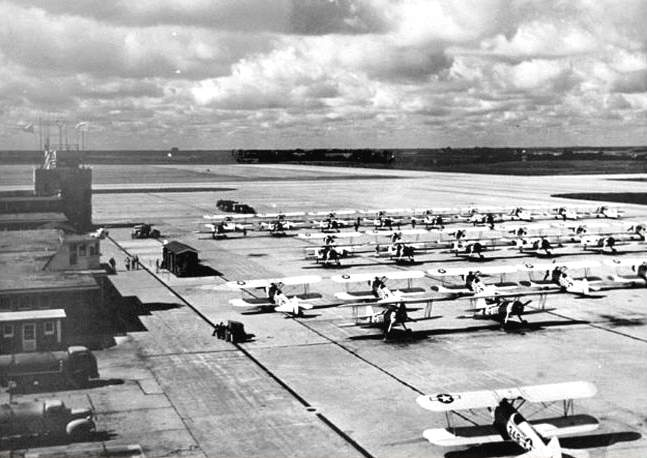
Flightline at NAS Ottumwa, mid-1940s

Among the thousands of Navy personnel who served at the base was Richard M. Nixon, later U.S. vice-president and president. Nixon was stationed at NAS Ottumwa from October 1942 until May 1943. Several other notables also served at NAS Ottumwa, including Scott Carpenter, one of the seven Project Mercury astronauts and the second American to orbit the Earth. College Football Hall of Famer Bob Steuber, and Jesse L. Brown, the U.S. Navy's first African-American pilot. In all, over 4,600 naval aviators earned their "wings of gold" at NAS Ottumwa.

With the end of World War II, NAS Ottumwa changed from a flight training role to classroom-based pre-flight training on December 7, 1945. On May 20, 1947, the U.S Secretary of the Navy ordered that the U.S. Navy Pre-Flight school at NAS Ottumwa be moved to NAS Pensacola. This was completed by October 1947, with the last Navy plane leaving Ottumwa on October 2. The City of Ottumwa acquired the base by lease on October 20, 1947. Outright ownership would be granted to the city on September 16, 1957.

Efforts to save part of the airport's naval aviation past are currently underway. The Administration Building from NAS Ottumwa is being restored by the non-profit group Friends of the Naval Air Station Ottumwa. The building, which had been unused since 1984, was in a state of considerable disrepair when the group took over its care. Once renovations are done it will repurposed as a Naval air and space museum. In June, 2013 the administration building was approved for listing on the National Register of Historic Places. It is one of only fourteen buildings built for and used by NAS Ottumwa still existing.

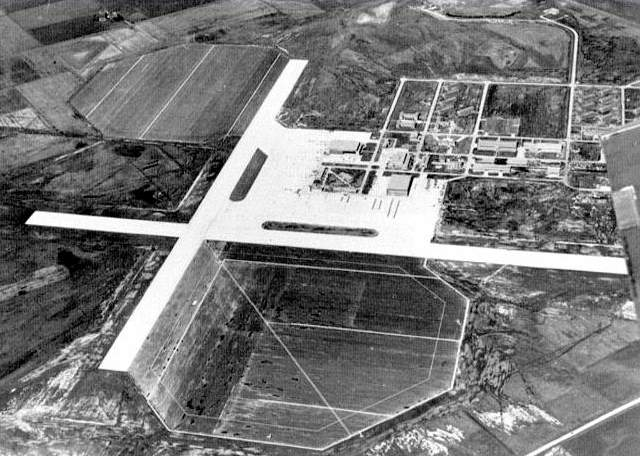
NAS Ottumwa, mid-1940s

=== Civil use ===
In 1947, Mid-Continent Airlines began flying to Ottumwa; in 1956, successor Braniff Airlines was replaced by Ozark Air Lines. Ozark Air Lines ended service to Ottumwa in 1979, replaced by Mississippi Valley Airlines until 1983. In 1985, Ottumwa Industrial Airport was served by Great Lakes Aviation, that service ending in 2001. Ottumwa has had no airline service since then.

The Antique Airplane Association was located at the airport in 1970.

In 2002, the City of Ottumwa, in conjunction with the Federal Aviation Administration built a new terminal at the airport, replacing the World War II-era operations building that had served as the terminal. The new facility cost nearly $1 million. The airport was renamed in 2008 from Ottumwa Industrial Airport to Ottumwa Regional Airport.

Ottumwa Regional Airport received a $3.9 million renovation in 2009. Most of the work centered on repaving and extending runway 4/22 with an asphalt surface, as well as adding a new parallel taxiway and upgrading lighting.

A non-profit called Friends of NAS Ottumwa was founded in 2011 to restore the former base administration building. A reproduction cupola, built to replace a former one that went missing, was installed on the building in 2013. By March 2018, new columns had been installed and the group was in the process of buying the building from the city with the eventual goal of opening a museum.

== Other uses ==
Since being taken over by the city of Ottumwa, the facility has seen many non-aviation uses, many related to education. Ottumwa Industrial Park, next to the airport on land originally part of NAS Ottumwa, has attracted manufacturing and office buildings to the area. A Job Corps training facility opened in the park in 2012. The largest educational presence is Indian Hills Community College. Their "North Campus", one of two in Ottumwa, offers education programs in aviation maintenance technology, pilot training, and avionics technology, as well as automotive collision repair, commercial driver training and welding.

== Facilities ==
The airport covers 1,600 acres (650 ha) at an elevation of 845 feet (258 m). It has two runways: 13/31 is 5,885 by 150 feet (1,794 x 46 m) asphalt/concrete and 4/22 is 4,600 by 100 feet (1,402 x 30 m) asphalt. Runway 13/31 is the primary runway; Runway 31 has an ILS (Instrument Landing System).

In the year ending June 23, 2015, the airport had 16,450 general aviation aircraft operations, an average of 45 per day. In January 2017, 25 aircraft were based at this airport: 17 single-engine, 3 multi-engine and 5 jet.

== See also ==
- List of airports in Iowa
