= Augustana University Vikings football =

College football team

Augustana (South Dakota) Vikings football
- First season: 1920; 106 years ago
- Athletic director: Josh Morton
- Head coach: Jerry Olszewski; 11th season, 82–45 (.646)
- Location: Sioux Falls, South Dakota
- Stadium: Kirkeby–Over Stadium (capacity: 6,500)
- NCAA division: Division II
- Conference: NSIC
- Colors: Navy and gold
- All-time record: 459–497–15 (.480)
- Bowl record: 1–1 (.500)

Conference championships
- 8 SDIC (1932–1937, 1939, 1941); 2 NCC (1942, 1959); 2 NSIC (2023, 2024)

Division championships
- 2 NSIC South Division (2010, 2021)
- Rivalries: Sioux Falls
- Mascot: Vikings
- Website: goaugie.com

The Augustana Vikings football team represents Augustana University in college football at the NCAA Division II level. The Vikings are members of the Northern Sun Intercollegiate Conference (NSIC), fielding its team in the NSIC since 2008. The Vikings play their home games at Kirkeby–Over Stadium in Sioux Falls, South Dakota.

The team's head coach is Jerry Olszewski, who took over the position for the 2013 season.

== Conference affiliation ==
- Independent (1920–1921)
- South Dakota Intercollegiate Conference (1922–1941)
- North Central Conference (1942–2007)
- Northern Sun Intercollegiate Conference (2008–present)

== List of head coaches ==
=== Key ===
Key to symbols in coaches list
| General | | Overall | | Conference | | Postseason (Note: Although the first Rose Bowl Game was played in 1902, it has been continuously played since the 1916 game, and is recognized as the oldest bowl game by the NCAA. "—" indicates any season prior to 1916 when postseason games were not played.) | |
|---|---|---|---|---|---|---|---|
| No. | Order of coaches (Note: A running total of the number of head coaches, with coaches who served separate tenures being counted only once. Interim head coaches are represented with "Int" and are not counted in the running total. "—" indicates the team played but either without a coach or no coach is on record. "X" indicates an interim year without play.) | GC | Games coached | CW | Conference wins | PW | Postseason wins |
| DC | Division championships | OW | Overall wins | CL | Conference losses | PL | Postseason losses |
| CC | Conference championships | OL | Overall losses | CT | Conference ties | PT | Postseason ties |
| NC | National championships | OT | Overall ties (Note: Overtime rules in college football were introduced in 1996, making ties impossible in the period since.) | C% | Conference winning percentage | | |
| † | Elected to the College Football Hall of Fame | O% | Overall winning percentage (Note: When computing the win–loss percentage, a tie counts as half a win and half a loss.) | | | | |

=== Coaches ===
List of head football coaches showing season(s) coached, overall records, and conference records
| No. | Name | Season(s) | GC | OW | OL | OT | O% | CW | CL | CT | C% |
|---|---|---|---|---|---|---|---|---|---|---|---|
| 1 | Jorgen A. Johnson | 1920–1921 | 7 | 3 | 3 | 1 | 0.500 | – | – | – | – |
| 2 | Carl Anderson | 1922–1924 | 23 | 13 | 9 | 1 | 0.587 | 10 | 6 | 1 | 0.618 |
| 3 | Martin Cole | 1925–1926 | 16 | 5 | 11 | 0 | 0.313 | 4 | 10 | 0 | 0.286 |
| 4 | H. Paul Dee | 1927–1930 | 31 | 11 | 19 | 1 | 0.371 | 10 | 9 | 0 | 0.526 |
| 5 | Leonard A. Olson | 1931–1942 | 96 | 74 | 21 | 1 | 0.776 | 46 | 5 | 1 | 0.894 |
| 6 | Harry Lackey | 1945 | 4 | 1 | 3 | 0 | 0.250 | 0 | 0 | 0 | – |
| 7 | Leonard A. Olson | 1946 | 7 | 0 | 6 | 1 | 0.071 | 0 | 4 | 0 | .000 |
| 8 | Bob Fitch | 1947 | 8 | 3 | 5 | 0 | 0.375 | 2 | 3 | 0 | 0.400 |
| 9 | Jerry Thompson | 1948–1950 | 26 | 7 | 19 | 0 | 0.269 | 4 | 14 | 0 | 0.222 |
| 10 | Linn Wells | 1951–1952 | 17 | 3 | 14 | 0 | 0.176 | 1 | 10 | 0 | 0.091 |
| 11 | Vic Pederson | 1953 | 9 | 1 | 8 | 0 | 0.111 | 0 | 6 | 0 | .000 |
| 12 | Pinky Falgren | 1954–1955 | 18 | 3 | 13 | 2 | 0.222 | 1 | 10 | 1 | 0.125 |
| 13 | Bob Burns | 1956–1961 | 50 | 28 | 20 | 2 | 0.580 | 24 | 10 | 1 | 0.700 |
| 14 | Jim Malmquist | 1962–1968 | 63 | 21 | 41 | 1 | 0.341 | 11 | 30 | 1 | 0.274 |
| 15 | Ralph Starenko | 1969–1976 | 79 | 31 | 46 | 2 | 0.405 | 16 | 35 | 1 | 0.317 |
| 16 | Joel Swisher | 1977–1980 | 39 | 17 | 21 | 1 | 0.449 | 10 | 16 | 0 | 0.385 |
| 17 | Lyle Eidsness | 1981–1984 | 43 | 13 | 30 | 0 | 0.302 | 8 | 24 | 0 | 0.250 |
| 18 | Jim Heinitz | 1985–1992, 1996–2004 | 185 | 79 | 105 | 1 | 0.430 | 51 | 93 | 1 | 0.355 |
| 19 | Denny Moller | 1993–1995 | 31 | 11 | 19 | 1 | 0.371 | 8 | 18 | 1 | 0.903 |
| 20 | Brad Salem | 2005–2009 | 57 | 31 | 26 | 0 | 0.544 | 21 | 21 | 0 | 0.500 |
| 21 | Mike Aldrich | 2010–2012 | 35 | 22 | 13 | 0 | 0.629 | 20 | 11 | 0 | 0.645 |
| 22 | Jerry Olszewski | 2013–present | 115 | 82 | 45 | 0 | 0.646 | 80 | 39 | 0 | 0.672 |

== Year-by-year results ==
| National champions | Conference champions | Bowl game berth | Playoff berth |

| Season | Year | Head coach | Association | Division | Conference | Record | | | | | | | Postseason | Final ranking |
| Season | Year | Head coach | Association | Division | Conference | Overall | | | Conference | | | | Postseason | Final ranking |
| Season | Year | Head coach | Association | Division | Conference | Win | Loss | Tie | Finish | Win | Loss | Tie | Postseason | Final ranking |
Augustana Vikings
| 1920 | 1920 | Jorgen A. Johnson | NCAA | — | Independent | 1 | 1 | 0 | | | | | — | — |
| 1921 | 1921 | Jorgen A. Johnson | NCAA | — | Independent | 2 | 2 | 1 | | | | | — | — |
| 1922 | 1922 | Carl Anderson | NCAA | — | SDIC | 3 | 4 | 0 | 6th | 1 | 2 | 0 | — | — |
| 1923 | 1923 | Carl Anderson | NCAA | — | SDIC | 4 | 3 | 1 | T–5th | 3 | 3 | 1 | — | — |
| 1924 | 1924 | Carl Anderson | NCAA | — | SDIC | 6 | 2 | 0 | 2nd | 6 | 1 | 0 | — | — |
| 1925 | 1925 | Martin Cole | NCAA | — | SDIC | 4 | 4 | 0 | 7th | 3 | 4 | 0 | — | — |
| 1926 | 1926 | Martin Cole | NCAA | — | SDIC | 1 | 7 | 0 | 9th | 1 | 6 | 0 | — | — |
| 1927 | 1927 | H. Paul Dee | NCAA | — | SDIC | 2 | 4 | 0 | T–6th | 2 | 3 | 0 | — | — |
| 1928 | 1928 | H. Paul Dee | NCAA | — | SDIC | 3 | 4 | 1 | 5th | 3 | 2 | 0 | — | — |
| 1929 | 1929 | H. Paul Dee | NCAA | — | SDIC | 4 | 4 | 0 | 4th | 3 | 1 | 0 | — | — |
| 1930 | 1930 | H. Paul Dee | NCAA | — | SDIC | 2 | 7 | 0 | 7th | 2 | 3 | 0 | — | — |
| 1931 | 1931 | Leonard A. Olson | NCAA | — | SDIC | 2 | 5 | 0 | 6th | 2 | 2 | 0 | — | — |
| 1932 | 1932 | Leonard A. Olson | NCAA | — | SDIC | 6 | 1 | 0 | T–1st | 5 | 0 | 0 | Conference co-champion | — |
| 1933 | 1933 | Leonard A. Olson | NCAA | — | SDIC | 5 | 2 | 0 | T–1st | 4 | 0 | 0 | Conference co-champion | — |
| 1934 | 1934 | Leonard A. Olson | NCAA | — | SDIC | 6 | 2 | 0 | T–1st | 4 | 0 | 0 | Conference co-champions | — |
| 1935 | 1935 | Leonard A. Olson | NCAA | — | SDIC | 7 | 2 | 0 | T–1st | 5 | 0 | 0 | Conference co-champion | — |
| 1936 | 1936 | Leonard A. Olson | NCAA | — | SDIC | 8 | 1 | 0 | T–1st | 4 | 0 | 0 | Conference co-champion | — |
| 1937 | 1937 | Leonard A. Olson | NCAA | — | SDIC | 8 | 0 | 0 | 1st | 4 | 0 | 0 | Conference champion | — |
| 1938 | 1938 | Leonard A. Olson | NCAA | — | SDIC | 5 | 2 | 1 | 5th | 2 | 2 | 1 | — | — |
| 1939 | 1939 | Leonard A. Olson | NCAA | — | SDIC | 6 | 2 | 0 | 1st | 5 | 0 | 0 | Conference champions | — |
| 1940 | 1940 | Leonard A. Olson | NCAA | — | SDIC | 6 | 2 | 0 | 3rd | 4 | 1 | 0 | — | — |
| 1941 | 1941 | Leonard A. Olson | NCAA | — | SDIC | 7 | 2 | 0 | T–1st | 3 | 0 | 0 | Conference co-champions | — |
| 1942 | 1942 | Leonard A. Olson | NCAA | — | NCC | 8 | 0 | 0 | T–1st | 4 | 0 | 0 | Conference co-champion | — |
No team from 1943 to 1944
| 1945 | 1945 | Harry Lackey | NCAA | — | NCC | 1 | 3 | 0 | N/A | 0 | 0 | 0 | — | — |
| 1946 | 1946 | Leonard A. Olson | NCAA | — | NCC | 0 | 6 | 1 | 7th | 0 | 4 | 0 | — | — |
| 1947 | 1947 | Bob Fitch | NCAA | — | NCC | 3 | 5 | 0 | 5th | 2 | 3 | 0 | — | — |
| 1948 | 1948 | Jerry Thompson | NCAA | — | NCC | 3 | 6 | 0 | T–4th | 2 | 4 | 0 | — | — |
| 1949 | 1949 | Jerry Thompson | NCAA | — | NCC | 2 | 6 | 0 | 6th | 1 | 5 | 0 | — | — |
| 1950 | 1950 | Jerry Thompson | NCAA | — | NCC | 2 | 7 | 0 | 6th | 1 | 5 | 0 | — | — |
| 1951 | 1951 | Linn Wells | NCAA | — | NCC | 3 | 5 | 0 | 7th | 1 | 4 | 0 | — | — |
| 1952 | 1952 | Linn Wells | NCAA | — | NCC | 0 | 9 | 0 | 7th | 0 | 6 | 0 | — | — |
| 1953 | 1953 | Vic Pederson | NCAA | — | NCC | 1 | 8 | 0 | 7th | 0 | 6 | 0 | — | — |
| 1954 | 1954 | Pinky Falgren | NCAA | — | NCC | 1 | 7 | 1 | 7th | 0 | 5 | 1 | — | — |
| 1955 | 1955 | Pinky Falgren | NCAA | — | NCC | 2 | 6 | 1 | 6th | 1 | 5 | 0 | — | — |
| 1956 | 1956 | Bob Burns | NCAA | College Division | NCC | 6 | 3 | 0 | T–2nd | 4 | 2 | 0 | — | — |
| 1957 | 1957 | Bob Burns | NCAA | College Division | NCC | 0 | 7 | 0 | T–6th | 5 | 0 | 0 | — | — |
| 1958 | 1958 | Bob Burns | NCAA | College Division | NCC | 5 | 3 | 0 | T–3rd | 3 | 3 | 0 | — | — |
| 1959 | 1959 | Bob Burns | NCAA | College Division | NCC | 6 | 2 | 1 | 1st | 4 | 1 | 1 | Conference champion | — |
| 1960 | 1960 | Bob Burns | NCAA | College Division | NCC | 6 | 2 | 0 | T–2nd | 4 | 2 | 0 | — | — |
| 1961 | 1961 | Bob Burns | NCAA | College Division | NCC | 5 | 3 | 1 | T–3rd | 4 | 2 | 0 | — | — |
| 1962 | 1962 | Jim Malmquist | NCAA | College Division | NCC | 6 | 3 | 0 | 3rd | 4 | 2 | 0 | — | — |
| 1963 | 1963 | Jim Malmquist | NCAA | College Division | NCC | 2 | 8 | 0 | 5th | 2 | 4 | 0 | — | — |
| 1964 | 1964 | Jim Malmquist | NCAA | College Division | NCC | 1 | 8 | 0 | 7th | 0 | 6 | 0 | — | — |
| 1965 | 1965 | Jim Malmquist | NCAA | College Division | NCC | 1 | 6 | 1 | T–5th | 1 | 4 | 1 | — | — |
| 1966 | 1966 | Jim Malmquist | NCAA | College Division | NCC | 5 | 4 | 0 | T–4th | 2 | 4 | 0 | — | — |
| 1967 | 1967 | Jim Malmquist | NCAA | College Division | NCC | 4 | 5 | 0 | T–4th | 2 | 4 | 0 | — | — |
| 1968 | 1968 | Jim Malmquist | NCAA | College Division | NCC | 2 | 7 | 0 | 7th | 0 | 6 | 0 | — | — |
| 1969 | 1969 | Ralph Starenko | NCAA | College Division | NCC | 3 | 6 | 0 | 7th | 1 | 5 | 0 | — | — |
| 1970 | 1970 | Ralph Starenko | NCAA | College Division | NCC | 4 | 6 | 0 | 4th | 3 | 3 | 0 | — | — |
| 1971 | 1971 | Ralph Starenko | NCAA | College Division | NCC | 1 | 8 | 1 | 7th | 0 | 6 | 0 | — | — |
| 1972 | 1972 | Ralph Starenko | NCAA | College Division | NCC | 2 | 8 | 0 | T–7th | 1 | 6 | 0 | — | — |
| 1973 | 1973 | Ralph Starenko | NCAA | Division II | NCC | 6 | 3 | 1 | 5th | 3 | 3 | 1 | — | — |
| 1974 | 1974 | Ralph Starenko | NCAA | Division II | NCC | 4 | 6 | 0 | 7th | 2 | 5 | 0 | — | — |
| 1975 | 1975 | Ralph Starenko | NCAA | Division II | NCC | 7 | 3 | 0 | 3rd | 5 | 2 | 0 | — | — |
| 1976 | 1976 | Ralph Starenko | NCAA | Division II | NCC | 4 | 6 | 0 | 6th | 1 | 5 | 0 | — | — |
| 1977 | 1977 | Joel Swisher | NCAA | Division II | NCC | 7 | 4 | 0 | T–2nd | 4 | 3 | 0 | — | — |
| 1978 | 1978 | Joel Swisher | NCAA | Division II | NCC | 4 | 5 | 0 | 6th | 2 | 4 | 0 | — | — |
| 1979 | 1979 | Joel Swisher | NCAA | Division II | NCC | 4 | 5 | 0 | 6th | 2 | 4 | 0 | — | — |
| 1980 | 1980 | Joel Swisher | NCAA | Division II | NCC | 2 | 7 | 1 | 6th | 2 | 5 | 0 | — | — |
| 1981 | 1981 | Lyle Eidsness | NCAA | Division II | NCC | 3 | 7 | 0 | T–7th | 2 | 5 | 0 | — | — |
| 1982 | 1982 | Lyle Eidsness | NCAA | Division II | NCC | 4 | 7 | 0 | 7th | 2 | 5 | 0 | — | — |
| 1983 | 1983 | Lyle Eidsness | NCAA | Division II | NCC | 5 | 6 | 0 | T–4th | 4 | 5 | 0 | — | — |
| 1984 | 1984 | Lyle Eidsness | NCAA | Division II | NCC | 1 | 10 | 0 | 10th | 0 | 9 | 0 | — | — |
| 1985 | 1985 | Jim Heinitz | NCAA | Division II | NCC | 1 | 9 | 0 | 10th | 1 | 8 | 0 | — | — |
| 1986 | 1986 | Jim Heinitz | NCAA | Division II | NCC | 5 | 6 | 0 | T–7th | 3 | 6 | 0 | — | — |
| 1987 | 1987 | Jim Heinitz | NCAA | Division II | NCC | 2 | 9 | 0 | 10th | 1 | 8 | 0 | — | — |
| 1988 | 1988 | Jim Heinitz | NCAA | Division II | NCC | 8 | 4 | 0 | T–2nd | 6 | 3 | 0 | L NCAA Division II First Round | 18 |
| 1989 | 1989 | Jim Heinitz | NCAA | Division II | NCC | 8 | 3 | 1 | T–2nd | 6 | 2 | 1 | L NCAA Division II First Round | 11 |
| 1990 | 1990 | Jim Heinitz | NCAA | Division II | NCC | 5 | 5 | 0 | T–4th | 5 | 4 | 0 | — | — |
| 1991 | 1991 | Jim Heinitz | NCAA | Division II | NCC | 0 | 10 | 0 | 10th | 0 | 8 | 0 | — | — |
| 1992 | 1992 | Jim Heinitz | NCAA | Division II | NCC | 8 | 3 | 0 | T–3rd | 6 | 3 | 0 | — | — |
| 1993 | 1993 | Denny Moller | NCAA | Division II | NCC | 4 | 7 | 0 | 8th | 3 | 6 | 0 | — | — |
| 1994 | 1994 | Denny Moller | NCAA | Division II | NCC | 4 | 6 | 0 | T–7th | 3 | 6 | 0 | — | — |
| 1995 | 1995 | Denny Moller | NCAA | Division II | NCC | 3 | 6 | 1 | 8th | 2 | 6 | 1 | — | — |
| 1996 | 1996 | Jim Heinitz | NCAA | Division II | NCC | 3 | 8 | 0 | 9th | 2 | 7 | 0 | — | — |
| 1997 | 1997 | Jim Heinitz | NCAA | Division II | NCC | 5 | 6 | 0 | T–6th | 3 | 6 | 0 | — | — |
| 1998 | 1998 | Jim Heinitz | NCAA | Division II | NCC | 4 | 7 | 0 | 8th | 2 | 7 | 0 | — | — |
| 1999 | 1999 | Jim Heinitz | NCAA | Division II | NCC | 5 | 6 | 0 | T–6th | 3 | 6 | 0 | — | — |
| 2000 | 2000 | Jim Heinitz | NCAA | Division II | NCC | 7 | 4 | 0 | 5th | 5 | 4 | 0 | — | — |
| 2001 | 2001 | Jim Heinitz | NCAA | Division II | NCC | 5 | 5 | 0 | T–6th | 3 | 5 | 0 | — | — |
| 2002 | 2002 | Jim Heinitz | NCAA | Division II | NCC | 7 | 4 | 0 | T–4th | 4 | 4 | 0 | — | — |
| 2003 | 2003 | Jim Heinitz | NCAA | Division II | NCC | 3 | 8 | 0 | 7th | 1 | 6 | 0 | — | — |
| 2004 | 2004 | Jim Heinitz | NCAA | Division II | NCC | 3 | 8 | 0 | 7th | 0 | 6 | 0 | — | — |
| 2005 | 2005 | Brad Salem | NCAA | Division II | NCC | 6 | 5 | 0 | 6th | 2 | 4 | 0 | — | — |
| 2006 | 2006 | Brad Salem | NCAA | Division II | NCC | 5 | 6 | 0 | T–5th | 3 | 5 | 0 | — | — |
| 2007 | 2007 | Brad Salem | NCAA | Division II | NCC | 4 | 7 | 0 | 7th | 2 | 6 | 0 | — | — |
| 2008 | 2008 | Brad Salem | NCAA | Division II | NSIC | 8 | 4 | 0 | 3rd (South) | 7 | 3 | 0 | W Mineral Water | — |
| 2009 | 2009 | Brad Salem | NCAA | Division II | NSIC | 8 | 4 | 0 | T–2nd (South) | 7 | 3 | 0 | L Mineral Water | — |
| 2010 | 2010 | Mike Aldrich | NCAA | Division II | NSIC | 11 | 2 | 0 | 1st (South) | 9 | 1 | 0 | L NCAA Division II Quarterfinal | 6 |
| 2011 | 2011 | Mike Aldrich | NCAA | Division II | NSIC | 6 | 5 | 0 | 4th (South) | 6 | 4 | 0 | — | — |
| 2012 | 2012 | Mike Aldrich | NCAA | Division II | NSIC | 5 | 6 | 0 | 5th (South) | 5 | 6 | 0 | — | — |
| 2013 | 2013 | Jerry Olszewski | NCAA | Division II | NSIC | 4 | 7 | 0 | 7th (South) | 4 | 7 | 0 | — | — |
| 2014 | 2014 | Jerry Olszewski | NCAA | Division II | NSIC | 6 | 5 | 0 | 4th (South) | 6 | 5 | 0 | — | — |
| 2015 | 2015 | Jerry Olszewski | NCAA | Division II | NSIC | 9 | 3 | 0 | T–2nd (South) | 9 | 2 | 0 | L NCAA Division II First Round | 24 |
| 2016 | 2016 | Jerry Olszewski | NCAA | Division II | NSIC | 8 | 3 | 0 | T–2nd (South) | 8 | 3 | 0 | — | — |
| 2017 | 2017 | Jerry Olszewski | NCAA | Division II | NSIC | 4 | 7 | 0 | 6th (South) | 4 | 7 | 0 | — | — |
| 2018 | 2018 | Jerry Olszewski | NCAA | Division II | NSIC | 7 | 4 | 0 | T–3rd (South) | 7 | 4 | 0 | — | — |
| 2019 | 2019 | Jerry Olszewski | NCAA | Division II | NSIC | 9 | 3 | 0 | 2nd (South) | 9 | 2 | 0 | L NCAA Division II First Round | — |
No team in 2020 due to COVID-19.
| 2021 | 2021 | Jerry Olszewski | NCAA | Division II | NSIC | 9 | 3 | 0 | 1st (South) | 9 | 2 | 0 | L NCAA Division II First Round | — |
| 2022 | 2022 | Jerry Olszewski | NCAA | Division II | NSIC | 7 | 4 | 0 | 5th (South) | 7 | 4 | 0 | — | — |
| 2023 | 2023 | Jerry Olszewski | NCAA | Division II | NSIC | 11 | 2 | 0 | 1st | 9 | 1 | 0 | L NCAA Division II Second Round | 13 |
| 2024 | 2024 | Jerry Olszewski | NCAA | Division II | NSIC | 8 | 4 | 0 | 1st | 8 | 2 | 0 | L NCAA Division II First Round | 25 |
