= Mike Aldrich =

American football coach (born c. 1973)

Biographical details
- Born: c. 1973 (age 52–53); Burnsville, Minnesota, U.S.
- Education: St. Olaf College (1995, economics and social studies education); University of Minnesota (1999, kinesiology and sports management)

Playing career
- 1991–1994: St. Olaf

Coaching career (HC unless noted)
- 1995: St. Olaf (DE)
- 1996: St. Olaf (TE)
- 1997–1998: St. Olaf (LB)
- 1999: College of the Sequoias (DL)
- 2000: Cal Lutheran (ST/LB)
- 2001–2002: Sioux Falls Storm
- 2003: Augustana (SD) (DB)
- 2004: Louisville (GA)
- 2005–2009: Sioux Falls Storm (DC)
- 2010–2012: Augustana (SD)
- 2013–2014: Wayne State (NE) (DC/DB)
- 2015–2016: Southwest Minnesota State (DC/DL)
- 2017–2022: Minot State

Head coaching record
- Overall: 32–58 (college); 16–14 (indoor football)
- Tournaments: 1–1 (NCAA D-II playoffs); 1–1 (NIFL playoffs)

Accomplishments and honors

Championships
- 1 NSIC South Division (2010)

Michael Aldrich (born c. 1973) is an American football coach. He was the head coach for the Sioux Falls Storm of the National Indoor Football League (NIFL) from 2001 to 2002. He was also the head football coach for Augustana University in Sioux Falls, South Dakota, from 2010 to 2012 and Minot State University from 2017 to 2022. He previously coached for St. Olaf, College of the Sequoias, Cal Lutheran, Louisville, Wayne State (NE), and Southwest Minnesota State. He played college football for St. Olaf.

== Head coaching record ==
=== Indoor football ===
League	Team	Year	Regular season				Postseason			
League	Team	Year	Won	Lost	Win %	Finish	Won	Lost	Win %	Result
NIFL	Sioux Falls Storm	2001	8	8	.500	3rd in Central	1	1	.500	Lost to Wyoming Cavalry in Round 2
NIFL	Sioux Falls Storm	2002	8	6	.571	3rd in Western	—	—	—	—
Career total			16	14	.533		1	1	.500	

=== College ===
Year	Team	Overall	Conference	Standing	Bowl/playoffs	AFCA^{#}
Augustana (South Dakota) Vikings (Northern Sun Intercollegiate Conference) (2010–2012)
2010	Augustana	11–2	9–1	1st (South)	L NCAA Division II Quarterfinal	6
2011	Augustana	6–5	6–4	4th (South)		
2012	Augustana	5–6	5–6	5th (South)		
Augustana:		22–13	20–11			
Minot State Beavers (Northern Sun Intercollegiate Conference) (2017–2022)
2017	Minot State	3–8	3–8	6th (North)		
2018	Minot State	1–10	1–10	T–6th (North)		
2019	Minot State	3–8	3–8	6th (North)		
2020–21	No team—COVID-19					
2021	Minot State	2–9	2–9	6th (North)		
2022	Minot State	1–10	1–10	T–6th (North)		
Minot State:		10–45	10–45			
Total:		32–58				
National championship Conference title Conference division title or championship game berth
