= Jim Malmquist =

American football and ice hockey coach (1931–2016)

Biographical details
- Born: July 18, 1931; Brainerd, Minnesota, U.S.
- Died: August 17, 2016 (aged 85); Minnesota, U.S.

Playing career

Football
- 1949–1952: Gustavus Adolphus
- Position: Fullback

Coaching career (HC unless noted)

Football
- 1956–1958: Gustavus Adolphus (backfield)
- 1959–1961: Texas Lutheran
- 1962–1968: Augustana (SD)
- 1969–1973: Bemidji State

Ice hockey
- 1956–1959: Gustavus Adolphus

Administrative career (AD unless noted)
- 1974–1997: Gustavus Adolphus

Head coaching record
- Overall: 49–81–5 (football); 18–21 (ice hockey)

James Mansfield "Moose" Malmquist (July 18, 1931 – August 17, 2016) was an American football and ice hockey coach. He served as the head football coach at Texas Lutheran University in Seguin, Texasfrom 1959 to 1961, Augustana College—now known as Augustana University—in Sioux Falls, South Dakota from 1962 to 1968, and Bemidji State University in Bemidji, Minnesota from 1969 to 1973, compiling a career college football coaching record of 49–81–5. He was also the head ice hockey coach at Gustavus Adolphus College in St. Peter, Minnesota from 1956 to 1959, tallying a mark of 18–21.

== Head coaching record ==
Year	Team	Overall	Conference	Standing	Bowl/playoffs
Texas Lutheran Bulldogs (Independent) (1959–1961)
1959	Texas Lutheran	3–6–1			
1960	Texas Lutheran	5–4			
1961	Texas Lutheran	5–3–1			
Texas Lutheran:		13–13–2			
Augustana (South Dakota) Vikings (North Central Conference) (1962–1968)
1962	Augustana	6–3	4–2	3rd	
1963	Augustana	2–8	2–4	5th	
1964	Augustana	1–8	0–6	7th	
1965	Augustana	1–6–1	1–4–1	T–5th	
1966	Augustana	5–4	2–4	T–4th	
1967	Augustana	4–5	2–4	T–4th	
1968	Augustana	2–7	0–6	7th	
Augustana:		21–41–1	11–30–1		
Bemidji State Beavers (Northern Intercollegiate Conference) (1969–1973)
1969	Bemidji State	4–3–1	2–2–1	4th	
1970	Bemidji State	1–8	1–5	T–5th	
1971	Bemidji State	3–5–1	3–2–1	T–3rd	
1972	Bemidji State	2–7	1–5	6th	
1973	Bemidji State	5–4	2–4	T–4th	
Bemidji State:		15–27–2	9–18–2		
Total:		49–81–5			
