= Bloomsburg Area High School =

Coordinates: 40.990°N 76.455°W

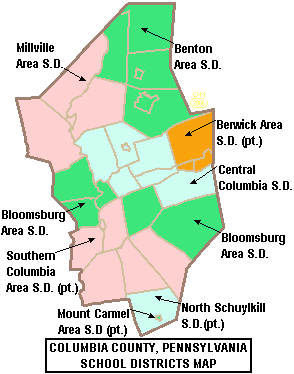

Location
- 1200 Railroad Street; Bloomsburg, Columbia County, Pennsylvania 17815-2305; United States

Information
- Type: Public
- School district: Bloomsburg Area School District
- Faculty: 36 teachers in 2012
- Teaching staff: 27.75 (FTE)
- Grades: 9th - 12th
- Enrollment: 389 (2023-2024)
- Student to teacher ratio: 14.02
- Colors: Red and white
- Mascot: Panther
- Team name: Panthers
- Newspaper: Red and White
- Feeder schools: Bloomsburg Area Middle School
- Website: hs.bloomsd.org

Bloomsburg Area High School is a small, rural and suburban public high school located at 1200 Railroad Street, Bloomsburg. In 2014, Bloomsburg Area High School reported an enrollment of 422 pupils in grades 9th through 12th.

It is the sole high school operated by Bloomsburg Area School District. High school aged students have the choice of attending Bloomsburg Area High School, attending a cyber charter school or transferring to the Columbia-Montour Area Vocational-Technical School which is a regional technical school for training in the trades.
