= USS Hornet (CV-8) =

Yorktown-class aircraft carrier of the US Navy

Coordinates: 8°38′23″S 166°42′34″E

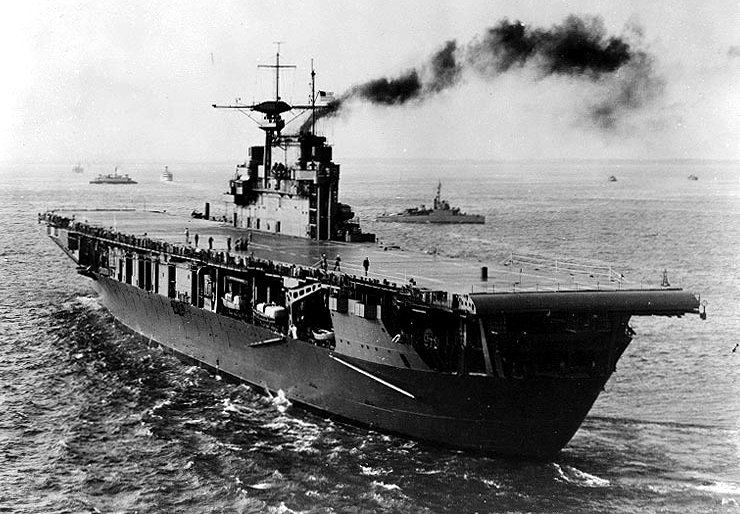
- USS Hornet (CV-8) shortly after completion

History

United States
- Name: Hornet
- Namesake: USS Hornet (1805)
- Ordered: 30 March 1939
- Builder: Newport News Shipbuilding Company
- Laid down: 25 September 1939
- Launched: 14 December 1940
- Sponsored by: Annie Reid Knox
- Commissioned: 20 October 1941
- Stricken: 13 January 1943
- Nickname(s): "Happy Hornet", and "Horny Maru"
- Honors and awards: 4 × battle stars
- Fate: Sunk in the Battle of the Santa Cruz Islands, 27 October 1942

General characteristics (as built)
- Class & type: Yorktown-class aircraft carrier
- Displacement: 20,000 long tons (20,321 t) (standard); 25,500 long tons (25,909 t) (full load)
- Length: 824 ft 9 in (251.38 m) (overall)
- Beam: 83 ft 3 in (25.37 m) (waterline); 114 ft (35 m) (overall)
- Draft: 28 ft (8.5 m) full load
- Installed power: 9 × Babcock & Wilcox boilers; 120,000 shp (89,000 kW)
- Propulsion: 4 shafts; 4 geared steam turbines
- Speed: 32.5 knots (60.2 km/h; 37.4 mph) (design)
- Range: 12,500 nmi (23,200 km; 14,400 mi) at 15 knots (28 km/h; 17 mph)
- Complement: 2,919 officers and enlisted (wartime)
- Armament: 8 × single 5 in (127 mm) DP guns; 4 × quadruple 1.1 in (28 mm) AA guns; 24 × single .50 in (12.7 mm) AA MGs
- Armor: Belt: 2.5–4 in (64–102 mm); Protected Deck: 1.5 in (38 mm); Bulkheads: 4 in (102 mm); Conning Tower: 4 in (102 mm); Steering Gear: 4 in (102 mm)
- Aircraft carried: 97 × aircraft
- Aviation facilities: 3 × aircraft elevators; 3 × aircraft catapults

USS Hornet (CV-8) was a Yorktown-class aircraft carrier. Commissioned a month before the Pearl Harbor attack, the ship spent three months in the waters around Norfolk, training and acquiring modern aircraft, before being dispatched to the Pacific in March 1942.

In April 1942, the ship, part of a task force that also included her sister ship USS Enterprise, launched the Doolittle Raid on Tokyo, then sortied in mid-May toward the South Pacific, before being abruptly recalled to Hawaii to participate in the Battle of Midway in June. After the victory at Midway, while the Pacific Fleet's other three carriers went south to support the early August invasion of Guadalcanal and Tulagi, in the Solomon Islands, Hornet was retained in Hawaii in reserve. This did not last; in late August, she was sent to join the other carriers, a move that proved necessary, as the other vessels, one by one, were disabled. By late September, Hornet was the only American fleet carrier active in the Pacific.

Hornet spent most of her time in the South Pacific patrolling the waters east of Guadalcanal, to help keep sea lanes open and offer general support. On 15 September, she was present when a Japanese submarine sank the carrier Wasp and scored hits on two other warships. On 5 October 1942, her task force sailed west to attack Japanese shipping and air facilities near the southeast end of Bougainville (the Buin-Faisi-Tonolai Raid). Later that month, at the Battle of the Santa Cruz Islands, she was irreparably damaged by enemy torpedo and dive bombers. Faced with an approaching Japanese surface force, Hornet was abandoned and later torpedoed and sunk by approaching Japanese destroyers. Hornet was in service for one year and six days, and was the last U.S. fleet carrier ever sunk by enemy fire. For these actions, she was awarded four service stars and a citation for the Doolittle Raid in 1942, and her Torpedo Squadron 8 received a Presidential Unit Citation for extraordinary heroism for its performance at the Battle of Midway.

In January 2019, the wreckage of the vessel was located near the Solomon Islands.

== Construction and commissioning ==
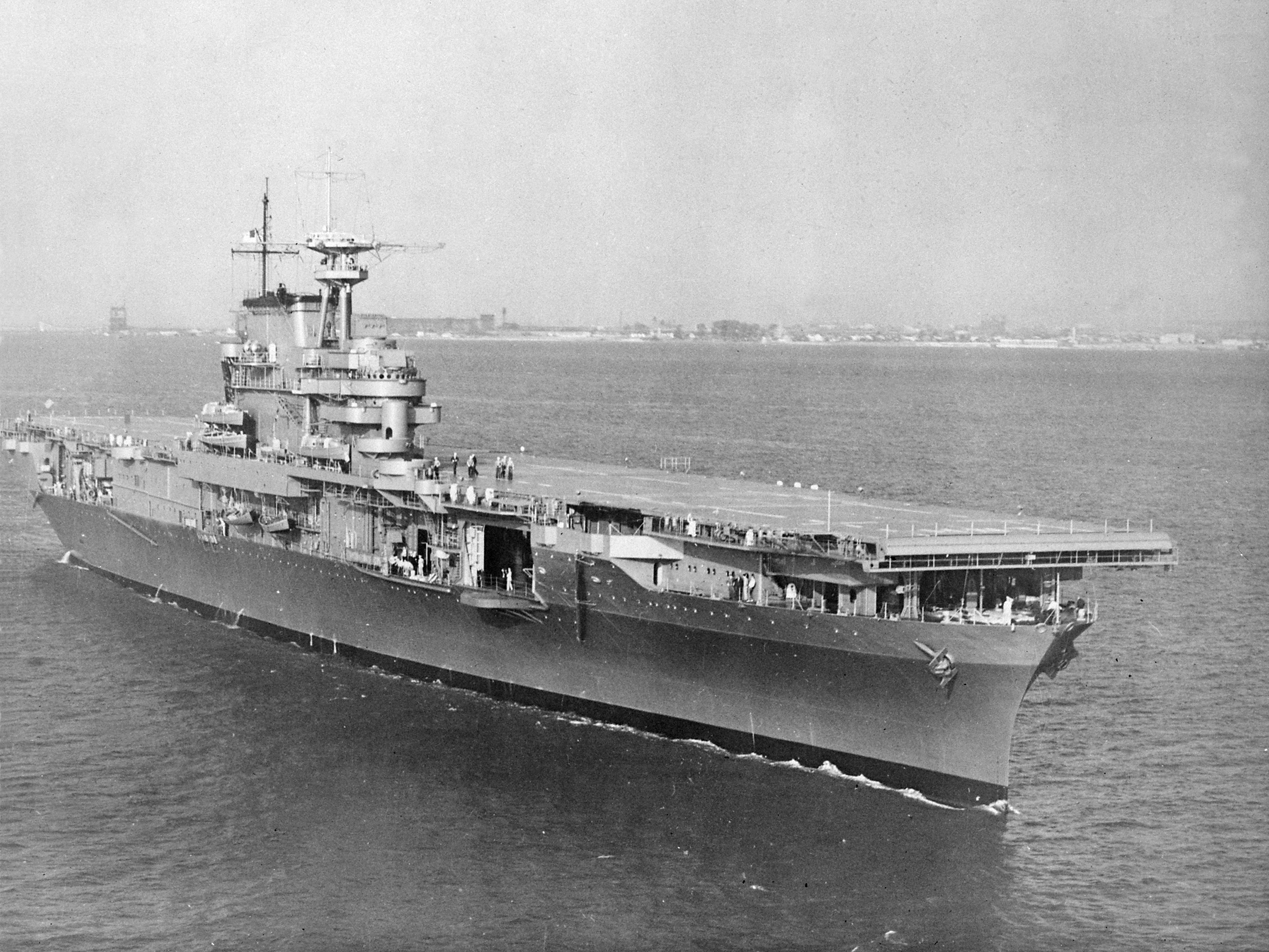
Hornet cruising off Hampton Roads in October 1941

Because of the limit on aggregate aircraft carrier tonnage included in the Washington Naval Treaty and subsequent London treaties, the United States had intended to build two Yorktown-class aircraft carriers and use the remaining allocated tonnage for a smaller, revised version of the same design, which eventually became Wasp. With war looming in Europe and the repudiation of the naval limitation treaties by Japan and Italy, the Navy's General Board decided to lay down a third carrier of the Yorktown design immediately - followed by the first carrier of the succeeding Essex class (CV-9). When the design was finalized, authorization from Congress came in the Naval Expansion Act of 1938.

Hornet had a length of 770 feet (235 m) at the waterline and 824 ft 9 in (251.38 m) overall. She had a beam of 83 ft 3 in (25.37 m) at the waterline, 114 ft (35 m) overall, with a draft of 24 ft 4 in (7.42 m) as designed and 28 ft (8.5 m) at full load. She displaced 20,000 long tons (20,321 t) at standard load and 25,500 long tons (25,900 t) at full load. She was designed for a ship's crew consisting of 86 officers and 1,280 men and an air complement consisting of 141 officers and 710 men.

She was powered by nine Babcock & Wilcox boilers providing steam at 400 psi (2,800 kPa) and 648 °F (342 °C) to four Parsons Marine geared steam turbines, each driving its own propeller. The turbines were designed to produce a total of 120,000 shaft horsepower [shp] (89,000 kW), giving her a range of 12,000 nautical miles (14,000 mi; 22,000 km) at a speed of 15 knots (17 mph; 28 km/h). She was designed to carry 4,280 long tons (4,350 t) of fuel oil and 178,000 US gallons (670,000 L) of aviation fuel (avgas). Her designed top speed was 32.5 knots (60.2 km/h; 37.4 mph). During sea trials, she produced 120,500 shp (89,900 kW) and reached 33.85 knots (62.69 km/h; 38.95 mph).

Hornet was equipped with eight 5-inch (127 mm)/38 caliber dual-purpose guns and 16 1.1-inch (28 mm)/75 caliber antiaircraft (AA) guns in quadruple mounts (four guns operating together). Originally, she had 24 M2 Browning .50-inch (12.7 mm) machine guns, but these were replaced in January 1942 with 30 20-mm Oerlikon AA cannons. An additional 1.1-inch (28 mm) quad mount was added later at her bow and two more 20 mm AA guns were added for a total of 32 mounts. In addition, her athwartships hangar-deck aircraft catapult was removed. In June 1942, following the battle of Midway, Hornet had a new CXAM radar installed atop her tripod mast, and her SC radar was relocated to her main mast. Unlike her sisters, Hornet's tripod mast and its signal bridge were not enclosed when the CXAM was installed, making her unique among the three ships.

Hornet had an armor belt that was 2.5–4.0 in (64–102 mm) thick on a backing of 30-pound (0.75-inch/19 mm) special treatment steel (STS). The flight and hangar decks were unarmored, though the protective deck was 60-pound (1.5-inch/38 mm) STS. Bulkheads had 4 in (100 mm) armor, while the conning tower had splinter protection only, in contrast with her sisters' 4 in (100 mm) armor on the sides with 2 in (51 mm) on top. The steering gear had 4 in (100 mm) protection on the sides with splinter protection on the deck.

Her flight deck was 814 ft × 86 ft (248 m × 26 m), and her hangar deck was 546 ft × 63 ft (166 m × 19 m) and 17 ft 3 in (5.26 m) high. She had three aircraft elevators, each 48 by 44 feet (15 by 13 m) with a lifting capacity of 17,000 lb (7,700 kg). She had two flight-deck and one hangar-deck hydraulic catapults equipped with the Mark IV Mod 3A arresting gear with a capability of 16,000 lb (7,300 kg) and 85 miles per hour (137 km/h). She was designed to host a carrier air group of 18 fighters, 18 bombers, 37 scout planes, 18 torpedo bombers, and six utility aircraft.

Hornet was laid down on 25 September 1939 by Newport News Shipbuilding of Newport News, Virginia, and was launched on 14 December 1940, sponsored by Annie Reid Knox, wife of Secretary of the Navy Frank M. Knox. She was commissioned at Naval Station Norfolk on 20 October 1941, with Captain Marc A. Mitscher in command.

== Service history ==
Before the attack on Pearl Harbor, Hornet trained out of Norfolk. A hint of a future mission occurred on 2 February 1942, when Hornet departed Norfolk with two Army Air Forces North American B-25 Mitchell medium bombers on deck. Once at sea, the planes were launched to the surprise and amazement of Hornet's crew. Her men were unaware of the meaning of this experiment. Hornet returned to Norfolk, prepared to leave for combat, and sailed for the West Coast on 4 March via the Panama Canal.

Contemporary 1943 Navy film about the career of the USS Hornet

=== Doolittle Raid, April 1942 ===
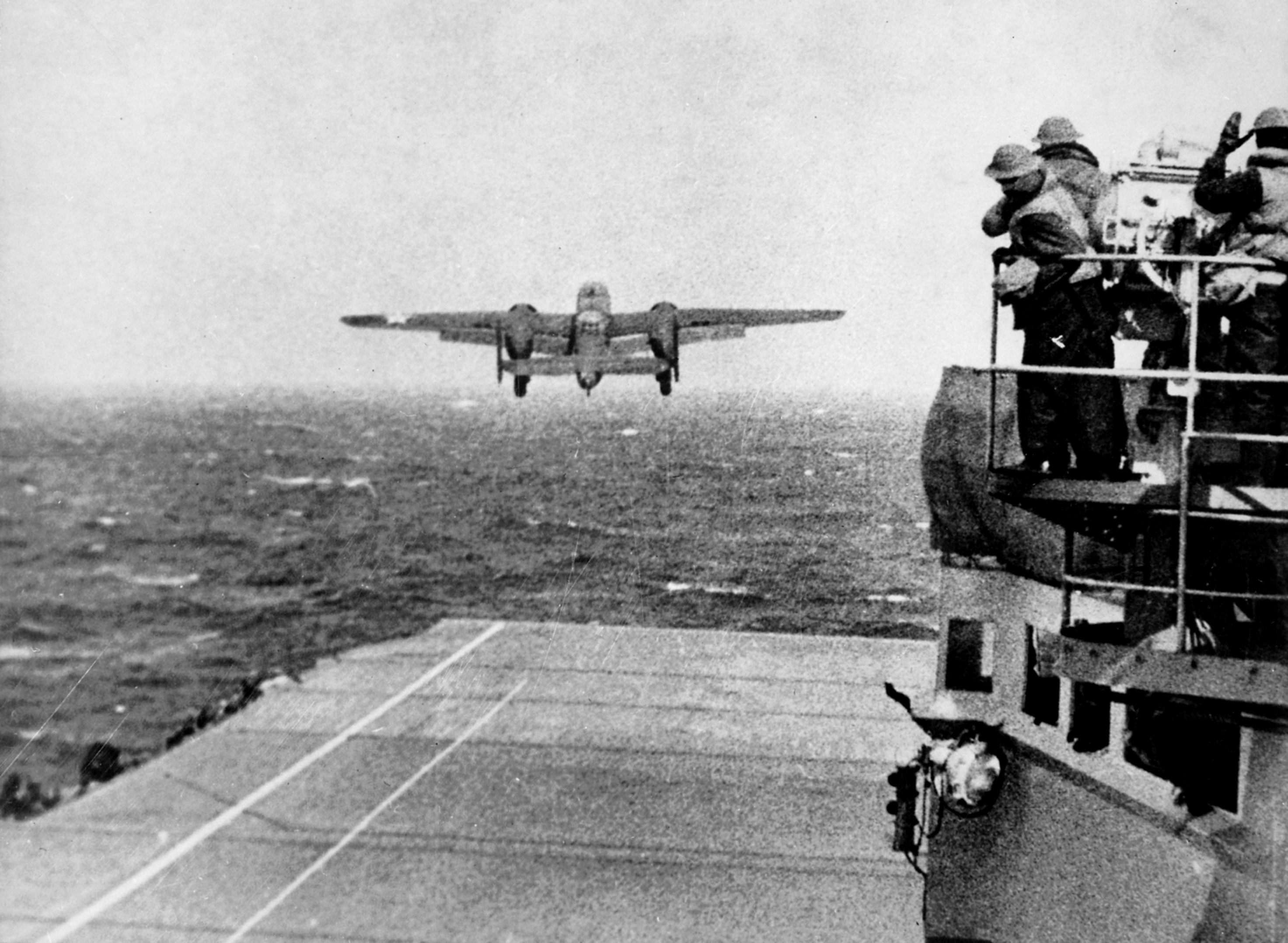
A B-25 taking off from Hornet

Hornet arrived at Naval Air Station Alameda, California, on 20 March 1942 with her own planes on the hangar deck. By midafternoon on 1 April, she loaded 16 B-25s on the flight deck, under the command of Lieutenant Colonel James H. Doolittle, 70 United States Army Air Corps officers, and 64 enlisted men reported aboard. In company of her escort, Hornet departed Alameda on 2 April under sealed orders. That afternoon, Captain Mitscher informed his men of their mission, a bombing raid on Japan.

Eleven days later, Hornet joined the aircraft carrier Enterprise at Midway, and Task Force 16 turned toward Japan. With Enterprise providing combat air patrol cover, Hornet was to steam deep into enemy waters. Originally, the task force intended to proceed to within 400 nmi (460 mi; 740 km) of the Japanese coast, but on the morning of 18 April, a Japanese patrol boat, No. 23 Nitto Maru, sighted the American task force. Nashville sank the patrol boat. Amid concerns that the Japanese had been made aware of their presence, Doolittle and his raiders launched prematurely from 600 nmi (690 mi; 1,100 km) out, instead of the planned 400 nmi (460 mi; 740 km). Because of this decision, none of the 16 planes made it to their designated landing strips in China. After the war, Tokyo was found to have received the Nitto Maru's message in a garbled form and the Japanese ship was sunk before it could get a clear message through to the Japanese mainland.

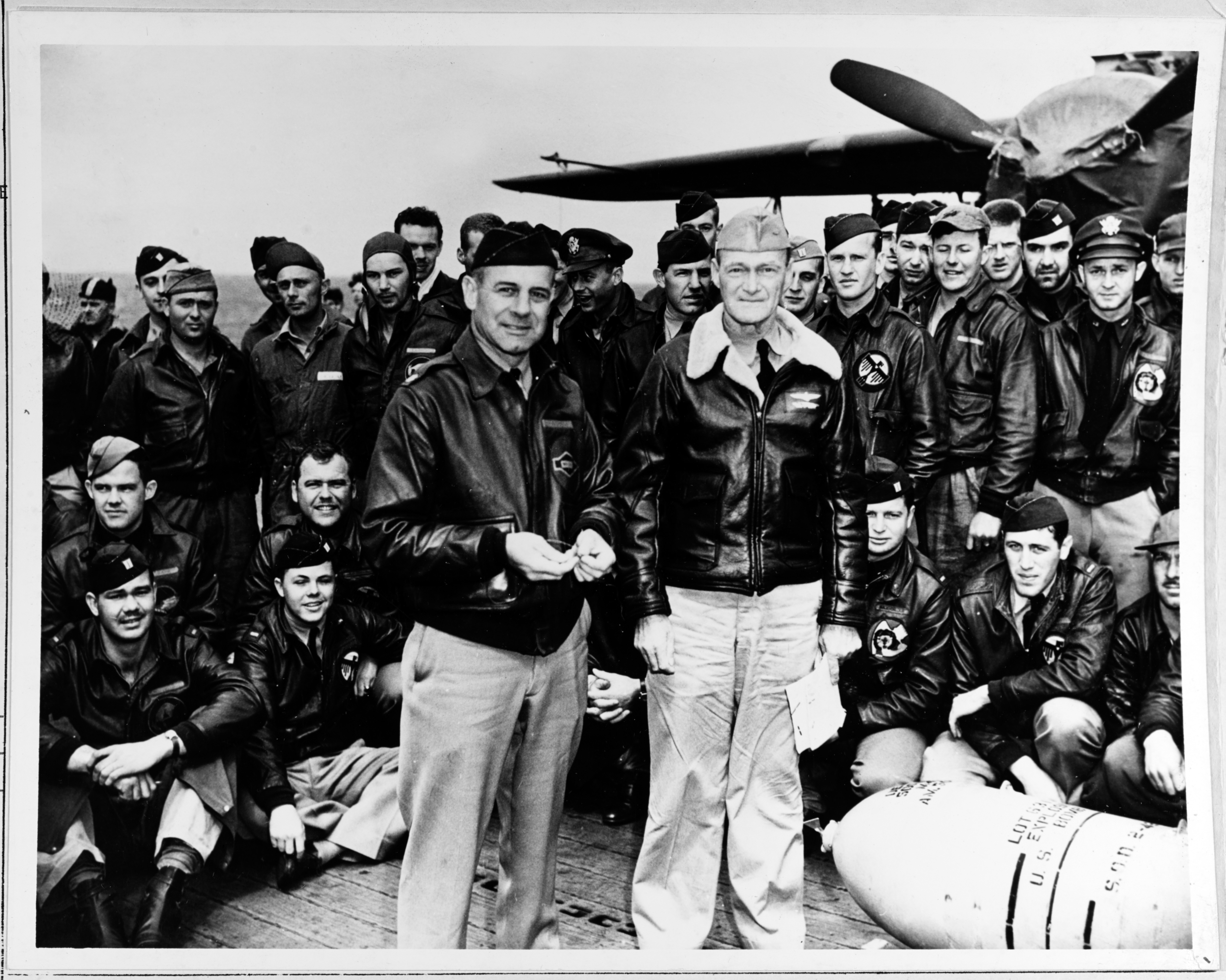
Lt. Colonel James Doolittle and Captain Marc Mitscher on board USS Hornet in April 1942

As Hornet came about and prepared to launch the bombers, which had been readied for take-off the previous day, a gale of more than 40 kn (46 mph; 74 km/h) churned the sea with 30 ft (9.1 m) crests. Heavy swells, which caused the ship to pitch violently, shipped sea and spray over the bow, wet the flight deck, and drenched the deck crews. The lead plane, commanded by Colonel Doolittle, had only 467 ft (142 m) of flight deck, while the last B-25 hung its twin rudders far out over the fantail. Doolittle, timing himself against the rise and fall of the ship's bow, lumbered down the flight deck, circled Hornet after take-off, and set course for Japan. By 09:20, all 16 were airborne, heading for the first American air strike against the Japanese home islands.

Hornet brought her own planes on deck, as Task Force 16 steamed at full speed for Pearl Harbor. Intercepted broadcasts, both in Japanese and English, confirmed at 14:46 the success of the raids. Exactly one week to the hour after launching the B-25s, Hornet sailed into Pearl Harbor. The Tokyo raid being the Hornet's mission was kept an official secret for a year. Until then, President Roosevelt referred to the ship from which the bombers were launched only as "Shangri-La." Two years later, the Navy gave this name to an aircraft carrier.

Hornet steamed from Pearl Harbor to aid Yorktown and Lexington on 30 April at the Battle of the Coral Sea, though the battle ended before she arrived. On 4 May, Task Force 16 crossed the equator, the first time ever for Hornet. Hornet, alongside Enterprise, executed a feint towards Nauru and Banaba (Ocean) Islands, which caused the Japanese to cancel their operation to seize the two islands. She returned to Hawaii on 26 May, and sailed again two days later to help repulse an expected Japanese assault on Midway.

=== Battle of Midway, June 1942 ===
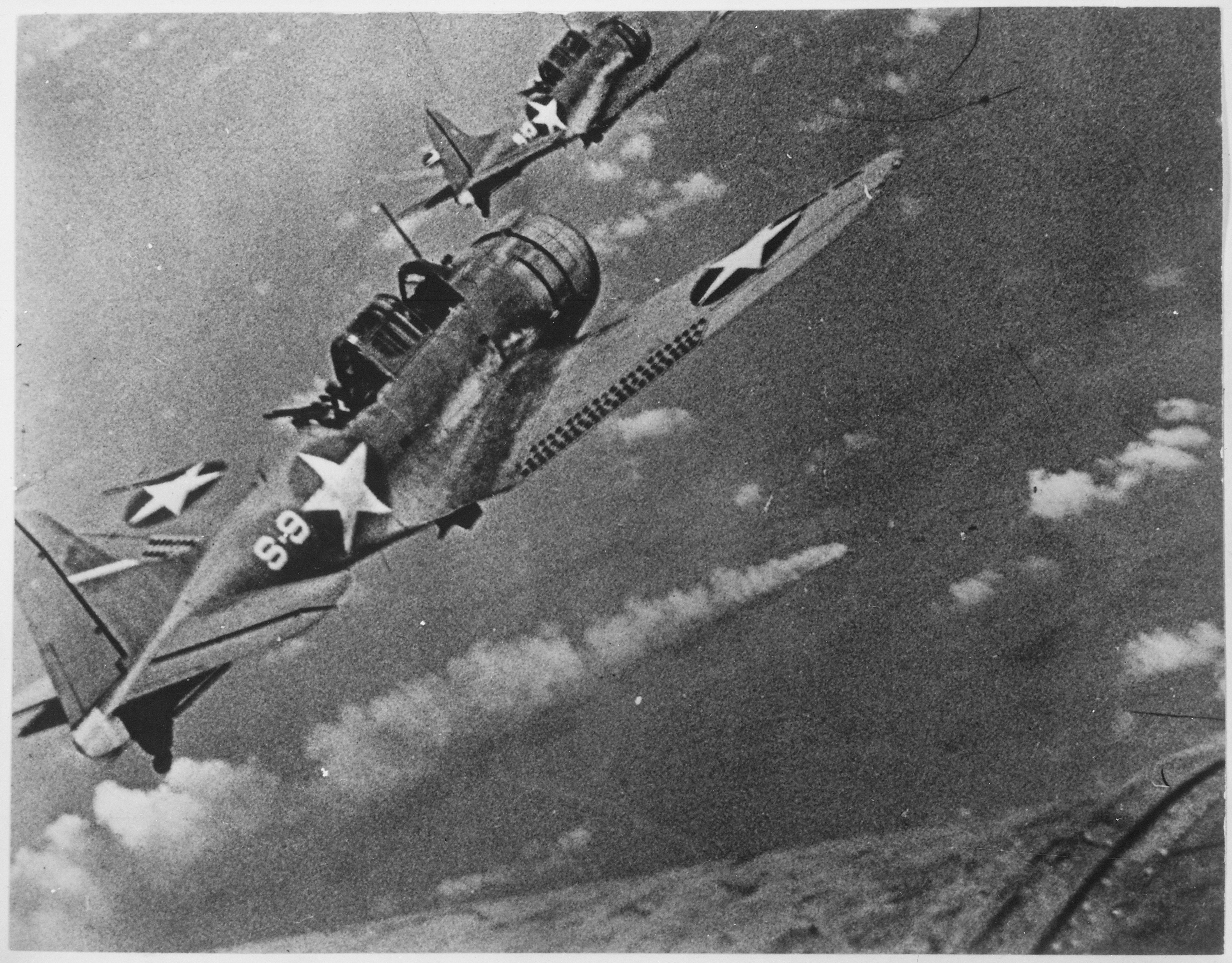
SBDs from Hornet at Midway

On 28 May 1942, Hornet and Task Force 16 steamed out of Pearl Harbor heading for Point "Luck", an arbitrary spot in the ocean roughly 325 mi (523 km) northeast of Midway, where they would be in a flank position to ambush Japan's mobile strike force of four frontline aircraft carriers, the Kidō Butai. Japanese carrier-based planes were reported headed for Midway in the early morning of 4 June. Hornet, Yorktown, and Enterprise launched aircraft, just as the Japanese carriers struck their planes below to prepare for a second attack on Midway. Hornet's dive bombers followed an incorrect heading and did not find the enemy fleet. Several bombers and all of the escorting fighters were forced to ditch when they ran out of fuel attempting to return to the ship; 15 torpedo bombers of Torpedo Squadron 8 (VT-8) found the Japanese ships and attacked. They were met by overwhelming fighter opposition about 8 nmi (9 mi) out, and with no escorts to protect them, they were shot down. Ensign George H. Gay, USNR, was the only survivor of 30 men.

Further attacks from Enterprise and Yorktown's torpedo bombers proved equally disastrous, but succeeded in forcing the Japanese carriers to keep their decks clear for combat air patrol operations, rather than launching a counterattack against the Americans. Japanese fighters were shooting down the last of the torpedo bombers over Hiryū when dive bombers of Enterprise and Yorktown attacked, causing enormous fires aboard the three other Japanese carriers, ultimately leading to their loss. Hiryū was hit late in the afternoon of 4 June by a strike from Enterprise and sank early the next morning. Hornet's aircraft, launching late due to the necessity of recovering Yorktown's scout planes and faulty communications, attacked a battleship and other escorts, but failed to score hits. Yorktown was lost to combined aerial and submarine attack.

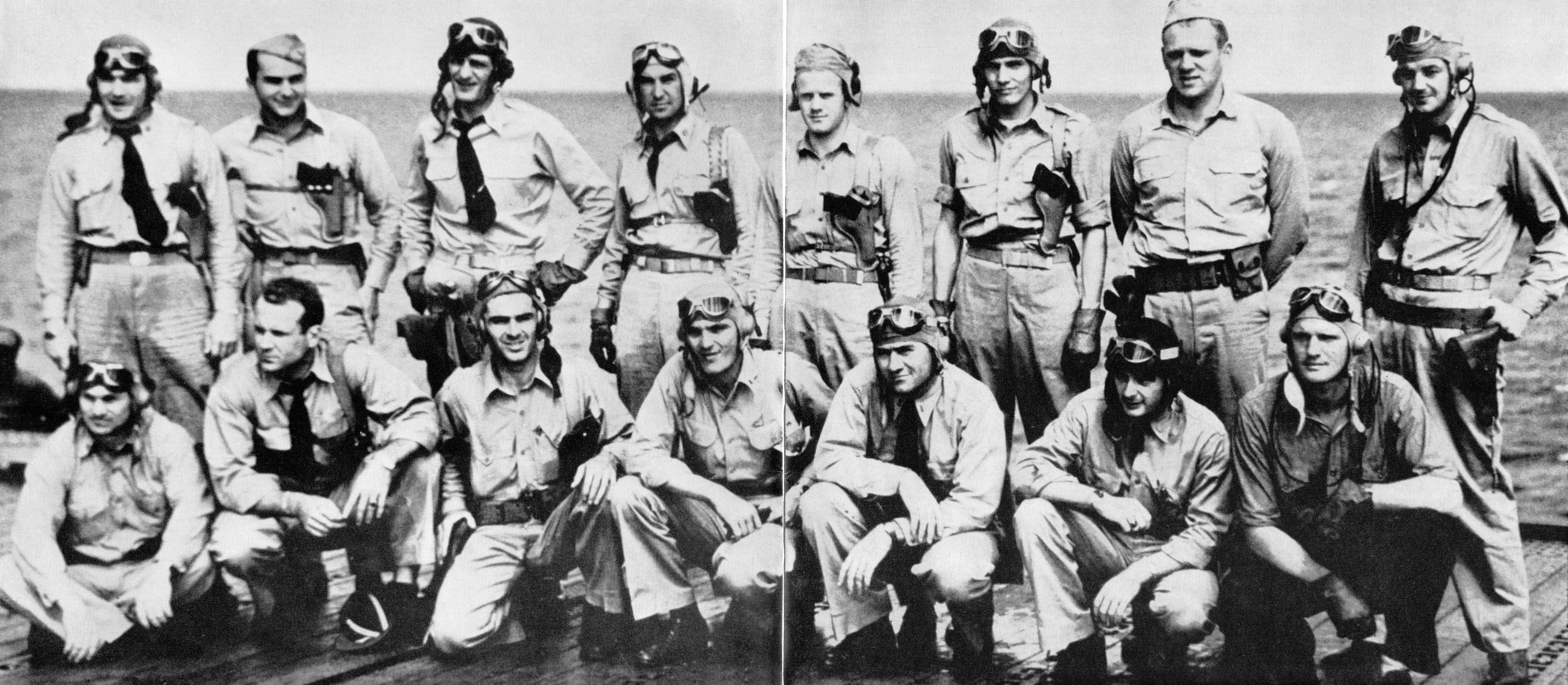
Lieutenant Commander John C. Waldron's Douglas TBD Devastator pilots on USS Hornet in May 1942

Hornet's aircraft attacked the fleeing Japanese fleet on 6 June and assisted in sinking the heavy cruiser Mikuma, damaging a destroyer, and leaving the heavy cruiser Mogami heavily damaged and on fire. The attack by Hornet on the Mogami ended one of the great decisive battles of naval history. Midway Atoll was saved as an important base for American operations into the Western Pacific Ocean. Of greatest importance was the crippling of the Japanese carrier strength, a severe blow from which the Imperial Japanese Navy never fully recovered. The four large carriers took with them to the bottom about 250 naval aircraft and a high percentage of the most highly trained and experienced Japanese aircraft maintenance personnel. The victory at Midway was a decisive turning point in the War in the Pacific.

On 16 June 1942, Captain Charles P. Mason became commanding officer of Hornet upon her return to Pearl Harbor. Hornet spent the next six weeks replenishing her stores, having minor repairs performed, and most importantly, having additional light AA guns and the new RCA CXAM air-search radar fitted. She did not sail in late July with the forces sent to recapture Guadalcanal, but instead remained at Pearl Harbor in case she were needed elsewhere.

=== Solomon Islands campaign, August–October, 1942 ===
Hornet steamed out of harbor on 17 August 1942 to guard sea approaches to the bitterly contested Guadalcanal in the Solomon Islands. Bomb damage to Enterprise on 24 August, torpedo damage to Saratoga on 31 August, and the sinking of Wasp on 15 September (while Hornet was cruising in a separate task force only a few miles away, two of her consorts, the battleship North Carolina and the destroyer O'Brien, took hits from torpedoes in the same salvo, with O'Brien later sinking) left Hornet as the only operational U.S. carrier in the South Pacific. On 5 October, she was sent westward to strike at a concentration of shipping that had accumulated near the southeastern tip of Bougainville in what became known as the Buna-Faisi-Tonolai Raid; this was the Navy's only strike on this target, but the Japanese would remain active there, and the U. S. Army Air Forces would soon embark on a long series of follow-up raids on this target. Hornet remained the sole carrier available for policing the waters near Guadalcanal until 24 October 1942, when she was joined by Enterprise just northwest of the New Hebrides Islands. Both carriers and their escorts steamed out to intercept a Japanese aircraft carrier/battleship/cruiser force closing in on Guadalcanal.

==== Battle of the Santa Cruz Islands ====
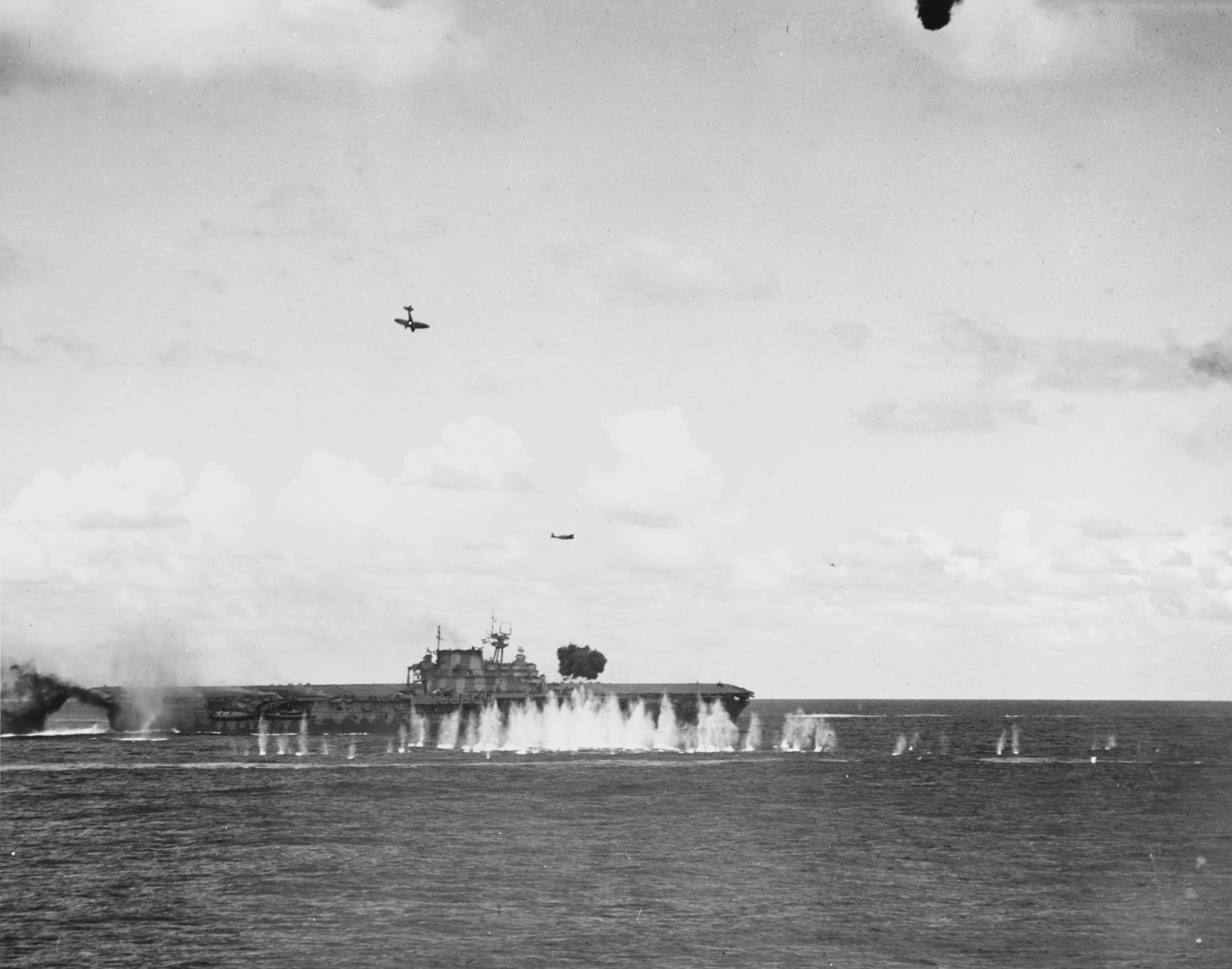
Hornet under attack during the Battle of the Santa Cruz Islands

The Battle of the Santa Cruz Islands took place on 26 October 1942 without contact between surface ships of the opposing forces. That morning, Enterprise's planes bombed the carrier Zuihō, while planes from Hornet severely damaged the carrier Shōkaku and the heavy cruiser Chikuma. Two other cruisers were also attacked by Hornet's aircraft. Meanwhile, Hornet was attacked by a coordinated dive bomber and torpedo plane attack. In a 15-minute period, Hornet was hit by three bombs from Aichi D3A "Val" dive bombers. One Val, after being heavily damaged by AA fire while approaching Hornet, crashed into the carrier's island, killing seven men and spreading burning avgas over the deck. A flight of Nakajima B5N "Kate" torpedo bombers attacked Hornet and scored two hits, which seriously damaged the electrical systems and engines. As the carrier came to a halt, another damaged Val deliberately crashed into Hornet's port side near the bow.

With power knocked out to her engines, Hornet was unable to launch or land aircraft, forcing her aviators to either land on Enterprise or ditch in the ocean. Rear Admiral George D. Murray ordered the heavy cruiser Northampton to tow Hornet clear of the action. Japanese aircraft were attacking Enterprise, allowing Northampton to tow Hornet at a speed of about 5 kn (9 km/h; 6 mph). Repair crews were on the verge of restoring power when another flight of nine Kate torpedo planes attacked. Eight of these aircraft were either shot down or failed to score hits, but the ninth scored a fatal hit on the starboard side. The torpedo hit destroyed the repairs to the electrical system and caused a 14° list. After being informed that Japanese surface forces were approaching and that further towing efforts were futile, Vice Admiral William Halsey ordered Hornet sunk, and an order of "abandon ship" was issued. Captain Mason, the last man on board, climbed over the side, and the survivors were soon picked up by the escorting destroyers.

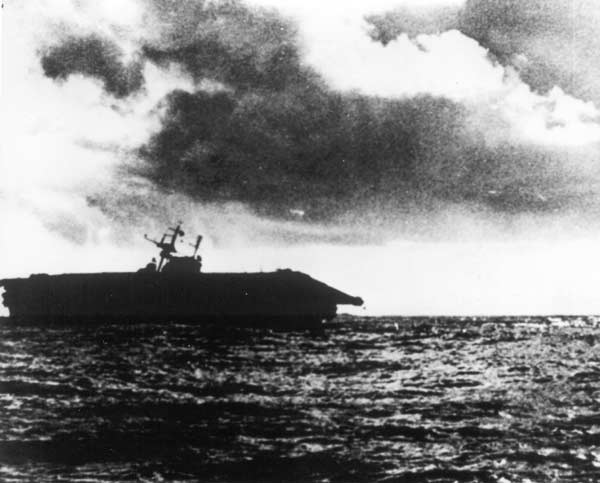
Hornet, sinking and abandoned

American warships attempted to scuttle the stricken carrier, which absorbed nine torpedoes, most of which failed to explode, and 430 5 in (127 mm) rounds from the destroyers Mustin and Anderson. The destroyers steamed away when a Japanese surface force entered the area. The Japanese destroyers Makigumo and Akigumo finally finished off Hornet with four 24-inch (610 mm) Long Lance torpedoes. At 01:35 on 27 October, Hornet finally capsized to starboard and sank, stern first, with the loss of 140 of her 2,200 sailors; 21 aircraft went down with the ship.

== Legacy ==
Hornet was stricken from the Naval Vessel Register on 13 January 1943. Her name was revived less than a year later when the newly constructed Essex-class aircraft carrier Kearsarge was commissioned as USS Hornet (CV-12). CV-8 is honored aboard her namesake, which is now the USS Hornet Museum docked in Alameda, California.

Hornet was the last American fleet carrier (CV) ever sunk by enemy fire, though the light carrier Princeton and a number of much smaller escort carriers were sunk in combat in other battles following Hornet's sinking.

=== Wreck discovery ===
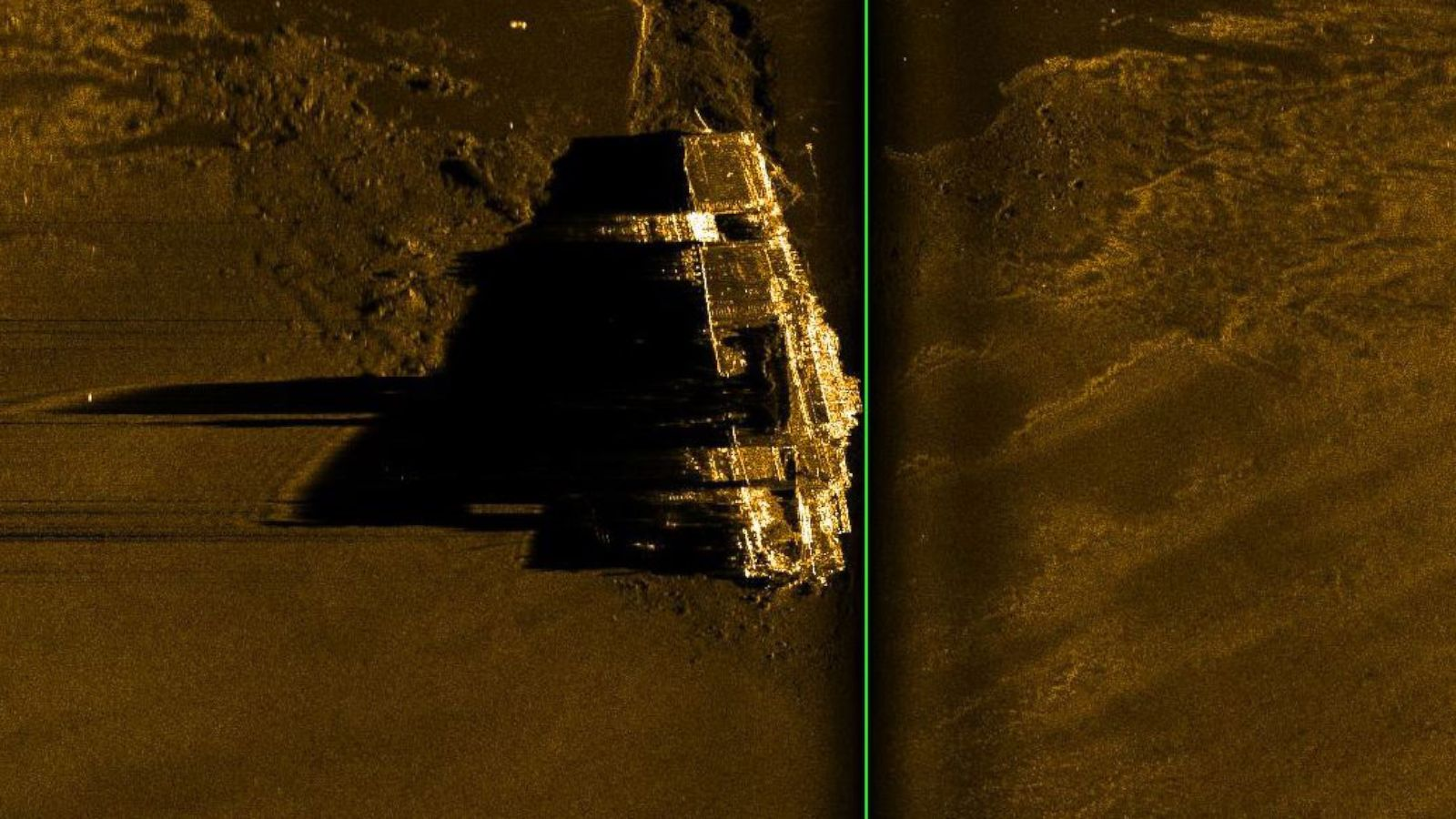
Sonar imagery of CV-8 on the sea floor

In late January 2019, the research vessel Petrel located Hornet's wreck at more than 17,500 feet (5,300 m) deep off the Solomon Islands. The expedition team, largely funded by Paul Allen, aboard the Petrel, used information from the archives of nine other U.S. warships that saw the carrier shortly before she was sunk. One of two robotic vehicles aboard the Petrel found the Hornet during its first dive mission. The carrier lies upright on the ocean floor, with her signal bridge and a section of her stern that broke away coming to rest around her.

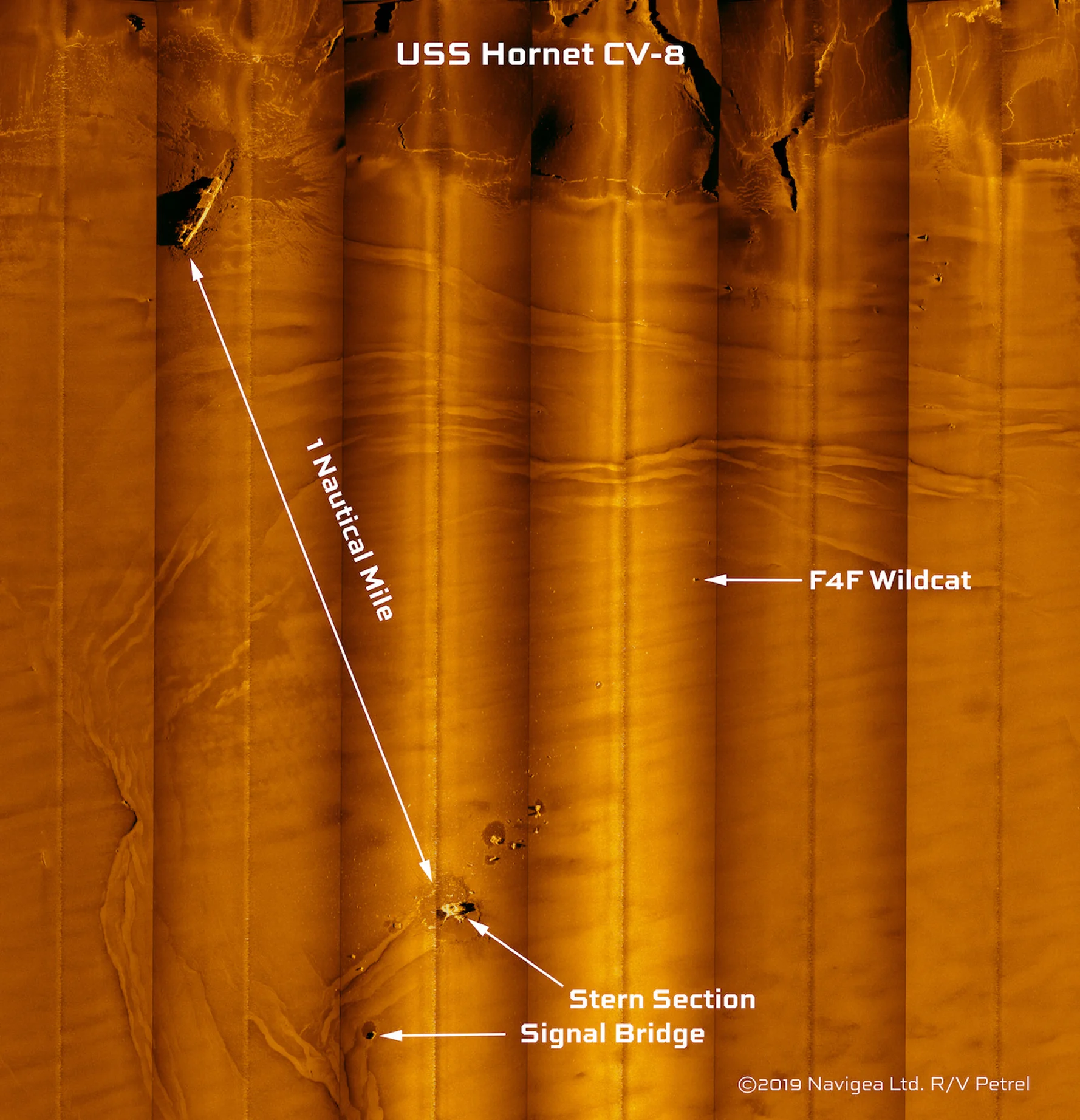
Sonar imagery of remains from CV-8 on the sea floor

== Awards ==

American Defense Service Medal with "Fleet" clasp
American Campaign Medal	Asiatic-Pacific Campaign Medal with four stars	World War II Victory Medal

Hornet was awarded four battle stars during World War II.

Service stars awarded
Action No.	Operation:Action	Operation Period	Period of CV-8 Participation	Battle Stars Awarded	Notes
(1)	The Battle of Midway	3–6 June 1942	3 June 1942 – 6 June 1942	1	A Presidential Unit Citation was awarded for this battle to Torpedo Squadron 8 flying from USS Hornet CV-8.
(2)	The Buin-Faisi-Tonolai raid	5 October 1942	5 October 1942	1	
(3)	The capture and defense of Guadalcanal	10 August 1942 – 8 February 1943	16 October 1942	1	
(4)	The Battle of the Santa Cruz Islands	26 October 1942	26 October 1942	1	USS Hornet CV-8 was sunk during this battle after being in service for a year and six days.
			Total Battle Stars	4	

In addition, Torpedo Squadron 8 flying from Hornet was awarded the Presidential Unit Citation. "for extraordinary heroism and distinguished service beyond the call of duty" during the Battle of Midway.
