= Locust Valley High School =

Locust Valley Middle/High School
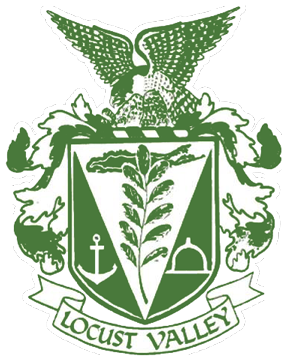

Location
- 99 Horse Hollow Road; Lattingtown, (Nassau County), New York 11560; United States
- Coordinates: 40.8879°N 73.5920°W

Information
- School type: Public school (government funded), high school
- School district: Locust Valley Central School District
- NCES District ID: 3617700
- CEEB code: 332882
- NCES School ID: 361770001592
- Teaching staff: 71.70 FTEs
- Grades: 9–12
- Gender: Coeducational
- Enrollment: 613 (as of 2023-2024)
- Student to teacher ratio: 8.55
- Campus: Suburb: Large
- Colors: Green, Black and White
- Mascot: Falcon
- Team name: Locust Valley Falcons

Locust Valley High School is a public high school located in Lattingtown, Nassau County, New York, U.S.A., and is the only high school operated by the Locust Valley Central School District.

The school's colors are Hunter (Dartmouth) Green and White. The school crest includes a falcon, and the athletic teams are known as The Falcons.

As of the 2022–23 school year, the school had an enrollment of 630 students and 88 classroom teachers, for a student–teacher ratio of 7.16:1. There were 134 students (21% of enrollment) eligible for free lunch and 3 (0% of students) eligible for reduced-cost lunch.
