= Mike Mohring (American football) =

American football player (born 1974)

No. 94, 98
- Position: Defensive tackle

Personal information
- Born: March 22, 1974 (age 52); Glen Cove, New York, U.S.
- Listed height: 6 ft 5 in (1.96 m)
- Listed weight: 295 lb (134 kg)

Career information
- High school: West Chester East (West Chester, Pennsylvania)
- College: Pittsburgh
- NFL draft: 1997: undrafted

Career history
- Miami Dolphins (1997)*; San Diego Chargers (1997–2001); Oakland Raiders (2002)*
- * Offseason or practice squad member only

Career NFL statistics
- Tackles: 38
- Sacks: 3
- Passes defended: 1
- Stats at Pro Football Reference

Michael Joseph Mohring (born March 22, 1974) is an American former professional football player who was a defensive tackle in the National Football League. He played five seasons for the San Diego Chargers (1997–2001). Mohring played in high school at West Chester East High School and played college football for the Pittsburgh Panthers.
