= Bob Kappes =

American football player and coach (1928–2020)

Biographical details
- Born: October 29, 1928; Cincinnati, Ohio, U.S
- Died: November 26, 2020 (aged 92); Athens, Ohio, U.S

Playing career
- 1946–1949: Miami (OH)
- Position: Center

Coaching career (HC unless noted)
- 1950–1957: Western Hills HS (OH)
- 1958–1977: Ohio (assistant)
- 1978: Ohio (interim HC)
- 1979–1984: Ohio (assistant)
- 1985–1993: Ohio (RC)

Head coaching record
- Overall: 3–8 (college)

Robert G. "Kap" Kappes (October 29, 1928 – November 26, 2020) was an American football player and coach. He served as the interim head football coach at Ohio University for one season, in 1978, compiling a record of 3–8. Kappes played college football at Miami University in Oxford, Ohio under head coaches Woody Hayes and Sid Gillman. After graduating from Miami in 1950, Kappes became the head football coach that fall at Western Hills High School in Cincinnati, Ohio. He remained there until 1958, when he was hired as an assistant football coach at Ohio University. Kappes is the father of Stephen Kappes, the former Deputy Director of the Central Intelligence Agency.

Kappes was born on October 29, 1928, in Cincinnati. He died on November 26, 2020, in Athens, Ohio.

== Head coaching record ==
=== College ===
| Year | Team | Overall | Conference | Standing | Bowl/playoffs |
|---|---|---|---|---|---|
Ohio Bobcats (Mid-American Conference) (1978)
| 1978 | Ohio | 3–8 | 3–5 | T–5th | |
| Ohio: | | 3–8 | 3–5 | | |
| Total: | | 3–8 | | | |
