= 1978 Yale Bulldogs football team =

American college football season

1978 Yale Bulldogs football
- Conference: Ivy League
- Record: 5–2–2 (4–1–2 Ivy)
- Head coach: Carmen Cozza (14th season)
- Home stadium: Yale Bowl

1978 Ivy League football standings
	Conf.					Overall
Team	W		L		T	W		L		T
Dartmouth $	6	–	1	–	0	6	–	3	–	0
Brown	5	–	2	–	0	6	–	3	–	0
Yale	4	–	1	–	2	5	–	2	–	2
Cornell	3	–	3	–	1	5	–	3	–	1
Harvard	2	–	4	–	1	4	–	4	–	1
Columbia	2	–	4	–	1	3	–	5	–	1
Princeton	1	–	4	–	2	2	–	5	–	2
Penn	1	–	5	–	1	2	–	6	–	1
$ – Conference champion

The 1978 Yale Bulldogs football team represented Yale University in the 1978 NCAA Division I-A football season. The Bulldogs were led by 14th-year head coach Carmen Cozza, played their home games at the Yale Bowl and finished in third place in the Ivy League with a 4–1–2 record, 5–2–2 overall.

== Schedule ==
Date	Opponent	Site	Result	Attendance	Source
September 23	at Brown	Brown Stadium; Providence, RI	W 21–0	15,812	
September 30	Connecticut*	Yale Bowl; New Haven, CT	W 21–7	23,431	
October 7	Rutgers*	Yale Bowl; New Haven, CT	L 27–28	21,000	
October 14	at Dartmouth	Memorial Field; Hanover, NH	L 3–10	17,500	
October 21	Columbia	Yale Bowl; New Haven, CT	T 3–3	19,000	
October 28	at Penn	Franklin Field; Philadelphia, PA	T 17–17	15,980	
November 4	Cornell	Yale Bowl; New Haven, CT	W 42–14	23,000	
November 6	Princeton	Yale Bowl; New Haven, CT (rivalry)	W 23–7	32,000	
November 13	at Harvard	Harvard Stadium; Boston, MA (rivalry)	W 35–28	41,500	
*Non-conference game

== Roster ==
1978 Yale Bulldogs football team roster
Players
Coaches
Offense

Pos.	#	Name	Class
FB	38	Rick Angelone	Sr
QB	13	Blake Bennett	Jr
QB	18	Steve Betz	Jr
OT	57	A. J. DeCusati	Sr
QB	6	Dennis Dunn	Jr
RB	22	John Hatem	Sr
RB	42	Kenny Hill	Jr
OT	79	Pete McNamara	Sr
RB	41	John Nitti	So
G	64	Mark Noetzel	Sr
QB	14	Pat O'Brien	Sr
OT	70	Dan Skarzynski	So
WR	85	John Spagnola	Sr
G	76	Tim Spears	Jr
WR	87	Dan Stratton	So
G	58	Bill Whitehurst	So
OT	73	Chuck Zorio	Sr

Defense

Pos.	#	Name	Class
DT	71	David Conrad	Jr
LB	91	Bill Crowley	Sr
DE	86	Tim Dwyer	Jr
DE	36	Rich Faschan	Sr
DT	97	John Ford	So
DE	67	Dan Goodfriend	Sr
DB	23	Chip Kelly	Jr
DE	99	John Kelly	So
LB	37	Scott McKenzie	So
S	8	Mike Muscatello	So
DB	11	Kurt Nondorf	Sr
DB	25	Arnie Pinkston	Jr
DE	89	Clint Streit	Sr
LB	90	Tim Tumpane	Jr
DE	92	Pete White	Jr
LB	48	Joe Zuraw	Sr

Special teams

Pos.	#	Name	Class
K	2	David Schwartz	Jr

Head coach

- Carmen Cozza

Coordinators/assistant coaches

Legend

- (C) Team captain
- (S) Suspended
- (I) Ineligible
- Injured
- Redshirt

== NFL draft ==
The following Bulldog was selected in the National Football League draft following the season.

Round	Pick	Player	Position	NFL team
9	245	John Spagnola	TE	New England Patriots
