= 1978 McNeese State Cowboys football team =

American college football season

1978 McNeese State Cowboys football
- Conference: Southland Conference
- Record: 7–4 (2–3 Southland)
- Head coach: Jack Doland (9th season)
- Home stadium: Cowboy Stadium

1978 Southland Conference football standings
	Conf.					Overall
Team	W		L		T	W		L		T
Louisiana Tech +	4	–	1	–	0	6	–	5	–	0
Arkansas State +	4	–	1	–	0	7	–	4	–	0
UT Arlington	3	–	2	–	0	5	–	6	–	0
McNeese State	2	–	3	–	0	7	–	4	–	0
Southwestern Louisiana	2	–	3	–	0	3	–	8	–	0
Lamar	0	–	5	–	0	2	–	8	–	1
+ – Conference co-champions

The 1978 McNeese State Cowboys football team was an American football team that represented McNeese State University as a member of the Southland Conference (Southland) during the 1978 NCAA Division I-A football season. In their ninth year under head coach Jack Doland, the team compiled an overall record of 7–4, with a mark of 2–3 in conference play and finished tied for fourth in the Southland.

== Schedule ==
Date	Opponent	Site	Result	Attendance	Source
September 9	Fresno State*	Cowboy Stadium; Lake Charles, LA	W 21–16	14,125	
September 16	at West Texas State*	Kimbrough Memorial Stadium; Canyon, TX	W 45–13		
September 23	at Northwestern State*	Harry Turpin Stadium; Natchitoches, LA (rivalry)	L 7–10		
September 30	at Louisiana Tech	Joe Aillet Stadium; Ruston, LA	L 20–34	18,200	
October 7	Nicholls State*	Cowboy Stadium; Lake Charles, LA	W 35–10	18,000	
October 14	Northeast Louisiana*	Cowboy Stadium; Lake Charles, LA	W 31–10		
October 21	at Arkansas State	Indian Stadium; Jonesboro, AR	L 3–6		
October 28	Chattanooga*	Cowboy Stadium; Lake Charles, LA	W 28–24		
November 11	at Lamar	Cardinal Stadium; Beaumont, TX (rivalry)	W 24–23		
November 18	UT Arlington	Cowboy Stadium; Lake Charles, LA	L 17–20	13,800	
November 25	Southwestern Louisiana	Cowboy Stadium; Lake Charles, LA (rivalry)	W 44–18		
*Non-conference game
