= 1978 UT Arlington Mavericks football team =

American college football season

1978 UT Arlington Mavericks football
- Conference: Southland Conference
- Record: 5–6 (3–2 Southland)
- Head coach: Harold Elliott (5th season)
- Home stadium: Cravens Field

1978 Southland Conference football standings
	Conf.					Overall
Team	W		L		T	W		L		T
Louisiana Tech +	4	–	1	–	0	6	–	5	–	0
Arkansas State +	4	–	1	–	0	7	–	4	–	0
UT Arlington	3	–	2	–	0	5	–	6	–	0
McNeese State	2	–	3	–	0	7	–	4	–	0
Southwestern Louisiana	2	–	3	–	0	3	–	8	–	0
Lamar	0	–	5	–	0	2	–	8	–	1
+ – Conference co-champions

The 1978 UT Arlington Mavericks football team was an American football team that represented the University of Texas at Arlington in the Southland Conference during the 1978 NCAA Division I-A football season. In their fifth year under head coach Harold Elliott, the team compiled a 5–6 record.

== Schedule ==
Date	Opponent	Site	Result	Attendance	Source
September 2	at Drake*	Drake Stadium; Des Moines, IA	L 23–25	8,580	
September 9	West Texas State*	Cravens Field; Arlington, TX	L 10–18	6,750	
September 16	vs. North Texas State*	Texas Stadium; Irving, TX	L 23–28	16,821	
September 23	Louisiana Tech	Cravens Field; Arlington, TX	L 21–28	7,025	
September 30	at East Carolina*	Ficklen Stadium; Greenville, NC	L 23–17	25,986	
October 7	at New Mexico State*	Aggie Memorial Stadium; Las Cruces, NM	W 28–17	13,852	
October 14	Southwestern Louisiana	Cravens Field; Arlington, TX	W 24–3	5,450	
October 21	at Lamar	Cardinal Stadium; Beaumont, TX	W 37–17	4,200	
October 28	Arkansas State	Cravens Field; Arlington, TX	L 7–27	7,805	
November 4	Northwestern State*	Cravens Field; Arlington, TX	W 30–7	5,551	
November 18	at McNeese State	Cowboy Stadium; Lake Charles, LA	W 20–17	13,800	
*Non-conference game
