= 1978 Kent State Golden Flashes football team =

American college football season

1978 Kent State Golden Flashes football
- Conference: Mid-American Conference
- Record: 4–7 (2–6 MAC)
- Head coach: Ron Blackledge (1st season)
- Home stadium: Dix Stadium

1978 Mid-American Conference football standings
	Conf.					Overall
Team	W		L		T	W		L		T
Ball State $	8	–	0	–	0	10	–	1	–	0
Central Michigan	8	–	1	–	0	9	–	2	–	0
Miami (OH)	5	–	2	–	0	8	–	2	–	1
Western Michigan	5	–	4	–	0	7	–	4	–	0
Bowling Green	3	–	5	–	0	4	–	7	–	0
Ohio	3	–	5	–	0	3	–	8	–	0
Northern Illinois	2	–	4	–	0	5	–	6	–	0
Kent State	2	–	6	–	0	4	–	7	–	0
Toledo	2	–	7	–	0	2	–	9	–	0
Eastern Michigan	1	–	5	–	0	3	–	7	–	0
$ – Conference champion

The 1978 Kent State Golden Flashes football team was an American football team that represented Kent State University in the Mid-American Conference (MAC) during the 1978 NCAA Division I-A football season. In their first season under head coach Ron Blackledge, the Golden Flashes compiled a 4–7 record (2–6 against MAC opponents), finished in eighth place in the MAC, and were outscored by all opponents by a combined total of 248 to 158.

The team's statistical leaders included Tom Delaney with 440 rushing yards, Tom Delaney with 400 passing yards, and Mike Moore with 250 receiving yards. Three Kent State players were selected as first-team All-MAC players: linebacker Jack Lazor and defensive linemen Mike McKibben and Mike Zele.

== Schedule ==
Date	Opponent	Site	Result	Attendance	Source
September 9	at Central Michigan	Perry Shorts Stadium; Mount Pleasant, MI	L 0–41		
September 16	at Ball State	Ball State Stadium; Muncie, IN	L 3–27	15,225	
September 23	Illinois State*	Dix Stadium; Kent, OH	W 34–3	4,108	
September 30	Ohio	Dix Stadium; Kent, OH	W 20–14		
October 7	Western Michigan	Dix Stadium; Kent, OH	L 0–14		
October 14	at Bowling Green	Doyt Perry Stadium; Bowling Green, OH (rivalry)	L 20–28		
October 21	Marshall*	Dix Stadium; Kent, OH	W 20–17	5,418	
October 28	at Air Force*	Falcon Stadium; Colorado Springs, CO	L 10–26	20,769	
November 4	at Northern Illinois	Huskie Stadium; DeKalb, IL	L 21–27		
November 11	at Miami (OH)	Miami Field; Oxford, OH	L 13–38	18,428	
November 18	Toledo	Dix Stadium; Kent, OH	W 17–13	4,847	
*Non-conference game
