= 1978 Penn Quakers football team =

American college football season

1978 Penn Quakers football
- Conference: Ivy League
- Record: 2–6–1 (1–5–1 Ivy)
- Head coach: Harry Gamble (8th season)
- Defensive coordinator: Otto Kneidinger (8th season)
- Captains: Boris Radisic; Tom Roland
- Home stadium: Franklin Field

1978 Ivy League football standings
	Conf.					Overall
Team	W		L		T	W		L		T
Dartmouth $	6	–	1	–	0	6	–	3	–	0
Brown	5	–	2	–	0	6	–	3	–	0
Yale	4	–	1	–	2	5	–	2	–	2
Cornell	3	–	3	–	1	5	–	3	–	1
Harvard	2	–	4	–	1	4	–	4	–	1
Columbia	2	–	4	–	1	3	–	5	–	1
Princeton	1	–	4	–	2	2	–	5	–	2
Penn	1	–	5	–	1	2	–	6	–	1
$ – Conference champion

The 1978 Penn Quakers football team was an American football team that represented the University of Pennsylvania during the 1978 NCAA Division I-A football season. Penn finished last in the Ivy League.

The team played its home games at Franklin Field adjacent to the university's campus in Philadelphia, Pennsylvania.

== History ==
In its eighth year under head coach Harry Gamble, the team compiled a 2–6–1 record and was outscored 187 to 139. Tom Roland and Boris Radisic were the team captains.

Penn's 1–5–1 conference was the worst in the Ivy League standings. The Quakers were outscored 154 to 99 by Ivy opponents.

== Schedule ==
Date	Opponent	Site	Result	Attendance	Source
September 23	at Dartmouth	Memorial Field; Hanover, NH	L 21–31	10,100	
September 29	Lehigh*	Franklin Field; Philadelphia, PA	W 21–13	14,158	
October 7	Columbia	Franklin Field; Philadelphia, PA	W 31–19	11,627	
October 14	at Brown	Brown Stadium; Providence, RI	L 0–14	2,600	
October 21	at Lafayette*	Fisher Field; Easton, PA	L 19–20	11,200	
October 28	Yale	Franklin Field; Philadelphia, PA	T 17–17	15,980	
November 4	at Princeton	Palmer Stadium; Princeton, NJ (rivalry)	L 0–21	10,354	
November 11	Harvard	Franklin Field; Philadelphia, PA (rivalry)	L 13–17	18,475	
November 18	at Cornell	Schoellkopf Field; Ithaca, NY (rivalry)	L 17–35	7,000	
*Non-conference game
