= 1978 Cornell Big Red football team =

American college football season

1978 Cornell Big Red football
- Conference: Ivy League
- Record: 5–3–1 (3–3–1 Ivy)
- Head coach: Bob Blackman (2nd season)
- Captains: Mike Donahue; Dave Kintigh
- Home stadium: Schoellkopf Field

1978 Ivy League football standings
	Conf.					Overall
Team	W		L		T	W		L		T
Dartmouth $	6	–	1	–	0	6	–	3	–	0
Brown	5	–	2	–	0	6	–	3	–	0
Yale	4	–	1	–	2	5	–	2	–	2
Cornell	3	–	3	–	1	5	–	3	–	1
Harvard	2	–	4	–	1	4	–	4	–	1
Columbia	2	–	4	–	1	3	–	5	–	1
Princeton	1	–	4	–	2	2	–	5	–	2
Penn	1	–	5	–	1	2	–	6	–	1
$ – Conference champion

The 1978 Cornell Big Red football team was an American football team that represented Cornell University during the 1978 NCAA Division I-A football season. Cornell finished in fourth place in the Ivy League.

In its second season under head coach Bob Blackman, the team compiled a 5–3–1 record and outscored opponents 188 to 154. Team captains were Mike Donahue and Dave Kintigh.

Cornell's 3–3–1 conference record placed fourth in the Ivy League standings. The Big Red outscored Ivy opponents 143 to 142.

Cornell played its home games at Schoellkopf Field in Ithaca, New York.

== Schedule ==
Date	Opponent	Site	Result	Attendance	Source
September 23	Princeton	Schoellkopf Field; Ithaca, NY	T 14–14	15,000	
September 30	at Colgate*	Andy Kerr Stadium; Hamilton, NY (rivalry)	W 21–12	8,500	
October 7	Bucknell*	Schoellkopf Field; Ithaca, NY	W 24–0	12,500	
October 14	at Harvard	Harvard Stadium; Boston, MA	W 25–20	6,000	
October 21	Brown	Schoellkopf Field; Ithaca, NY	L 13–21	10,524	
October 28	Dartmouth	Schoellkopf Field; Ithaca, NY (rivalry)	L 7–14	15,063	
November 4	at Yale	Yale Bowl; New Haven, CT	L 14–42	23,000	
November 11	at Columbia	Baker Field; New York, NY (rivalry)	W 35–14	7,105	
November 18	Penn	Schoellkopf Field; Ithaca, NY (rivalry)	W 35–17	7,000	
*Non-conference game
