= 1978 Miami Redskins football team =

American football team

1978 Miami Redskins football
- Conference: Mid-American Conference
- Record: 8–2–1 (5–2 MAC)
- Head coach: Tom Reed (1st season)
- Defensive coordinator: Tim Rose (1st season)
- Home stadium: Miami Field

1978 Mid-American Conference football standings
	Conf.					Overall
Team	W		L		T	W		L		T
Ball State $	8	–	0	–	0	10	–	1	–	0
Central Michigan	8	–	1	–	0	9	–	2	–	0
Miami (OH)	5	–	2	–	0	8	–	2	–	1
Western Michigan	5	–	4	–	0	7	–	4	–	0
Bowling Green	3	–	5	–	0	4	–	7	–	0
Ohio	3	–	5	–	0	3	–	8	–	0
Northern Illinois	2	–	4	–	0	5	–	6	–	0
Kent State	2	–	6	–	0	4	–	7	–	0
Toledo	2	–	7	–	0	2	–	9	–	0
Eastern Michigan	1	–	5	–	0	3	–	7	–	0
$ – Conference champion

The 1978 Miami Redskins football team was an American football team that represented Miami University in the Mid-American Conference (MAC) during the 1978 NCAA Division I-A football season. In its first season under head coach Tom Reed, the team compiled an 8–2–1 record (5–2 against MAC opponents), finished in third place in the MAC, and outscored all opponents by a combined total of 228 to 161.

The team's statistical leaders included Larry Fortner with 976 passing yards, Mark Hunter with 1,046 rushing yards, and Paul Warth with 299 receiving yards.

== Schedule ==
Date	Opponent	Site	Result	Attendance	Source
September 9	at Ball State	Ball State Stadium; Muncie, IN	L 14–38	17,875	
September 18	Central Michigan	Miami Field; Oxford, OH	L 18–37	10,170	
September 23	Western Michigan	Miami Field; Oxford, OH	W 7–3	10,033	
September 30	at Dayton*	Welcome Stadium; Dayton, OH	T 10–10	11,423	
October 7	at North Carolina*	Kenan Memorial Stadium; Chapel Hill, NC	W 7–3	48,000	
October 14	at Marshall*	Fairfield Stadium; Huntington, WV	W 29–3	12,221	
October 21	Bowling Green	Miami Field; Oxford, OH	W 18–7	18,251	
October 28	at Toledo	Glass Bowl; Toledo, OH	W 28–7		
November 4	at Ohio	Peden Stadium; Athens, OH (rivalry)	W 31–16	15,023	
November 11	Kent State	Miami Field; Oxford, OH	W 38–13	18,428	
November 18	Cincinnati*	Miami Field; Oxford, OH (rivalry)	W 28–24		
*Non-conference game
