= 1978 Pacific Tigers football team =

American college football season

1978 Pacific Tigers football
- Conference: Pacific Coast Athletic Association
- Record: 4–8 (3–2 PCAA)
- Head coach: Chester Caddas (7th season)
- Home stadium: Pacific Memorial Stadium

1978 Pacific Coast Athletic Association football standings
	Conf.					Overall
Team	W		L		T	W		L		T
Utah State +	4	–	1	–	0	7	–	4	–	0
San Jose State +	4	–	1	–	0	7	–	5	–	0
Pacific (CA)	3	–	2	–	0	4	–	8	–	0
Cal State Fullerton	2	–	2	–	0	5	–	7	–	0
Long Beach State	1	–	4	–	0	5	–	6	–	0
Fresno State	1	–	4	–	0	3	–	8	–	0
+ – Conference co-champions; Utah State's game against Wyoming counted in the conference standings.

The 1978 Pacific Tigers football team represented the University of the Pacific (UOP) in the 1978 NCAA Division I-A football season as a member of the Pacific Coast Athletic Association. (Note: The Big West Conference was known as the Pacific Coast Athletic Association from its founding in 1969 through 1987.)

The team was led by head coach Chester Caddas, in his seventh year, and played their home games at Pacific Memorial Stadium (Note: Amos Alonzo Stagg Memorial Stadium was known as Pacific Memorial Stadium from its opening in 1950 through 1987.) in Stockton, California. They finished the season with a record of four wins and eight losses (4–8, 3–2 PCAA). The Tigers were outscored by their opponents 222–306 over the season.

== Schedule ==
Date	Opponent	Site	Result	Attendance	Source
September 9	at Arizona State*	Sun Devil Stadium; Tempe, AZ	L 7–42	69,527	
September 16	UC Davis*	Pacific Memorial Stadium; Stockton, CA	L 14–31	12,442	
September 23	at California*	California Memorial Stadium; Berkeley, CA	L 6–24	37,500	
September 30	Long Beach State	Pacific Memorial Stadium; Stockton, CA	W 14–0	8,932	
October 7	Cal State Fullerton	Pacific Memorial Stadium; Stockton, CA	W 35–17	8,464	
October 14	at Fresno State	Ratcliffe Stadium; Fresno, CA	W 27–7	8,279	
October 21	at San Diego State*	San Diego Stadium; San Diego, CA	L 28–31	37,219	
October 28	at Hawaii*	Aloha Stadium; Halawa, HI	W 27–17	36,867	
November 4	at Utah State	Romney Stadium; Logan, UT	L 14–40	15,264	
November 11	San Jose State^{†}	Pacific Memorial Stadium; Stockton, CA (Victory Bell)	L 31–33	14,000	
November 18	at New Mexico*	University Stadium; Albuquerque, NM	L 6–44	11,910	
November 25	Colorado State*	Pacific Memorial Stadium; Stockton, CA	L 13–20	5,000	
*Non-conference game; ^{†}Homecoming
