= 1978 Wichita State Shockers football team =

American college football season

1978 Wichita State Shockers football
- Conference: Missouri Valley Conference
- Record: 4–7 (2–4 MVC)
- Head coach: Jim Wright (5th season)
- Home stadium: Cessna Stadium

1978 Missouri Valley Conference football standings
	Conf.					Overall
Team	W		L		T	W		L		T
New Mexico State $	5	–	1	–	0	6	–	5	–	0
Tulsa	4	–	1	–	0	9	–	2	–	0
Southern Illinois	3	–	2	–	0	7	–	4	–	0
Drake	3	–	3	–	0	4	–	7	–	0
Indiana State	2	–	3	–	0	3	–	8	–	0
Wichita State	2	–	4	–	0	4	–	7	–	0
West Texas State	1	–	5	–	0	3	–	8	–	0
$ – Conference champion

The 1978 Wichita State Shockers football team was an American football team that represented Wichita State as a member of the Missouri Valley Conference during the 1978 NCAA Division I-A football season. In their fifth year under head coach Jim Wright, the team compiled a 4–7 record.

== Schedule ==
Date	Opponent	Site	Result	Attendance	Source
September 9	Oklahoma State*	Cessna Stadium; Wichita, KS	W 20–10	30,518	
September 16	New Mexico*	Cessna Stadium; Wichita, KS	L 14–16	18,016	
September 23	Idaho*	Cessna Stadium; Wichita, KS	W 28–6	13,123	
September 30	at West Texas State	Kimbrough Memorial Stadium; Canyon, TX	W 38–37		
October 7	at Drake	Drake Stadium; Des Moines, IA	L 22–48	9,230	
October 14	at Memphis State*	Liberty Bowl Memorial Stadium; Memphis, TN	L 13–26	19,813	
October 21	Southern Illinois	Cessna Stadium; Wichita, KS	W 33–7	12,026	
October 28	New Mexico State	Cessna Stadium; Wichita, KS	L 21–31	13,168	
November 4	Louisville*	Cessna Stadium; Wichita, KS	L 20–38	10,812	
November 11	Tulsa	Cessna Stadium; Wichita, KS	L 13–27	6,519	
November 18	at Indiana State	Memorial Stadium; Terre Haute, IN	L 18–42		
*Non-conference game
