= 1978 Drake Bulldogs football team =

American college football season

1978 Drake Bulldogs football
- Conference: Missouri Valley Conference
- Record: 4–7 (3–3 MVC)
- Head coach: Chuck Shelton (2nd season)
- Home stadium: Drake Stadium

1978 Missouri Valley Conference football standings
	Conf.					Overall
Team	W		L		T	W		L		T
New Mexico State $	5	–	1	–	0	6	–	5	–	0
Tulsa	4	–	1	–	0	9	–	2	–	0
Southern Illinois	3	–	2	–	0	7	–	4	–	0
Drake	3	–	3	–	0	4	–	7	–	0
Indiana State	2	–	3	–	0	3	–	8	–	0
Wichita State	2	–	4	–	0	4	–	7	–	0
West Texas State	1	–	5	–	0	3	–	8	–	0
$ – Conference champion

The 1978 Drake Bulldogs football team was an American football team that represented Drake University as a member of the Missouri Valley Conference (MVC) during the 1978 NCAA Division I-A football season. In their second year under head coach Chuck Shelton, the Bulldogs compiled an overall record of 4–7 record with a mark of 3–3 in conference play, placing fourth in the MVC. Drake played home games at Drake Stadium in Des Moines, Iowa.

== Schedule ==
Date	Opponent	Site	Result	Attendance	Source
September 2	UT Arlington*	Drake Stadium; Des Moines, IA	W 25–23	8,580	
September 9	Southern Illinois	Drake Stadium; Des Moines, IA	W 38–14	9,103	
September 16	Temple*	Drake Stadium; Des Moines, IA	L 29–36	9,345	
September 23	at Arkansas State*	Indian Stadium; Jonesboro, AR	L 0–10		
September 30	at No. 17 Iowa State*	Cylcone Stadium; Ames, IA	L 7–35	48,750	
October 7	Wichita State	Drake Stadium; Des Moines, IA	W 48–22	9,230	
October 14	at Indiana State	Memorial Stadium; Terre Haute, IN	L 0–13		
October 28	at Tulsa	Skelly Stadium; Tulsa, OK	L 20–44	17,500	
November 4	at New Mexico State	Aggie Memorial Stadium; Las Cruces, NM	L 29–21	18,578	
November 11	West Texas State	Drake Stadium; Des Moines, IA	W 24–21	6,521	
November 17	at Long Beach State*	Anaheim Stadium; Anaheim, CA	L 0–25	4,772	
*Non-conference game; Rankings from AP Poll released prior to the game
