= 1978 Toledo Rockets football team =

American college football season

1978 Toledo Rockets football
- Conference: Mid-American Conference
- Record: 2–9 (2–7 MAC)
- Head coach: Chuck Stobart (2nd season)
- Home stadium: Glass Bowl

1978 Mid-American Conference football standings
	Conf.					Overall
Team	W		L		T	W		L		T
Ball State $	8	–	0	–	0	10	–	1	–	0
Central Michigan	8	–	1	–	0	9	–	2	–	0
Miami (OH)	5	–	2	–	0	8	–	2	–	1
Western Michigan	5	–	4	–	0	7	–	4	–	0
Bowling Green	3	–	5	–	0	4	–	7	–	0
Ohio	3	–	5	–	0	3	–	8	–	0
Northern Illinois	2	–	4	–	0	5	–	6	–	0
Kent State	2	–	6	–	0	4	–	7	–	0
Toledo	2	–	7	–	0	2	–	9	–	0
Eastern Michigan	1	–	5	–	0	3	–	7	–	0
$ – Conference champion

The 1978 Toledo Rockets football team was an American football team that represented the University of Toledo in the Mid-American Conference (MAC) during the 1978 NCAA Division I-A football season. In their second season under head coach Chuck Stobart, the Rockets compiled a 2–9 record (2–7 against MAC opponents), finished in eighth place in the MAC, and were outscored by all opponents by a combined total of 256 to 144.

The team's statistical leaders included Maurice Hall with 610 passing yards, Mike Alston with 460 rushing yards, and Butch Hunyadi with 494 receiving yards.

== Schedule ==
Date	Opponent	Site	Result	Attendance	Source
September 9	Marshall*	Glass Bowl; Toledo, OH	L 0–17		
September 16	at Minnesota*	Memorial Stadium; Minneapolis, MN	L 12–38	31,223	
September 23	at Ball State	Ball State Stadium; Muncie, IN	L 0–20	15,630	
September 30	Eastern Michigan	Glass Bowl; Toledo, OH	L 12–17		
October 7	Bowling Green	Glass Bowl; Toledo, OH (rivalry)	L 27–45	18,383	
October 14	at Western Michigan	Waldo Stadium; Kalamazoo, MI	L 7–17	14,500	
October 21	at Ohio	Peden Stadium; Athens, OH	W 28–14	14,142	
October 28	Miami (OH)	Glass Bowl; Toledo, OH	L 7–28		
November 4	at Central Michigan	Perry Shorts Stadium; Mount Pleasant, MI	L 3–27	17,895	
November 11	Northern Illinois	Glass Bowl; Toledo, OH	W 35–16		
November 18	at Kent State	Dix Stadium; Kent, OH	L 13–17	4,847	
*Non-conference game
