= 1978 West Texas State Buffaloes football team =

American college football season

1978 West Texas State Buffaloes football
- Conference: Missouri Valley Conference
- Record: 3–8 (1–5 MVC)
- Head coach: Bill Yung (2nd season)
- Home stadium: Kimbrough Memorial Stadium

1978 Missouri Valley Conference football standings
	Conf.					Overall
Team	W		L		T	W		L		T
New Mexico State $	5	–	1	–	0	6	–	5	–	0
Tulsa	4	–	1	–	0	9	–	2	–	0
Southern Illinois	3	–	2	–	0	7	–	4	–	0
Drake	3	–	3	–	0	4	–	7	–	0
Indiana State	2	–	3	–	0	3	–	8	–	0
Wichita State	2	–	4	–	0	4	–	7	–	0
West Texas State	1	–	5	–	0	3	–	8	–	0
$ – Conference champion

The 1978 West Texas State Buffaloes football team was an American football team that represented West Texas State University—now known as West Texas A&M University—as a member of the Missouri Valley Conference (MVC) during the 1978 NCAA Division I-A football season. In their second year under head coach Bill Yung, the Buffaloes compiled an overall record of 3–8 with a mark of 1–5 in conference play, placing last out of seven teams in the MVC.

== Schedule ==
Date	Opponent	Site	Result	Attendance	Source
September 2	at Mississippi State*	Mississippi Veterans Memorial Stadium; Jackson, MS	L 0–28	30,000	
September 9	at UT Arlington*	Cravens Field; Arlington, TX	W 18–10	6,750	
September 16	McNeese State*	Kimbrough Memorial Stadium; Canyon, TX	L 13–45		
September 23	at Southern Illinois	McAndrew Stadium; Carbondale, IL	L 3–17	11,893	
September 30	Wichita State	Kimbrough Memorial Stadium; Canyon, TX	L 37–38		
October 7	North Texas State*	Kimbrough Memorial Stadium; Canyon, TX	L 0–35	17,660	
October 14	Lamar*^{†}	Kimbrough Memorial Stadium; Canyon, TX	W 55–16		
October 21	at Indiana State	Memorial Stadium; Terre Haute, IN	W 36–7		
November 4	at Tulsa	Skelly Stadium; Tulsa, OK	L 23–44	18,250	
November 11	at Drake	Drake Stadium; Des Moines, IA	L 21–24	6,521	
November 23	New Mexico State	Kimbrough Memorial Stadium; Canyon, TX	L 31–33		
*Non-conference game; ^{†}Homecoming
