= 1978 Fresno State Bulldogs football team =

American college football season

1978 Fresno State Bulldogs football
- Conference: Pacific Coast Athletic Association
- Record: 3–8 (1–4 PCAA)
- Head coach: Bob Padilla (1st season)
- Offensive coordinator: Dennis Erickson (3rd season)
- Home stadium: Ratcliffe Stadium

1978 Pacific Coast Athletic Association football standings
| | Conf. | | | | | Overall |
| Team | W | | L | | T | W | | L | | T |
|---|---|---|---|---|---|---|---|---|---|---|
| Utah State + | 4 | – | 1 | – | 0 | 7 | – | 4 | – | 0 |
| San Jose State + | 4 | – | 1 | – | 0 | 7 | – | 5 | – | 0 |
| Pacific (CA) | 3 | – | 2 | – | 0 | 4 | – | 8 | – | 0 |
| Cal State Fullerton | 2 | – | 2 | – | 0 | 5 | – | 7 | – | 0 |
| Long Beach State | 1 | – | 4 | – | 0 | 5 | – | 6 | – | 0 |
| Fresno State | 1 | – | 4 | – | 0 | 3 | – | 8 | – | 0 |
+ – Conference co-champions; Utah State's game against Wyoming counted in the conference standings.

The 1978 Fresno State Bulldogs football team represented California State University, Fresno as a member of the Pacific Coast Athletic Association (PCAA) during the 1978 NCAA Division I-A football season. Led by first-year head coach Bob Padilla, Fresno State compiled an overall record of 3–8 with a mark of 1–4 in conference play, tying for fifth place in the PCAA. The Bulldogs played their home games at Ratcliffe Stadium on the campus of Fresno City College in Fresno, California.

== Schedule ==
| Date | Opponent | Site | Result | Attendance | Source |
|---|---|---|---|---|---|
| September 9 | at McNeese State* | Cowboy Stadium; Lake Charles, LA | L 16–21 | 14,125 | |
| September 16 | Weber State* | Ratcliffe Stadium; Fresno, CA | W 55–14 | 11,373 | |
| September 23 | at Utah State | Romney Stadium; Logan, UT | L 22–45 | 15,507 | |
| September 30 | Cal Poly* | Ratcliffe Stadium; Fresno, CA | L 12–24 | 12,287 | |
| October 7 | at San Diego State* | Jack Murphy Stadium; San Diego, CA (rivalry) | L 14–31 | 42,424 | |
| October 14 | Pacific (CA) | Ratcliffe Stadium; Fresno, CA | L 7–27 | 8,279 | |
| October 21 | at San Jose State | Spartan Stadium; San Jose, CA (rivalry) | L 16–26 | 11,410 | |
| October 28 | Cal State Fullerton | Ratcliffe Stadium; Fresno, CA | L 8–37 | 7,928 | |
| November 4 | Long Beach State | Ratcliffe Stadium; Fresno, CA | W 42–41 | 8,963 | |
| November 11 | Montana State* | Ratcliffe Stadium; Fresno, CA | L 14–35 | 7,258 | |
| November 18 | at Idaho* | Kibbie Dome; Moscow, ID | W 41–28 | 5,500 | |
*Non-conference game

== Team players in the NFL ==
The following were selected in the 1979 NFL draft.

| Player | Position | Round | Overall | NFL team |
| Bob Rippentrop | Tight end | 11 | 281 | Tampa Bay Buccaneers |
| Mike Mince | Defensive back | 11 | 282 | New York Giants |

The following finished their college career in 1978, were not drafted, but played in the NFL.

| Player | Position | First NFL team |
| Wyatt Henderson | Defensive back | 1981 San Diego Chargers |
