= 1978 Cal State Fullerton Titans football team =

American college football season

1978 Cal State Fullerton Titans football
- Conference: Pacific Coast Athletic Association
- Record: 5–7 (2–2 PCAA)
- Head coach: Jim Colletto (4th season)
- Defensive coordinator: Larry Welsh (3rd season)
- Home stadium: Falcon Stadium

1978 Pacific Coast Athletic Association football standings
	Conf.					Overall
Team	W		L		T	W		L		T
Utah State +	4	–	1	–	0	7	–	4	–	0
San Jose State +	4	–	1	–	0	7	–	5	–	0
Pacific (CA)	3	–	2	–	0	4	–	8	–	0
Cal State Fullerton	2	–	2	–	0	5	–	7	–	0
Long Beach State	1	–	4	–	0	5	–	6	–	0
Fresno State	1	–	4	–	0	3	–	8	–	0
+ – Conference co-champions; Utah State's game against Wyoming counted in the conference standings.

The 1978 Cal State Fullerton Titans football team represented California State University, Fullerton as a member of the Pacific Coast Athletic Association (PCAA) during the 1978 NCAA Division I-A football season. Led by fourth-year head coach Jim Colletto, Cal State Fullerton compiled an overall record 5–7 with a mark of 2–2 in conference play, placing fourth in the PCAA. The Titans played home games at Falcon Stadium on the campus of Cerritos College in Norwalk, California.

== Schedule ==
Date	Opponent	Site	Result	Attendance	Source
September 9	at Boise State*	Bronco Stadium; Boise, ID	L 12–42	19,032	
September 16	Santa Clara*	Falcon Stadium; Norwalk, CA	W 35–20	3,500	
September 23	at Cal Poly*	Mustang Stadium; San Luis Obispo, CA	L 27–41	5,430	
September 30	at Hawaii*	Aloha Stadium; Halawa, HI	L 33–42	36,618	
October 7	at Pacific (CA)	Pacific Memorial Stadium; Stockton, CA	L 17–35	8,464	
October 14	Nevada*	Falcon Stadium; Norwalk, CA	L 14–37		
October 21	at Long Beach State	Anaheim Stadium; Anaheim, CA	W 34–9	8,435	
October 28	at Fresno State	Ratcliffe Stadium; Fresno, CA	W 37–8	7,928	
November 4	at San Jose State	Spartan Stadium; San Jose, CA	L 21–30	9,183	
November 11	at Cal State Northridge*	Devonshire Downs; Northridge, CA	W 31–20	2,500	
November 18	at Cal Poly Pomona*	Kellogg Field; Pomona, CA	W 30–22	1,200	
November 24	at UNLV*	Las Vegas Silver Bowl; Whitney, NV	L 7–24	17,005	
*Non-conference game

== Team players in the NFL ==
No Cal State Fullerton Titans were selected in the 1979 NFL draft.

The following finished their college career in 1978, were not drafted, but played in the NFL.

Player	Position	First NFL team
M.L. Carter	Defensive back	Kansas City Chiefs
Grady Richardson	Tight end	Washington Redskins
