= 1978 Independence Bowl =

East Carolina Pirates	Louisiana Tech Bulldogs
(8–3)	(6–4)
Independent	Southland Conference
35	13
Head coach: Pat Dye	Head coach: Maxie Lambright
	1	2	3	4	Total
East Carolina	14	7	7	7	35
Louisiana Tech	0	10	3	0	13
- Date: December 16, 1978
- Season: 1978
- Stadium: State Fair Stadium
- Location: Shreveport, Louisiana
- MVP: FB Theodore Sutton, ECU (Offensive); DE Zack Valentine, ECU (Defensive)
- Referee: Vance Carlson (Big Eight)
- Attendance: 31,054
- Payout: US$100,000

United States TV coverage
- Network: Mizlou

In the 1978 Independence Bowl, the East Carolina Pirates defeated the Louisiana Tech Bulldogs 35–13.

== Game summary ==
The East Carolina Pirates forced four fumbles and intercepted Louisiana Tech Bulldogs quarterback Eric Barkley three times en route to victory. ECU took control of the game early, scoring twice in the first quarter. The Pirates pushed their lead to 21–0 on a touchdown run early in the second quarter. The Bulldogs answered less than two minutes later with a 32-yard touchdown strike. Tech cut the lead to 21–10 with a 36-yard field goal less than a minute before the end of the half. Tech's Swilley kicked another 36-yard field goal six minutes into the third quarter. Pirate running back Theodore Sutton ran 45 yards for a touchdown with seven minutes remaining in the quarter. The Pirates scored another touchdown late in the game. ECU totaled 278 yards rushing, while holding the Bulldogs to 12 yards on the ground.

=== Scoring summary ===
Scoring summary

Quarter	Time	Drive			Team	Scoring information	Score	
Quarter	Time	Plays	Yards	TOP	Team	Scoring information	ECU	La. Tech
1	7:53	3	16		ECU	Anthony Collins 3-yard touchdown run, Bill Lamm kick good	7	0
1	0:39	8	49	3:30	ECU	Leander Green 1-yard touchdown run, Bill Lamm kick good	14	0
2	10:47	6	31	2:15	ECU	Anthony Collins 1-yard touchdown run, Bill Lamm kick good	21	0
2	9:05	5	65	1:42	La. Tech	Scooter Spruiell 32-yard touchdown reception from Keith Thibodeaux, Keith Swilley kick good	21	7
2	0:57	7	32	1:29	La. Tech	36-yard field goal by Keith Swilley	21	10
3	8:54	9	38	4:25	La. Tech	36-yard field goal by Keith Swilley	21	13
3	6:57	5	80	1:57	ECU	Theodore Sutton 45-yard touchdown run, Bill Lamm kick good	28	13
4	3:20	10	66	4:43	ECU	Eddie Hicks 2-yard touchdown run, Bill Lamm kick good	35	13
"TOP" = time of possession. For other American football terms, see Glossary of American football.							35	13

=== Statistics ===
	1	2	3	4	Total
Pirates	14	7	7	7	35
Bulldogs	0	10	3	0	13

Statistics	ECU	La. Tech
First downs	17	18
Total offense, yards	332	275
Rushes-yards (net)	67–278	33–12
Passing yards (net)	54	263
Passes, Comp-Att-Int	4–13–0	18–52–3
Time of Possession		

Team	Category	Player	Statistics
ECU	Passing	Leander Green	4/13, 54 yds
ECU	Rushing	Theodore Sutton	17 car, 143 yds, 1 TD
ECU	Receiving	Terry Gallaher	3 rec, 33 yds
La. Tech	Passing	Eric Barkley	12/39, 160 yds, 3 INT
La. Tech	Rushing	Jessie Clark	6 car, 28 yds
La. Tech	Receiving	Scooter Spruiell	7 rec, 130 yds, 1 TD
