= 1978 Northern Illinois Huskies football team =

American college football season

1978 Northern Illinois Huskies football
- Conference: Mid-American Conference
- Record: 5–6 (2–4 MAC)
- Head coach: Pat Culpepper (3rd season)
- MVPs: Pete Kraker; Dave Petzke; Mark Stuart
- Captain: All seniors
- Home stadium: Huskie Stadium

1978 Mid-American Conference football standings
	Conf.					Overall
Team	W		L		T	W		L		T
Ball State $	8	–	0	–	0	10	–	1	–	0
Central Michigan	8	–	1	–	0	9	–	2	–	0
Miami (OH)	5	–	2	–	0	8	–	2	–	1
Western Michigan	5	–	4	–	0	7	–	4	–	0
Bowling Green	3	–	5	–	0	4	–	7	–	0
Ohio	3	–	5	–	0	3	–	8	–	0
Northern Illinois	2	–	4	–	0	5	–	6	–	0
Kent State	2	–	6	–	0	4	–	7	–	0
Toledo	2	–	7	–	0	2	–	9	–	0
Eastern Michigan	1	–	5	–	0	3	–	7	–	0
$ – Conference champion

The 1978 Northern Illinois Huskies football team represented Northern Illinois University as a member of the Mid-American Conference (MAC) during 1978 NCAA Division I-A football season. Led by third-year head coach Pat Culpepper, the Huskies compiled an overall record of 5–6 with a mark of 2–4 in conference play, placing seventh in the MAC. Northern Illinois played home games at Huskie Stadium in DeKalb, Illinois.

== Schedule ==
Date	Opponent	Site	Result	Attendance	Source
September 16	Western Michigan	Huskie Stadium; DeKalb, IL	L 30–44		
September 23	at Northeast Louisiana*	Malone Stadium; Monroe, LA	L 10–27		
September 30	Illinois State*	Huskie Stadium; DeKalb, IL	W 49–21		
October 7	at Long Beach State*	Anaheim Stadium; Anaheim, CA	L 19–24	6,225	
October 14	Western Illinois*	Huskie Stadium; DeKalb, IL	W 24–20		
October 21	at Central Michigan	Perry Shorts Stadium; Mount Pleasant, MI	L 7–34	23,380	
October 28	at Southern Illinois*	McAndrew Stadium; Carbondale, IL	W 14–13	16,489	
November 4	Kent State	Huskie Stadium; DeKalb, IL	W 27–21		
November 11	at Toledo	Glass Bowl; Toledo, OH	L 16–35		
November 18	Ball State	Huskie Stadium; DeKalb, IL (rivalry)	L 13–31	8,041	
November 25	at Ohio	Peden Stadium; Athens, OH	W 23–14		
*Non-conference game
