= 1978 Harvard Crimson football team =

American college football season

1978 Harvard Crimson football
- Conference: Ivy League
- Record: 4–4–1 (2–4–1 Ivy)
- Head coach: Joe Restic (8th season)
- Captain: Steven C. Potysman
- Home stadium: Harvard Stadium

1978 Ivy League football standings
	Conf.					Overall
Team	W		L		T	W		L		T
Dartmouth $	6	–	1	–	0	6	–	3	–	0
Brown	5	–	2	–	0	6	–	3	–	0
Yale	4	–	1	–	2	5	–	2	–	2
Cornell	3	–	3	–	1	5	–	3	–	1
Harvard	2	–	4	–	1	4	–	4	–	1
Columbia	2	–	4	–	1	3	–	5	–	1
Princeton	1	–	4	–	2	2	–	5	–	2
Penn	1	–	5	–	1	2	–	6	–	1
$ – Conference champion

The 1978 Harvard Crimson football team was an American football team that represented Harvard University during the 1978 NCAA Division I-A football season. Harvard tied for fifth place in the Ivy League.

In their eighth year under head coach Joe Restic, the Crimson compiled a 4–4–1 record and outscored opponents 196 to 189. Steven C. Potysman was the team captain.

Harvard's 2–4–1 conference record tied for fifth in the Ivy League standings. The Crimson were outscored 168 to 162 by Ivy opponents.

Harvard played its home games at Harvard Stadium in the Allston neighborhood of Boston, Massachusetts.

== Schedule ==
Date	Opponent	Site	Result	Attendance	Source
September 23	Columbia	Harvard Stadium; Boston, MA	L 19–21	12,000	
September 30	UMass*	Harvard Stadium; Boston, MA	W 10–0	12,200	
October 7	Colgate*	Harvard Stadium; Boston, MA	W 24–21	12,500	
October 14	Cornell	Harvard Stadium; Boston, MA	L 20–25	6,000	
October 21	Dartmouth	Harvard Stadium; Boston, MA (rivalry)	W 24–19	28,500	
October 28	at Princeton	Palmer Stadium; Princeton, NJ (rivalry)	T 24–24	17,500	
November 4	Brown	Harvard Stadium; Boston, MA	L 30–31	23,000	
November 11	at Penn	Franklin Field; Philadelphia, PA	W 17–13	18,475	
November 18	Yale	Harvard Stadium; Boston, MA (The Game)	L 28–35	41,500	
*Non-conference game
