= 1978 Princeton Tigers football team =

American college football season

1978 Princeton Tigers football
- Conference: Ivy League
- Record: 2–5–2 (1–4–2 Ivy)
- Head coach: Frank Navarro (1st season)
- Captains: Gregory D. Bauman; Robert L. Ehrlich Jr.
- Home stadium: Palmer Stadium

1978 Ivy League football standings
	Conf.					Overall
Team	W		L		T	W		L		T
Dartmouth $	6	–	1	–	0	6	–	3	–	0
Brown	5	–	2	–	0	6	–	3	–	0
Yale	4	–	1	–	2	5	–	2	–	2
Cornell	3	–	3	–	1	5	–	3	–	1
Harvard	2	–	4	–	1	4	–	4	–	1
Columbia	2	–	4	–	1	3	–	5	–	1
Princeton	1	–	4	–	2	2	–	5	–	2
Penn	1	–	5	–	1	2	–	6	–	1
$ – Conference champion

The 1978 Princeton Tigers football team was an American football team that represented Princeton University during the 1978 NCAA Division I-A football season. Princeton finished seventh in the Ivy League.

In their first year under head coach Frank Navarro, the Tigers compiled a 2–5–2 record and were outscored 183 to 126. Gregory D. Bauman and Robert L. Ehrlich Jr. were the team captains.

Princeton's 1–4–2 conference record placed seventh in the Ivy League standings. The Tigers were outscored 147 to 113 by Ivy opponents.

Princeton played its home games at Palmer Stadium on the university campus in Princeton, New Jersey.

== Schedule ==
Date	Opponent	Site	Result	Attendance	Source
September 23	at Cornell	Schoellkopf Field; Ithaca, NY	T 14–14	15,000	
September 30	at Rutgers*	Giants Stadium; East Rutherford, NJ (rivalry)	L 0–24	25,307	
October 7	Brown	Palmer Stadium; Princeton, NJ	L 16-44	15,041	
October 14	at Columbia	Baker Field; New York, NY	L 10-14	7,175	
October 21	Colgate*	Palmer Stadium; Princeton, NJ	W 13-12	14,005	
October 28	Harvard	Palmer Stadium; Princeton, NJ (rivalry)	T 24-24	17,500	
November 4	Penn	Palmer Stadium; Princeton, NJ (rivalry)	W 21-0	10,354	
November 11	at Yale	Yale Bowl; New Haven, CT (rivalry)	L 7-23	32,000	
November 18	Dartmouth	Palmer Stadium; Princeton, NJ	L 21-28	19,565	
*Non-conference game
