= 1978 Columbia Lions football team =

American college football season

1978 Columbia Lions football
- Conference: Ivy League
- Record: 3–5–1 (2–4–1 Ivy)
- Head coach: Bill Campbell (5th season)
- Captains: Mike McGraw; Artie Pulsinelli
- Home stadium: Baker Field

1978 Ivy League football standings
| | Conf. | | | | | Overall |
| Team | W | | L | | T | W | | L | | T |
|---|---|---|---|---|---|---|---|---|---|---|
| Dartmouth $ | 6 | – | 1 | – | 0 | 6 | – | 3 | – | 0 |
| Brown | 5 | – | 2 | – | 0 | 6 | – | 3 | – | 0 |
| Yale | 4 | – | 1 | – | 2 | 5 | – | 2 | – | 2 |
| Cornell | 3 | – | 3 | – | 1 | 5 | – | 3 | – | 1 |
| Harvard | 2 | – | 4 | – | 1 | 4 | – | 4 | – | 1 |
| Columbia | 2 | – | 4 | – | 1 | 3 | – | 5 | – | 1 |
| Princeton | 1 | – | 4 | – | 2 | 2 | – | 5 | – | 2 |
| Penn | 1 | – | 5 | – | 1 | 2 | – | 6 | – | 1 |
$ – Conference champion

The 1978 Columbia Lions football team was an American football team that represented Columbia University during the 1978 NCAA Division I-A football season. Columbia tied for fifth place in the Ivy League.

In their fifth season under head coach Bill Campbell, the Lions compiled a 3–5–1 record and were outscored 228 to 111. Mike McGraw and Artie Pulsinelli were the team captains.

The Lions' 2–4–1 conference record placed them in a two-way tie for fifth place in the Ivy League standings. Columbia was outscored 159 to 90 by Ivy opponents.

Columbia played its home games at Baker Field in Upper Manhattan, in New York City.

== Schedule ==
| Date | Opponent | Site | Result | Attendance | Source |
|---|---|---|---|---|---|
| September 23 | at Harvard | Harvard Stadium; Boston, MA | W 21–19 | 12,000 | |
| September 30 | Lafayette* | Baker Field; New York, NY | W 21–0 | 4,500 | |
| October 7 | at Penn | Franklin Field; Philadelphia, PA | L 19–31 | 11,627 | |
| October 14 | Princeton^{†} | Baker Field; New York, NY | W 14–10 | 7,175 | |
| October 21 | at Yale | Yale Bowl; New Haven, CT | T 3–3 | 19,000 | |
| October 28 | vs. Rutgers* | Giants Stadium; East Rutherford, NJ | L 0–69 | 7,665 | |
| November 4 | at Dartmouth | Memorial Field; Hanover, NH | L 7–37 | 9,500 | |
| November 11 | Cornell | Baker Field; New York, NY (rivalry) | L 14–35 | 7,105 | |
| November 18 | Brown | Baker Field; New York, NY | L 12–24 | 6,150 | |
*Non-conference game; ^{†}Homecoming
