= 1978 Tulsa Golden Hurricane football team =

American college football season

1978 Tulsa Golden Hurricane football
- Conference: Missouri Valley Conference
- Record: 9–2 (4–1 MVC)
- Head coach: John Cooper (2nd season)
- Home stadium: Skelly Stadium

1978 Missouri Valley Conference football standings
	Conf.					Overall
Team	W		L		T	W		L		T
New Mexico State $	5	–	1	–	0	6	–	5	–	0
Tulsa	4	–	1	–	0	9	–	2	–	0
Southern Illinois	3	–	2	–	0	7	–	4	–	0
Drake	3	–	3	–	0	4	–	7	–	0
Indiana State	2	–	3	–	0	3	–	8	–	0
Wichita State	2	–	4	–	0	4	–	7	–	0
West Texas State	1	–	5	–	0	3	–	8	–	0
$ – Conference champion

The 1978 Tulsa Golden Hurricane football team represented the University of Tulsa as a member of the Missouri Valley Conference during the 1978 NCAA Division I-A football season. In their second year under head coach John Cooper, the Golden Hurricane compiled an overall record of 9–2 record with a mark of 4–1 in conference play, placing second in the MVC. The team defeated Virginia Tech (35–33), Kansas State (24–14), Louisville (24–7), Cincinnati (27–26), and Wichita State (27–13), but lost to No. 2-ranked Arkansas (21–13) and MVC champion New Mexico State (23–20).

The team's statistical leaders included quarterback David Rader with 1,683 passing yards, Sherman Johnson with 826 rushing yards, and Rickey Watts with 730 receiving yards. Head coach John Cooper was later inducted into the College Football Hall of Fame.

== Schedule ==
Date	Opponent	Site	Result	Attendance	Source
September 2	Arkansas State*	Skelly Stadium; Tulsa, OK	W 21–20	20,900	
September 9	at Virginia Tech*	Lane Stadium; Blacksburg, VA	W 35–33	26,000	
September 16	Southwestern Louisiana*	Skelly Stadium; Tulsa, OK	W 10–3	21,500	
September 23	Kansas State*^{†}	Skelly Stadium; Tulsa, OK	W 24–14	22,000	
September 30	at No. 2 Arkansas*	Razorback Stadium; Fayetteville, AR	L 13–21	45,435	
October 7	Louisville (Note: Designated conference game)	Skelly Stadium; Tulsa, OK	W 24–7	20,500	
October 14	at New Mexico State	Aggie Memorial Stadium; Las Cruces, NM	L 20–23	12,337	
October 21	at Cincinnati*	Nippert Stadium; Cincinnati, OH	W 27–26	11,521	
October 28	Drake	Skelly Stadium; Tulsa, OK	W 44–20	17,500	
November 4	West Texas State	Skelly Stadium; Tulsa, OK	W 44–23	18,250	
November 11	at Wichita State	Cessna Stadium; Wichita, KS	W 27–13	6,519	
*Non-conference game; ^{†}Homecoming; Rankings from AP Poll released prior to the game

== After the season ==
=== 1979 NFL draft ===
The following Golden Hurricane players were selected in the 1979 NFL draft following the season.

Round	Pick	Player	Position	NFL club
2	39	Rickey Watts	Wide receiver	Chicago Bears
4	106	Eddie Hare	Punter	New England Patriots
8	202	Doug Panfil	Guard	New Orleans Saints
11	295	David Rader	Quarterback	San Diego Chargers
