= 1978 Central Michigan Chippewas football team =

American college football season

1978 Central Michigan Chippewas football
- Conference: Mid-American Conference
- Record: 9–2 (8–1 MAC)
- Head coach: Herb Deromedi (1st season)
- MVP: Bryan Gross
- Home stadium: Perry Shorts Stadium

1978 Mid-American Conference football standings
	Conf.					Overall
Team	W		L		T	W		L		T
Ball State $	8	–	0	–	0	10	–	1	–	0
Central Michigan	8	–	1	–	0	9	–	2	–	0
Miami (OH)	5	–	2	–	0	8	–	2	–	1
Western Michigan	5	–	4	–	0	7	–	4	–	0
Bowling Green	3	–	5	–	0	4	–	7	–	0
Ohio	3	–	5	–	0	3	–	8	–	0
Northern Illinois	2	–	4	–	0	5	–	6	–	0
Kent State	2	–	6	–	0	4	–	7	–	0
Toledo	2	–	7	–	0	2	–	9	–	0
Eastern Michigan	1	–	5	–	0	3	–	7	–	0
$ – Conference champion

The 1978 Central Michigan Chippewas football team represented Central Michigan University in the Mid-American Conference (MAC) during the 1978 NCAA Division I-A football season. In their first season under head coach Herb Deromedi, the Chippewas compiled a 9–2 record (8–1 against MAC opponents), finished in second place in the MAC standings, held seven of eleven opponents to fewer than ten points, and outscored all opponents, 331 to 119. The season marked the beginning of a school record 23-game unbeaten streak that ran from October 7, 1978, to October 11, 1980. The team played its home games in Perry Shorts Stadium in Mount Pleasant, Michigan, with attendance of 98,011 in five home games.

The team's statistical leaders included quarterback Gary Hogeboom with 1,095 passing yards, Willie Todd with 746 rushing yards, and Brian Blank with 384 receiving yards. Linebacker Bryan Gross received the team's most valuable player award. Offensive guard Tim Sopha, placekicker Rade Savich, and defensive back Robert Jackson received first-team All-MAC honors. Savich broke the school record with 15 field goals in a season and tied a school record with 38 point after touchdown kicks in a season.

Herb Deromedi, a native of Royal Oak, Michigan, was hired as Central Michigan's head football coach in August 1978. He had previously been the Chippewas' defensive coordinator under head coach Roy Kramer. He replaced Kramer, who left the program to become the athletic director at Vanderbilt University. Deromedi remained the program's head football coach for 16 years, compiling a 110–55–10 record. He was inducted into the College Football Hall of Fame in 2007.

== Schedule ==
Date	Opponent	Site	Result	Attendance	Source
September 9	Kent State	Perry Shorts Stadium; Mount Pleasant, MI	W 41–0		
September 16	at Miami (OH)	Miami Field; Oxford, OH	W 37–18	10,170	
September 23	at Alcorn State*	Mississippi Veterans Memorial Stadium; Jackson, MS	L 16–24		
September 30	Ball State	Perry Shorts Stadium; Mount Pleasant, MI	L 0–27	20,216	
October 7	at Ohio	Peden Stadium; Athens, OH	W 17–3		
October 14	Illinois State*	Perry Shorts Stadium; Mount Pleasant, MI	W 45–7		
October 21	Northern Illinois	Perry Shorts Stadium; Mount Pleasant, MI	W 34–7	23,380	
October 28	at Bowling Green	Doyt Perry Stadium; Bowling Green, OH	W 38–7		
November 4	Toledo	Perry Shorts Stadium; Mount Pleasant, MI	W 27–3	17,895	
November 11	at Eastern Michigan	Rynearson Stadium; Ypsilanti, MI (rivalry)	W 41–9		
November 18	at Western Michigan	Waldo Stadium; Kalamazoo, MI (rivalry)	W 35–14		
*Non-conference game
