= 1978 Western Michigan Broncos football team =

American college football season

1978 Western Michigan Broncos football
- Conference: Mid-American Conference
- Record: 7–4 (5–4 MAC)
- Head coach: Elliot Uzelac (4th season)
- MVP: Jerome Persell
- Captains: Jerome Persell; Keith Rogien; Greg Williams
- Home stadium: Waldo Stadium

1978 Mid-American Conference football standings
	Conf.					Overall
Team	W		L		T	W		L		T
Ball State $	8	–	0	–	0	10	–	1	–	0
Central Michigan	8	–	1	–	0	9	–	2	–	0
Miami (OH)	5	–	2	–	0	8	–	2	–	1
Western Michigan	5	–	4	–	0	7	–	4	–	0
Bowling Green	3	–	5	–	0	4	–	7	–	0
Ohio	3	–	5	–	0	3	–	8	–	0
Northern Illinois	2	–	4	–	0	5	–	6	–	0
Kent State	2	–	6	–	0	4	–	7	–	0
Toledo	2	–	7	–	0	2	–	9	–	0
Eastern Michigan	1	–	5	–	0	3	–	7	–	0
$ – Conference champion

The 1978 Western Michigan Broncos football team represented Western Michigan University in the Mid-American Conference (MAC) during the 1978 NCAA Division I-A football season. In their fourth season under head coach Elliot Uzelac, the Broncos compiled a 7–4 record (5–4 against MAC opponents), finished in fourth place in the MAC, and outscored their opponents, 220 to 152. The team played its home games at Waldo Stadium in Kalamazoo, Michigan.

The team's statistical leaders included Albert Little with 828 passing yards, Jerome Persell with 1,346 rushing yards, and Tim Clysdale with 213 receiving yards. Tailback Jerome Persell, fullback Keith Rogien, and safety Greg Williams were the team captains. For the third consecutive year, tailback Jerome Persell received the team's most outstanding player award. Persell was also named MAC offensive player of the year for the third consecutive year.

== Schedule ==
Date	Opponent	Site	Result	Attendance	Source
September 9	Illinois State*	Waldo Stadium; Kalamazoo, MI	W 27–17	19,500	
September 16	at Northern Illinois	Huskie Stadium; DeKalb, IL	W 44–30		
September 23	at Miami (OH)	Miami Field; Oxford, OH	L 3–7	10,033	
September 30	Bowling Green	Waldo Stadium; Kalamazoo, MI	W 24–20	20,629	
October 7	at Kent State	Dix Stadium; Kent, OH	W 14–0		
October 14	Toledo	Waldo Stadium; Kalamazoo, MI	W 17–7	14,500	
October 21	Eastern Michigan	Waldo Stadium; Kalamazoo, MI	W 32–0		
October 28	Ohio	Waldo Stadium; Kalamazoo, MI	L 7–10		
November 4	at Marshall*	Fairfield Stadium; Huntington, WV	W 24–6	10,000	
November 11	at Ball State	Ball State Stadium; Muncie, IN	L 14–20	17,110	
November 18	Central Michigan	Waldo Stadium; Kalamazoo, MI (rivalry)	L 14–35		
*Non-conference game
