= 1978 Brown Bears football team =

American college football season

1978 Brown Bears football
- Conference: Ivy League
- Record: 6–3 (5–2 Ivy)
- Head coach: John Anderson (6th season)
- Captains: N. Jacob; M. Whipple
- Home stadium: Brown Stadium

1978 Ivy League football standings
	Conf.					Overall
Team	W		L		T	W		L		T
Dartmouth $	6	–	1	–	0	6	–	3	–	0
Brown	5	–	2	–	0	6	–	3	–	0
Yale	4	–	1	–	2	5	–	2	–	2
Cornell	3	–	3	–	1	5	–	3	–	1
Harvard	2	–	4	–	1	4	–	4	–	1
Columbia	2	–	4	–	1	3	–	5	–	1
Princeton	1	–	4	–	2	2	–	5	–	2
Penn	1	–	5	–	1	2	–	6	–	1
$ – Conference champion

The 1978 Brown Bears football team was an American football team that represented Brown University during the 1978 NCAA Division I-A football season. Brown tied for second place in the Ivy League.

In their fourth season under head coach John Anderson, the Bears compiled a 6–3 record and outscored opponents 189 to 165. N. Jacob and M. Whipple were the team captains.

The Bears' 6–3 conference record tied for second-best in the Ivy League standings. They outscored Ivy opponents 155 to 123.

Brown played its home games at Brown Stadium in Providence, Rhode Island.

== Schedule ==
Date	Opponent	Site	Result	Attendance	Source
September 23	Yale	Brown Stadium; Providence, RI	L 0–21	15,812	
September 30	Rhode Island*	Brown Stadium; Providence, RI (rivalry)	L 3–17	8,500	
October 7	at Princeton	Palmer Stadium; Princeton, NJ	W 44–16	15,041	
October 14	Penn	Brown Stadium; Providence, RI	W 14–0	2,600	
October 21	at Cornell	Schoellkopf Field; Ithaca, NY	W 21–13	10,524	
October 28	Holy Cross*	Brown Stadium; Providence, RI	W 31–25	15,000	
November 4	at Harvard	Harvard Stadium; Boston, MA	W 31–30	23,000	
November 11	Dartmouth	Brown Stadium; Providence, RI	L 21–31	17,200	
November 18	at Columbia	Baker Field; New York, NY	W 24–12	6,150	
*Non-conference game
