= 1978 Bowling Green Falcons football team =

American college football season

1978 Bowling Green Falcons football
- Conference: Mid-American Conference
- Record: 4–7 (3–5 MAC)
- Head coach: Denny Stolz (2nd season)
- Offensive coordinator: Mike Rasmussen (2nd season)
- Home stadium: Doyt Perry Stadium

1978 Mid-American Conference football standings
	Conf.					Overall
Team	W		L		T	W		L		T
Ball State $	8	–	0	–	0	10	–	1	–	0
Central Michigan	8	–	1	–	0	9	–	2	–	0
Miami (OH)	5	–	2	–	0	8	–	2	–	1
Western Michigan	5	–	4	–	0	7	–	4	–	0
Bowling Green	3	–	5	–	0	4	–	7	–	0
Ohio	3	–	5	–	0	3	–	8	–	0
Northern Illinois	2	–	4	–	0	5	–	6	–	0
Kent State	2	–	6	–	0	4	–	7	–	0
Toledo	2	–	7	–	0	2	–	9	–	0
Eastern Michigan	1	–	5	–	0	3	–	7	–	0
$ – Conference champion

The 1978 Bowling Green Falcons football team represented Bowling Green State University in the 1978 NCAA Division I-A football season. The Falcons finished the season with a 4–7 record.

== Schedule ==
Date	Opponent	Site	Result	Attendance	Source
September 9	at Villanova*	Villanova Stadium; Villanova, PA	L 28–35	6,244	
September 16	at Eastern Michigan	Rynearson Stadium; Ypsilanti, MI	W 43–6		
September 23	Grand Valley State*	Doyt Perry Stadium; Bowling Green, OH	W 49–3	14,846	
September 30	at Western Michigan	Waldo Stadium; Kalamazoo, MI	L 20–24	20,629	
October 7	at Toledo	Glass Bowl; Toledo, OH (rivalry)	W 45–27	18,383	
October 14	Kent State	Doyt L. Perry Stadium; Bowling Green, OH (rivalry)	W 28–20		
October 21	at Miami (OH)	Miami Field; Oxford, OH	L 7–18	18,251	
October 28	Central Michigan	Doyt L. Perry Stadium; Bowling Green, OH	L 7–38		
November 4	Ball State	Doyt L. Perry Stadium; Bowling Green, OH	L 14–39	15,069	
November 11	at Southern Miss*	M. M. Roberts Stadium; Hattiesburg, MS	L 21–38	16,846	
November 18	Ohio	Doyt L. Perry Stadium; Bowling Green, OH	L 15–19	6,447	
*Non-conference game
