= 1978 Eastern Michigan Hurons football team =

American college football season

1978 Eastern Michigan Hurons football
- Conference: Mid-American Conference
- Record: 3–7 (1–5 MAC)
- Head coach: Mike Stock (1st season)
- Captains: Rollie Hansen; Gordon Skotarczak; Tom Williams
- Home stadium: Rynearson Stadium

1978 Mid-American Conference football standings
	Conf.					Overall
Team	W		L		T	W		L		T
Ball State $	8	–	0	–	0	10	–	1	–	0
Central Michigan	8	–	1	–	0	9	–	2	–	0
Miami (OH)	5	–	2	–	0	8	–	2	–	1
Western Michigan	5	–	4	–	0	7	–	4	–	0
Bowling Green	3	–	5	–	0	4	–	7	–	0
Ohio	3	–	5	–	0	3	–	8	–	0
Northern Illinois	2	–	4	–	0	5	–	6	–	0
Kent State	2	–	6	–	0	4	–	7	–	0
Toledo	2	–	7	–	0	2	–	9	–	0
Eastern Michigan	1	–	5	–	0	3	–	7	–	0
$ – Conference champion

The 1978 Eastern Michigan Hurons football team represented Eastern Michigan University in the 1978 NCAA Division I-A football season. In their first season under head coach Mike Stock, the Hurons compiled a 3–7 record (1–5 against conference opponents), finished in last place in the Mid-American Conference, and were outscored by their opponents, 238 to 122. The team's statistical leaders included Burt Beaney with 833 passing yards, Doug Crisan with 485 rushing yards, and Tom Parm with 363 receiving yards.

== Schedule ==
Date	Opponent	Site	Result	Attendance	Source
September 2	at Northern Michigan*	Memorial Field; Marquette, MI	L 3–30	9,338	
September 9	at Ohio	Peden Stadium; Athens, OH	L 22–23		
September 16	Bowling Green*	Rynearson Stadium; Ypsilanti, MI	L 6–43		
September 23	Indiana State*	Rynearson Stadium; Ypsilanti, MI	W 27–8		
September 30	at Toledo	Glass Bowl; Toledo, OH	W 17–12		
October 14	Akron *^{†}	Rynearson Stadium; Ypsilanti, MI	W 25–14	7,298	
October 21	at Western Michigan	Waldo Stadium; Kalamazoo, MI	L 0–32		
October 28	Ball State	Rynearson Stadium; Ypsilanti, MI	L 0–21	5,505	
November 11	Central Michigan	Rynearson Stadium; Ypsilanti, MI (rivalry)	L 9–41		
November 18	at Illinois State*	Hancock Stadium; Normal, IL	L 13–14	2,600	
*Non-conference game; ^{†}Homecoming
