= 1978 Lamar Cardinals football team =

American college football season

1978 Lamar Cardinals football
- Conference: Southland Conference
- Record: 2–8–1 (0–5 Southland)
- Head coach: Bob Frederick (3rd season)
- Home stadium: Cardinal Stadium

1978 Southland Conference football standings
	Conf.					Overall
Team	W		L		T	W		L		T
Louisiana Tech +	4	–	1	–	0	6	–	5	–	0
Arkansas State +	4	–	1	–	0	7	–	4	–	0
UT Arlington	3	–	2	–	0	5	–	6	–	0
McNeese State	2	–	3	–	0	7	–	4	–	0
Southwestern Louisiana	2	–	3	–	0	3	–	8	–	0
Lamar	0	–	5	–	0	2	–	8	–	1
+ – Conference co-champions

The 1978 Lamar Cardinals football team represented Lamar University in the 1978 NCAA Division I-A football season as a member of the Southland Conference. NCAA Division I split into Division I-A, the current Football Bowl Subdivision (FBS), and Division I-AA, the current Football Championship Subdivision (FCS), for football in 1978. Lamar and the Southland Conference opted to compete at the Division I-A level. The Cardinals played their home games at Cardinal Stadium now named Provost Umphrey Stadium in Beaumont, Texas. Lamar finished the 1978 season with a 2–8–1 overall record and a 0–5 conference record. The 1978 season marked Bob Frederick's final season as Lamar's head football coach.

== Schedule ==
Date	Opponent	Site	Result	Attendance	Source
September 9	at Northwestern State*	Harry Turpin Stadium; Natchitoches, LA	L 17–21	9,500	
September 16	Southern Illinois*	Cardinal Stadium; Beaumont, TX	L 20–22	13,100	
September 23	Stephen F. Austin*	Cardinal Stadium; Beaumont, TX	W 23–16		
September 30	at Southwestern Louisiana*	Cajun Field; Lafayette, LA (rivalry)	L 16–23		
October 7	Northeast Louisiana*	Cardinal Stadium; Beaumont, TX	T 17–17		
October 14	at West Texas State*	Kimbrough Memorial Stadium; Canyon, TX	L 16–55		
October 21	UT Arlington	Cardinal Stadium; Beaumont, TX	L 17–37	4,200	
November 4	at Louisiana Tech	Joe Aillet Stadium; Ruston, LA	L 3–40	10,000	
November 11	McNeese State	Cardinal Stadium; Beaumont, TX (rivalry)	L 23–24		
November 18	at Arkansas State	Indian Stadium; Jonesboro, AR	L 3–6	8,679	
November 25	Long Beach State*	Cardinal Stadium; Beaumont, TX	W 36–31	1,000	
*Non-conference game
