= 1978 Southern Illinois Salukis football team =

American college football season

1978 Southern Illinois Salukis football
- Conference: Missouri Valley Conference
- Record: 7–4 (3–2 MVC)
- Head coach: Rey Dempsey (3rd season)
- Home stadium: McAndrew Stadium

1978 Missouri Valley Conference football standings
	Conf.					Overall
Team	W		L		T	W		L		T
New Mexico State $	5	–	1	–	0	6	–	5	–	0
Tulsa	4	–	1	–	0	9	–	2	–	0
Southern Illinois	3	–	2	–	0	7	–	4	–	0
Drake	3	–	3	–	0	4	–	7	–	0
Indiana State	2	–	3	–	0	3	–	8	–	0
Wichita State	2	–	4	–	0	4	–	7	–	0
West Texas State	1	–	5	–	0	3	–	8	–	0
$ – Conference champion

The 1978 Southern Illinois Salukis football team was an American football team that represented Southern Illinois University (now known as Southern Illinois University Carbondale) in the Missouri Valley Conference (MVC) during the 1978 NCAA Division I-A football season. Under third-year head coach Rey Dempsey, the team compiled a 7–4 record. The team played its home games at McAndrew Stadium in Carbondale, Illinois.

== Schedule ==
Date	Opponent	Site	Result	Attendance	Source
September 9	at Drake	Drake Stadium; Des Moines, IA	L 14–38	9,103	
September 16	at Lamar*	Cardinal Stadium; Beaumont, TX	W 22–20	13,100	
September 23	West Texas State	McAndrew Stadium; Carbondale, IL	W 17–3	11,893	
September 30	New Mexico State	McAndrew Stadium; Carbondale, IL	W 43–39	14,112	
October 7	at Illinois State*	Hancock Stadium; Normal, IL	W 26–0	13,500	
October 14	Arkansas State*	McAndrew Stadium; Carbondale, IL	L 24–26	15,446	
October 21	at Wichita State	Cessna Stadium; Wichita, KS	L 7–33	12,026	
October 28	Northern Illinois*	McAndrew Stadium; Carbondale, IL	L 13–14	16,489	
November 4	at Indiana State	Memorial Stadium; Terre Haute, IN	W 28–7	4,785	
November 11	Marshall*	McAndrew Stadium; Carbondale, IL	W 15–14	7,110	
November 18	at Southwestern Louisiana*	Cajun Field; Lafayette, LA	W 10–9	11,150	
*Non-conference game
