= 1978 Utah State Aggies football team =

American college football season

1978 Utah State Aggies football

PCAA co-champion
- Conference: Pacific Coast Athletic Association
- Record: 7–4 (4–1 PCAA)
- Head coach: Bruce Snyder (3rd season)
- Home stadium: Romney Stadium

1978 Pacific Coast Athletic Association football standings
	Conf.					Overall
Team	W		L		T	W		L		T
Utah State +	4	–	1	–	0	7	–	4	–	0
San Jose State +	4	–	1	–	0	7	–	5	–	0
Pacific (CA)	3	–	2	–	0	4	–	8	–	0
Cal State Fullerton	2	–	2	–	0	5	–	7	–	0
Long Beach State	1	–	4	–	0	5	–	6	–	0
Fresno State	1	–	4	–	0	3	–	8	–	0
+ – Conference co-champions; Utah State's game against Wyoming counted in the conference standings.

The 1978 Utah State Aggies football team represented Utah State University as a new member of the Pacific Coast Athletic Association (PCAA) during the 1978 NCAA Division I-A football season . Led by third-year head coach Bruce Snyder, the previously-independent Aggies played their home games on campus at Romney Stadium in Logan, Utah. They opened with five wins and finished with a 7–4 record (4–1 PCAA, tied for first).

A noteworthy game was against Idaho State (of nearby Pocatello), the first college football season-opener played in Japan.

== Schedule ==
Date	Opponent	Site	Result	Attendance	Source
September 3	vs. Idaho State*	Hankyu Nishinomiya Stadium; Nishinomiya, Japan	W 10–0	25,000	
September 16	at Colorado State*	Hughes Stadium; Fort Collins, CO	W 21–20	24,285	
September 23	Fresno State	Romney Stadium; Logan, UT	W 45–22	15,570	
September 30	at Wyoming (Note: Utah State's game against Wyoming, a member of the Western Athletic Conference (WAC), counted in the Pacific Coast Athletic Association (PCAA) standings for the Aggies, who did not play Cal State Fullerton.)	War Memorial Stadium; Laramie, WY (rivalry)	W 20–13	23,257	
October 7	at BYU*	Cougar Stadium; Provo, UT (rivalry)	W 24–7	32,668	
October 14	Long Beach State	Romney Stadium; Logan, UT	L 17–33	15,800	
October 21	at Miami (FL)*	Miami Orange Bowl; Miami, FL	L 16–17	25,702	
October 28	San Jose State	Romney Stadium; Logan, UT	W 31–21	18,226	
November 4	Pacific (CA)	Romney Stadium; Logan, UT	W 40–14	15,264	
November 11	Weber State*	Romney Stadium; Logan, UT	L 25–44	6,102	
November 25	Utah*	Romney Stadium; Logan, UT (rivalry)	L 20–23	12,260	
*Non-conference game

== Roster ==
1978 Utah State Aggies football team roster
Players
Coaches
Offense

Pos.	#	Name	Class
QB	18	Craig Bradshaw	Jr
WR	25	Ron Cassidy	Sr
QB	10	Eric Hipple	Jr
WR	81	James Murphy	So
RB	24	Rick Parros	Jr
TE	82	John Thompson	Sr

Defense

Pos.	#	Name	Class
DT	80	Rulon Jones	Jr

Special teams

Pos.	#	Name	Class

Head coach

- Bruce Snyder

Coordinators/assistant coaches

Legend

- (C) Team captain
- (S) Suspended
- (I) Ineligible
- Injured
- Redshirt
