= 1978 Ohio Bobcats football team =

American college football season

1978 Ohio Bobcats football
- Conference: Mid-American Conference
- Record: 3–8 (3–5 MAC)
- Head coach: Bob Kappes (1st season)
- Home stadium: Peden Stadium

1978 Mid-American Conference football standings
	Conf.					Overall
Team	W		L		T	W		L		T
Ball State $	8	–	0	–	0	10	–	1	–	0
Central Michigan	8	–	1	–	0	9	–	2	–	0
Miami (OH)	5	–	2	–	0	8	–	2	–	1
Western Michigan	5	–	4	–	0	7	–	4	–	0
Bowling Green	3	–	5	–	0	4	–	7	–	0
Ohio	3	–	5	–	0	3	–	8	–	0
Northern Illinois	2	–	4	–	0	5	–	6	–	0
Kent State	2	–	6	–	0	4	–	7	–	0
Toledo	2	–	7	–	0	2	–	9	–	0
Eastern Michigan	1	–	5	–	0	3	–	7	–	0
$ – Conference champion

The 1978 Ohio Bobcats football team was an American football team that represented Ohio University in the Mid-American Conference (MAC) during the 1978 NCAA Division I-A football season. In their first and only season under head coach Bob Kappes, the Bobcats compiled a 3–8 record (3–5 against MAC opponents), finished in a tie for fifth place in the MAC, and were outscored by all opponents by a combined total of 246 to 120. They played their home games in Peden Stadium in Athens, Ohio.

== Schedule ==
Date	Opponent	Site	Result	Attendance	Source
September 9	Eastern Michigan	Peden Stadium; Athens, OH	W 23–22		
September 23	at Purdue*	Ross–Ade Stadium; West Lafayette, IN	L 0–24	55,172	
September 30	at Kent State	Dix Stadium; Kent, OH	L 14–20		
October 7	Central Michigan	Peden Stadium; Athens, OH	L 3–17		
October 14	at South Carolina*	Williams–Brice Stadium; Columbia, SC	L 7–24	50,188	
October 21	Toledo	Peden Stadium; Athens, OH	L 14–28	14,142	
October 28	at Western Michigan	Waldo Stadium; Kalamazoo, MI	W 10–7		
November 4	Miami (OH)	Peden Stadium; Athens, OH (rivalry)	L 16–31	15,023	
November 11	at Cincinnati*	Nippert Stadium; Cincinnati, OH	L 0–35	14,587	
November 18	at Bowling Green	Doyt Perry Stadium; Bowling Green, OH	W 19–15	6,447	
November 25	Northern Illinois	Peden Stadium; Athens, OH	L 14–23		
*Non-conference game
