= 1978 Louisiana Tech Bulldogs football team =

American college football season

1978 Louisiana Tech Bulldogs football

Southland co-champion

Independence Bowl, L 13–35 vs. East Carolina
- Conference: Southland Conference
- Record: 6–5 (4–1 Southland)
- Head coach: Maxie Lambright (12th season)
- Captains: Ronnie Paggett; Scooter Spruell
- Home stadium: Joe Aillet Stadium

1978 Southland Conference football standings
	Conf.					Overall
Team	W		L		T	W		L		T
Louisiana Tech +	4	–	1	–	0	6	–	5	–	0
Arkansas State +	4	–	1	–	0	7	–	4	–	0
UT Arlington	3	–	2	–	0	5	–	6	–	0
McNeese State	2	–	3	–	0	7	–	4	–	0
Southwestern Louisiana	2	–	3	–	0	3	–	8	–	0
Lamar	0	–	5	–	0	2	–	8	–	1
+ – Conference co-champions

The 1978 Louisiana Tech Bulldogs football team was an American football team that represented Louisiana Tech University as a member of the Southland Conference during the 1978 NCAA Division I-A football season. In their twelfth year under head coach Maxie Lambright, the team compiled a 6–5 record and as Southland Conference co-champion.

== Schedule ==
Date	Opponent	Site	Result	Attendance	Source
September 16	Chattanooga*	Joe Aillet Stadium; Ruston, LA	L 7–12	14,212	
September 23	at UT Arlington	Cravens Field; Arlington, TX	W 28–21	7,025	
September 30	McNeese State	Joe Aillet Stadium; Ruston, LA	W 34–20	18,200	
October 7	at Southwestern Louisiana	Cajun Field; Lafayette, LA (rivalry)	L 6–24	21,050	
October 14	Ball State*	Joe Aillet Stadium; Ruston, LA	W 17–7	12,526	
October 21	vs. Northwestern State*	State Fair Stadium; Shreveport, LA (rivalry)	W 45–20	21,000	
October 28	vs. North Texas State*	State Fair Stadium; Shreveport, LA	L 14–16	6,510	
November 4	Lamar	Joe Aillet Stadium; Ruston, LA	W 40–3	10,000	
November 11	Arkansas State	Joe Aillet Stadium; Ruston, LA	W 24–10	15,200	
November 18	at Northeast Louisiana*	Malone Stadium; Monroe, LA (rivalry)	L 0–18	17,000	
December 16	vs. East Carolina*	State Fair Stadium; Shreveport, LA (Independence Bowl)	L 13–35	31,054	
*Non-conference game
