= 1978 Southwestern Louisiana Ragin' Cajuns football team =

American college football season

1978 Southwestern Louisiana Ragin' Cajuns football
- Conference: Southland Conference
- Record: 3–8 (2–3 Southland)
- Head coach: Augie Tammariello (5th season)
- Home stadium: Cajun Field

1978 Southland Conference football standings
	Conf.					Overall
Team	W		L		T	W		L		T
Louisiana Tech +	4	–	1	–	0	6	–	5	–	0
Arkansas State +	4	–	1	–	0	7	–	4	–	0
UT Arlington	3	–	2	–	0	5	–	6	–	0
McNeese State	2	–	3	–	0	7	–	4	–	0
Southwestern Louisiana	2	–	3	–	0	3	–	8	–	0
Lamar	0	–	5	–	0	2	–	8	–	1
+ – Conference co-champions

The 1978 Southwestern Louisiana Ragin' Cajuns football team was an American football team that represented the University of Southwestern Louisiana (now known as the University of Louisiana at Lafayette) in the Southland Conference during the 1978 NCAA Division I-A football season. In their fifth year under head coach Augie Tammariello, the team compiled a 3–8 record.

== Schedule ==
Date	Opponent	Site	Result	Attendance	Source
September 9	Long Beach State*	Cajun Field; Lafayette, LA	L 0–10	15,208	
September 16	at Tulsa*	Skelly Stadium; Tulsa, OK	L 3–10	21,500	
September 23	East Carolina*	Cajun Field; Lafayette, LA	L 9–38	14,103	
September 30	Lamar	Cajun Field; Lafayette, LA	W 23–16		
October 7	Louisiana Tech	Cajun Field; Lafayette, LA	W 24–6	21,050	
October 14	at UT Arlington	Cravens Field; Arlington, TX	L 3–24	5,450	
October 28	Cincinnati*	Cajun Field; Lafayette, LA	L 13–38		
November 4	Arkansas State	Cajun Field; Lafayette, LA	L 6–16	23,106	
November 11	at Northwestern State*	Harry Turpin Stadium; Natchitoches, LA	W 19–17		
November 18	Southern Illinois*	Cajun Field; Lafayette, LA	L 9–10	11,150	
November 25	at McNeese State	Cowboy Stadium; Lake Charles, LA	L 18–44		
*Non-conference game
