= 1978 Long Beach State 49ers football team =

American college football season

1978 Long Beach State 49ers football
- Conference: Pacific Coast Athletic Association
- Record: 5–6 (1–4 PCAA)
- Head coach: Dave Currey (2nd season)
- Offensive coordinator: Ron McBride (2nd season)
- Home stadium: Anaheim Stadium

1978 Pacific Coast Athletic Association football standings
	Conf.					Overall
Team	W		L		T	W		L		T
Utah State +	4	–	1	–	0	7	–	4	–	0
San Jose State +	4	–	1	–	0	7	–	5	–	0
Pacific (CA)	3	–	2	–	0	4	–	8	–	0
Cal State Fullerton	2	–	2	–	0	5	–	7	–	0
Long Beach State	1	–	4	–	0	5	–	6	–	0
Fresno State	1	–	4	–	0	3	–	8	–	0
+ – Conference co-champions; Utah State's game against Wyoming counted in the conference standings.

The 1978 Long Beach State 49ers football team represented California State University, Long Beach (Note: The official name of Long Beach State has been California State University, Long Beach since 1972. However, it is still commonly known as Long Beach State.) during the 1978 NCAA Division I-A football season.

Cal State Long Beach competed in the Pacific Coast Athletic Association. (Note: The Big West Conference was known as the Pacific Coast Athletic Association from its founding in 1969 through 1987.) The team was led by second year head coach Dave Currey, and played home games at Anaheim Stadium in Anaheim, California. They finished the season with a record of five wins, six losses (5–6, 1–4 PCAA).

== Schedule ==
Date	Time	Opponent	Site	Result	Attendance	Source
September 9	5:00 pm	at Southwestern Louisiana*	Cajun Field; Lafayette, LA	W 10–0	15,208	
September 16	6:30 pm	at Boise State*	Bronco Stadium; Boise, ID	L 13–19	19,435	
September 30	7:30 pm	at Pacific (CA)	Pacific Memorial Stadium; Stockton, CA	L 0–14	8,932	
October 7	7:30 pm	Northern Illinois*	Anaheim Stadium; Anaheim, CA	W 24–19	6,225	
October 14	12:30 pm	at Utah State	Romney Stadium; Logan, UT	W 33–17	15,800	
October 21	7:30 pm	Cal State Fullerton	Anaheim Stadium; Anaheim, CA	L 9–34	8,435	
October 28	7:30 pm	San Diego State*	Anaheim Stadium; Anaheim, CA	W 27–25	11,216	
November 4	7:00 pm	at Fresno State	Ratcliffe Stadium; Fresno, CA	L 41–42	8,963	
November 17	7:30 pm	Drake*	Anaheim Stadium; Anaheim, CA	W 25–0	4,772	
November 25	5:30 pm	at Lamar*	Cardinal Stadium; Beaumont, TX	L 31–36	1,000	
December 2	1:30 pm	at San Jose State	Spartan Stadium; San Jose, CA	L 6–24	10,115	
*Non-conference game; All times are in Pacific time

== Team players in the NFL ==
No Long Beach State 49ers were selected in the 1979 NFL draft.

The following finished their college career in 1978, were not drafted, but played in the NFL.

Player	Position	First NFL team
Sid Justin	Defensive back	1979 Los Angeles Rams
