= 1978 Ball State Cardinals football team =

American college football season

1978 Ball State Cardinals football

MAC champion
- Conference: Mid-American Conference
- Record: 10–1 (8–0 MAC)
- Head coach: Dwight Wallace (1st season)
- Captains: Ken Kremer; Rick Morrison; Bill Stahl
- Home stadium: Ball State Stadium

1978 Mid-American Conference football standings
	Conf.					Overall
Team	W		L		T	W		L		T
Ball State $	8	–	0	–	0	10	–	1	–	0
Central Michigan	8	–	1	–	0	9	–	2	–	0
Miami (OH)	5	–	2	–	0	8	–	2	–	1
Western Michigan	5	–	4	–	0	7	–	4	–	0
Bowling Green	3	–	5	–	0	4	–	7	–	0
Ohio	3	–	5	–	0	3	–	8	–	0
Northern Illinois	2	–	4	–	0	5	–	6	–	0
Kent State	2	–	6	–	0	4	–	7	–	0
Toledo	2	–	7	–	0	2	–	9	–	0
Eastern Michigan	1	–	5	–	0	3	–	7	–	0
$ – Conference champion

The 1978 Ball State Cardinals football team was an American football team that represented Ball State University in the Mid-American Conference (MAC) during the 1978 NCAA Division I-A football season. In its first season under head coach Dwight Wallace, the team compiled a 10–1 record (8–0 against conference opponents) and won the MAC championship. Ball state did not have another 10-win season until 2008, when they started the season at 12–0 before losing their conference championship game and their bowl game. The team played its home games at Ball State Stadium in Muncie, Indiana.

The team's statistical leaders included Dave Wilson with 1,037 passing yards, Archie Currin with 735 rushing yards, Ray Hinton with 417 receiving yards, and Mark O'Connell with 60 points scored. Brady Hoke was a member of the team.

== Schedule ==
Date	Opponent	Site	Result	Attendance	Source
September 9	Miami (OH)	Ball State Stadium; Muncie, IN	W 38–14	17,875	
September 16	Kent State	Ball State Stadium; Muncie, IN	W 27–3	15,225	
September 23	Toledo	Ball State Stadium; Muncie, IN	W 20–0	15,630	
September 30	at Central Michigan	Perry Shorts Stadium; Mount Pleasant, MI	W 27–0	20,216	
October 7	Indiana State*	Ball State Stadium; Muncie, IN (Blue Key Victory Bell)	W 7–0	18,323	
October 14	at Louisiana Tech*	Joe Aillet Stadium; Ruston, LA	L 7–17	12,526	
October 21	at Illinois State*	Hancock Stadium; Normal, IL	W 14–7	8,500	
October 28	at Eastern Michigan	Rynearson Stadium; Ypsilanti, MI	W 21–0	5,505	
November 4	at Bowling Green	Doyt Perry Stadium; Bowling Green, OH	W 39–14	15,069	
November 11	Western Michigan	Ball State Stadium; Muncie, IN	W 20–14	17,110	
November 18	at Northern Illinois	Huskie Stadium; DeKalb, IL (rivalry)	W 31–13	8,041	
*Non-conference game
