= 1978 Dartmouth Big Green football team =

American college football season

1978 Dartmouth Big Green football

Ivy League champion
- Conference: Ivy League
- Record: 6–3 (6–1 Ivy)
- Head coach: Joe Yukica (1st season)
- Captains: Joseph Nastri; Buddy Teevens
- Home stadium: Memorial Field

1978 Ivy League football standings
| | Conf. | | | | | Overall |
| Team | W | | L | | T | W | | L | | T |
|---|---|---|---|---|---|---|---|---|---|---|
| Dartmouth $ | 6 | – | 1 | – | 0 | 6 | – | 3 | – | 0 |
| Brown | 5 | – | 2 | – | 0 | 6 | – | 3 | – | 0 |
| Yale | 4 | – | 1 | – | 2 | 5 | – | 2 | – | 2 |
| Cornell | 3 | – | 3 | – | 1 | 5 | – | 3 | – | 1 |
| Harvard | 2 | – | 4 | – | 1 | 4 | – | 4 | – | 1 |
| Columbia | 2 | – | 4 | – | 1 | 3 | – | 5 | – | 1 |
| Princeton | 1 | – | 4 | – | 2 | 2 | – | 5 | – | 2 |
| Penn | 1 | – | 5 | – | 1 | 2 | – | 6 | – | 1 |
$ – Conference champion

The 1978 Dartmouth Big Green football team was an American football team that represented Dartmouth College during the 1978 NCAA Division I-A football season. The Big Green won the Ivy League for their fifth conference title of the 1970s.

In its first season under head coach Joe Yukica, the team compiled a 6–3 record and outscored opponents 187 to 159. Eugene “Buddy” Teevens and Joseph Nastri were the team captains.

The Big Green's 6–1 conference was the best in the Ivy League standings. Dartmouth outscored Ivy opponents 170 to 104.

Dartmouth played its home games at Memorial Field on the college campus in Hanover, New Hampshire.

== Schedule ==
| Date | Opponent | Site | Result | Attendance | Source |
|---|---|---|---|---|---|
| September 23 | Penn | Memorial Field; Hanover, NH | W 31–21 | 10,100 | |
| September 30 | at Holy Cross* | Fitton Field; Worcester, MA | L 0–35 | 22,024 | |
| October 7 | Boston University* | Memorial Field; Hanover, NH | L 17–20 | 9,750 | |
| October 14 | Yale | Memorial Field; Hanover, NH | W 10–3 | 17,500 | |
| October 21 | at Harvard | Harvard Stadium; Boston, MA (rivalry) | L 19–24 | 28,500 | |
| October 28 | at Cornell | Schoellkopf Field; Ithaca, NY (rivalry) | W 14–7 | 15,063 | |
| November 4 | Columbia | Memorial Field; Hanover, NH | W 37–7 | 9,500 | |
| November 11 | at Brown | Brown Stadium; Providence, RI | W 31–21 | 17,200 | |
| November 18 | at Princeton | Palmer Stadium; Princeton, NJ | W 28–21 | 19,565 | |
*Non-conference game
