= 1978 New Mexico State Aggies football team =

American college football season

1978 New Mexico State Aggies football

MVC champion
- Conference: Missouri Valley Conference
- Record: 6–5 (5–1 MVC)
- Head coach: Gil Krueger (1st season)
- Home stadium: Aggie Memorial Stadium

1978 Missouri Valley Conference football standings
	Conf.					Overall
Team	W		L		T	W		L		T
New Mexico State $	5	–	1	–	0	6	–	5	–	0
Tulsa	4	–	1	–	0	9	–	2	–	0
Southern Illinois	3	–	2	–	0	7	–	4	–	0
Drake	3	–	3	–	0	4	–	7	–	0
Indiana State	2	–	3	–	0	3	–	8	–	0
Wichita State	2	–	4	–	0	4	–	7	–	0
West Texas State	1	–	5	–	0	3	–	8	–	0
$ – Conference champion

The 1978 New Mexico State Aggies football team was an American football team that represented New Mexico State University in the Missouri Valley Conference (MVC) during the 1978 NCAA Division I-A football season. In their first year under head coach Gil Krueger, the Aggies compiled a 6–5 record and finished as MVC champions. The team played its home games at Aggie Memorial Stadium in Las Cruces, New Mexico.

== Schedule ==
Date	Opponent	Site	Result	Attendance	Source
September 9	at Indiana State	Memorial Stadium; Terre Haute, IN	W 14–9	8,514	
September 16	UTEP*	Aggie Memorial Stadium; Las Cruces, NM (rivalry)	W 35–32	30,193	
September 23	North Texas State*	Aggie Memorial Stadium; Las Cruces, NM	L 21–22	13,196	
September 30	at Southern Illinois	McAndrew Stadium; Carbondale, IL	L 39–43	14,112	
October 7	UT Arlington*	Aggie Memorial Stadium; Las Cruces, NM	L 17–28	13,852	
October 14	Tulsa	Aggie Memorial Stadium; Las Cruces, NM	W 23–20	12,337	
October 21	at New Mexico*	University Stadium; Albuquerque, NM (rivalry)	L 20–35	17,056	
October 28	at Wichita State	Cessna Stadium; Wichita, KS	W 31–21	13,168	
November 4	Drake	Aggie Memorial Stadium; Las Cruces, NM	W 21–20	18,578	
November 11	at Hawaii*	Aloha Stadium; Honolulu, HI	L 20–35	25,193	
November 25	at West Texas State	Kimbrough Memorial Stadium; Canyon, TX	W 33–31		
*Non-conference game
