= 1978 Indiana State Sycamores football team =

American college football season

1978 Indiana State Sycamores football
- Conference: Missouri Valley Conference
- Record: 3–8 (2–3 MVC)
- Head coach: Dick Jamieson (1st season)
- Defensive coordinator: Dennis Raetz (1st season)
- Home stadium: Memorial Stadium

1978 Missouri Valley Conference football standings
	Conf.					Overall
Team	W		L		T	W		L		T
New Mexico State $	5	–	1	–	0	6	–	5	–	0
Tulsa	4	–	1	–	0	9	–	2	–	0
Southern Illinois	3	–	2	–	0	7	–	4	–	0
Drake	3	–	3	–	0	4	–	7	–	0
Indiana State	2	–	3	–	0	3	–	8	–	0
Wichita State	2	–	4	–	0	4	–	7	–	0
West Texas State	1	–	5	–	0	3	–	8	–	0
$ – Conference champion

The 1978 Indiana State Sycamores football team was an American football team that represented Indiana State University as a member of the Missouri Valley Conference (MVC) during the 1978 NCAA Division I-A football season. In their first year under head coach Dick Jamieson, the team compiled an overall record of 3–8 record with a mark of 2–3 in conference play, placing fifth in the MVC.

== Schedule ==
Date	Opponent	Site	Result	Attendance	Source
September 9	New Mexico State	Memorial Stadium; Terre Haute, IN	L 9–14	8,514	
September 16	Western Illinois*	Memorial Stadium; Terre Haute, IN	W 31–20		
September 23	at Eastern Michigan*	Rynearson Stadium; Ypsilanti, MI	L 8–27		
September 30	at Louisville*	Fairgrounds Stadium; Louisville, KY	L 12–31	16,931	
October 7	at Ball State*	Ball State Stadium; Muncie, IN (rivalry)	L 0–7	18,323	
October 14	Drake	Memorial Stadium; Terre Haute, IN	W 13–0		
October 21	West Texas State	Memorial Stadium; Terre Haute, IN	L 7–36		
October 28	at Northeast Louisiana*	Malone Stadium; Monroe, LA	L 0–14		
November 4	Southern Illinois	Memorial Stadium; Terre Haute, IN	L 7–28	4,785	
November 11	at Illinois State*	Hancock Stadium; Normal, IL	L 14–27	4,500	
November 18	Wichita State	Memorial Stadium; Terre Haute, IN	W 42–18		
*Non-conference game
