= 1978 Arkansas State Indians football team =

American college football season

1978 Arkansas State Indians football

Southland co-champion
- Conference: Southland Conference
- Record: 7–4 (4–1 Southland)
- Head coach: Bill Davidson (8th season)
- Home stadium: Indian Stadium; War Memorial Stadium

1978 Southland Conference football standings
	Conf.					Overall
Team	W		L		T	W		L		T
Louisiana Tech +	4	–	1	–	0	6	–	5	–	0
Arkansas State +	4	–	1	–	0	7	–	4	–	0
UT Arlington	3	–	2	–	0	5	–	6	–	0
McNeese State	2	–	3	–	0	7	–	4	–	0
Southwestern Louisiana	2	–	3	–	0	3	–	8	–	0
Lamar	0	–	5	–	0	2	–	8	–	1
+ – Conference co-champions

The 1978 Arkansas State Indians football team represented Arkansas State University as a member of the Southland Conference during the 1978 NCAA Division I-A football season. Led by eighth-year head coach Bill Davidson, the Indians compiled an overall record of 7–4 with a mark of 4–1 in conference, sharing the Southland title with Louisiana Tech.

== Schedule ==
Date	Opponent	Site	Result	Attendance	Source
September 2	at Tulsa*	Skelly Stadium; Tulsa, OK	L 20–21	20,900	
September 9	Southern Miss*	War Memorial Stadium; Little Rock, AR	L 6–21	16,848	
September 16	at Northeast Louisiana*	Malone Stadium; Monroe, LA	L 13–21		
September 23	Drake*	Indian Stadium; Jonesboro, AR	W 10–0		
October 7	Northwestern State*	Indian Stadium; Jonesboro, AR	W 23–14		
October 14	at Southern Illinois*	McAndrew Stadium; Carbondale, IL	W 26–24	15,446	
October 21	McNeese State	Indian Stadium; Jonesboro, AR	W 6–3		
October 28	at UT Arlington	Cravens Field; Arlington, TX	W 27–7	7,805	
November 4	at Southwestern Louisiana	Cajun Field; Lafayette, LA	W 16–6	23,106	
November 11	at Louisiana Tech	Joe Aillet Stadium; Ruston, LA	L 10–24	15,200	
November 18	Lamar^{†}	Indian Stadium; Jonesboro, AR	W 6–3	8,679	
*Non-conference game; ^{†}Homecoming
