= 1978 San Jose State Spartans football team =

American college football season

1978 San Jose State Spartans football

PCAA co-champion
- Conference: Pacific Coast Athletic Association
- Record: 7–5 (4–1 PCAA)
- Head coach: Lynn Stiles (3rd season)
- Home stadium: Spartan Stadium

1978 Pacific Coast Athletic Association football standings
| | Conf. | | | | | Overall |
| Team | W | | L | | T | W | | L | | T |
|---|---|---|---|---|---|---|---|---|---|---|
| Utah State + | 4 | – | 1 | – | 0 | 7 | – | 4 | – | 0 |
| San Jose State + | 4 | – | 1 | – | 0 | 7 | – | 5 | – | 0 |
| Pacific (CA) | 3 | – | 2 | – | 0 | 4 | – | 8 | – | 0 |
| Cal State Fullerton | 2 | – | 2 | – | 0 | 5 | – | 7 | – | 0 |
| Long Beach State | 1 | – | 4 | – | 0 | 5 | – | 6 | – | 0 |
| Fresno State | 1 | – | 4 | – | 0 | 3 | – | 8 | – | 0 |
+ – Conference co-champions; Utah State's game against Wyoming counted in the conference standings.

The 1978 San Jose State Spartans football team represented San Jose State University during the 1978 NCAA Division I-A football season as a member of the Pacific Coast Athletic Association. (Note: The Big West Conference was known as the Pacific Coast Athletic Association from its founding in 1969 through 1987.) The team was led by third year head coach Lynn Stiles. They played home games at Spartan Stadium in San Jose, California. The Spartans finished the season as champions of the PCAA for the third time in four years, with a record of seven wins and five losses (7–5, 4–1 PCAA).

== Schedule ==
| Date | Opponent | Site | Result | Attendance | Source |
|---|---|---|---|---|---|
| September 9 | Idaho* | Spartan Stadium; San Jose, CA | W 31–14 | 10,011 | |
| September 16 | at Stanford* | Stanford Stadium; Stanford, CA (rivalry) | L 9–38 | 42,500 | |
| September 23 | at No. 19 Colorado* | Folsom Field; Boulder, CO | L 7–22 | 44,868 | |
| September 30 | Santa Clara*^{†} | Spartan Stadium; San Jose, CA | W 17–7 | 16,626 | |
| October 7 | at Hawaii* | Aloha Stadium; Halawa, HI (rivalry) | L 11–25 | 36,049 | |
| October 14 | at Boise State* | Bronco Stadium; Boise, ID | L 15–30 | 18,112 | |
| October 21 | Fresno State | Spartan Stadium; San Jose, CA (rivalry) | W 26–16 | 11,410 | |
| October 28 | at Utah State | Romney Stadium; Logan, UT | L 21–31 | 18,226 | |
| November 4 | Cal State Fullerton | Spartan Stadium; San Jose, CA | W 30–21 | 9,183 | |
| November 11 | at Pacific (CA) | Pacific Memorial Stadium; Stockton, CA (Victory Bell) | W 33–31 | 14,000 | |
| November 18 | Montana* | Spartan Stadium; San Jose, CA | W 35–7 | | |
| December 2 | Long Beach State | Spartan Stadium; San Jose, CA | W 24–6 | 10,115 | |
*Non-conference game; ^{†}Homecoming; Rankings from AP Poll released prior to the game

== Team players in the NFL ==
The following were selected in the 1979 NFL draft.

| Player | Position | Round | Overall | NFL team |
| Frank Manumaleuga | Linebacker | 4 | 85 | Kansas City Chiefs |

The following finished their San Jose State career in 1978, were not drafted, but played in the NFL.

| Player | Position | First NFL team |
| M. L. Carter | Defensive back | 1979 Kansas City Chiefs |
