= 1978 NCAA Division I-A football season =

American college football season

1978 NCAA Division I-A season
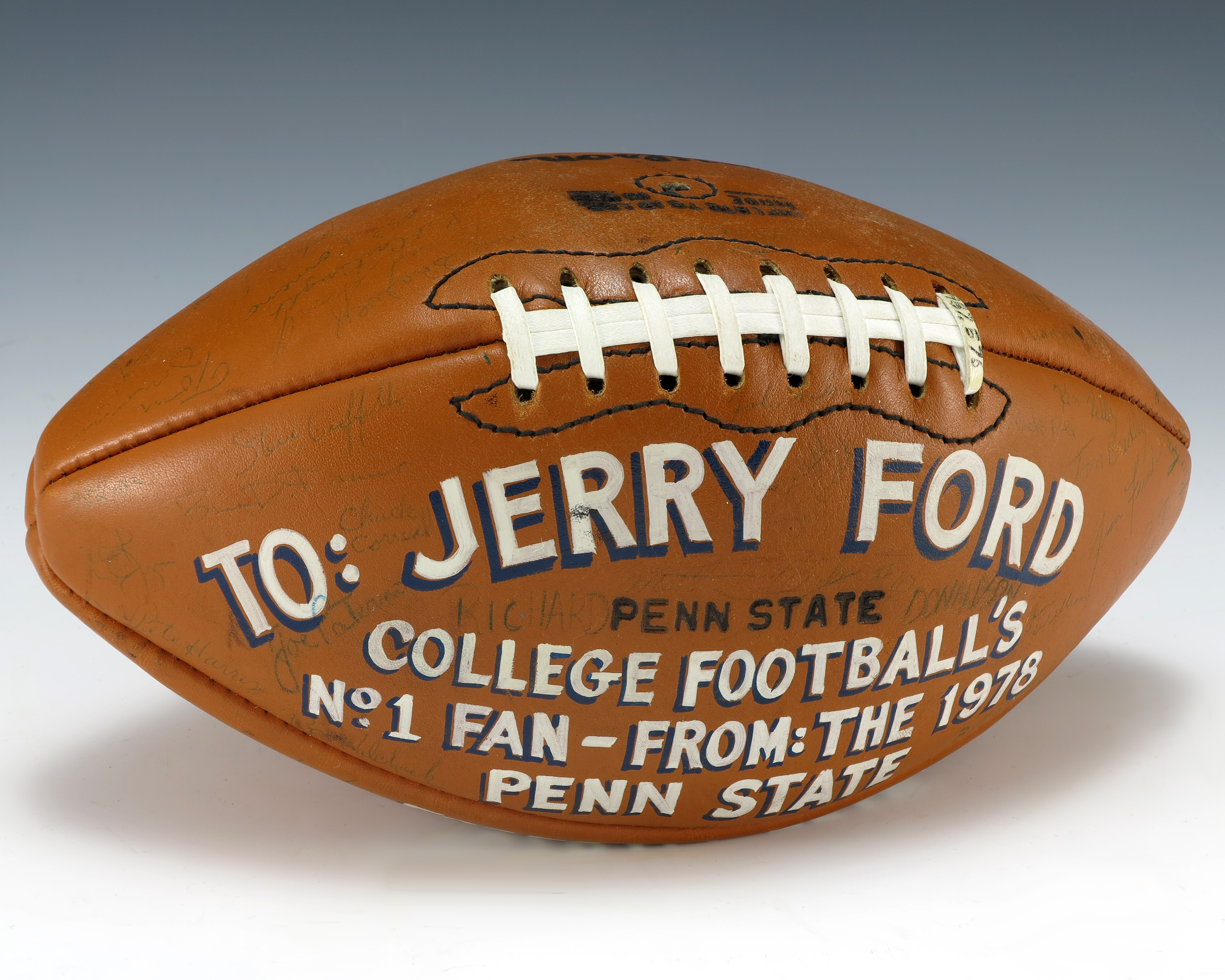
- Number of teams: 139
- Duration: September 1, 1978 – January 1, 1979
- Preseason AP No. 1: Alabama

Postseason
- Duration: December 16, 1978 – January 1, 1979
- Bowl games: 15
- AP Poll No. 1: Alabama
- Coaches Poll No. 1: USC
- Heisman Trophy: Oklahoma running back Billy Sims
- Champion(s): Alabama (AP, FWAA, NFF); USC (Coaches)

Division I-A football seasons
- «1977 1979 →

The 1978 NCAA Division I-A football season was the first season of Division I-A college football. Division I-A was created in January 1978 when Division I was subdivided into Division I-A and I-AA for football only. It was anticipated that 65 Division I football schools would transition to Division I-AA. Instead, just eight programs (seven teams from the Southwestern Athletic Conference, which had just joined Division I a year before, plus independent Northwestern State) voluntarily opted for Division I-AA for the 1978 season, where they joined 35 schools that had reclassified from Division II. One school, UNLV, moved from Division II to I-A, bringing the total number of I-A institutions to 139 for the 1978 season.

The Division I-A season came down to a rare top-two post-season meeting as No. 1 Penn State and No. 2 Alabama met in the Sugar Bowl in New Orleans on New Year's Day. The game is most remembered for Alabama's goal line stand with four minutes left in the game; on fourth down and a foot, Alabama managed to keep Penn State out of the end zone and went on to win, 14–7. Keith Jackson, who did the play-by-play for ABC, called it the greatest game he'd ever seen; 76,824 packed the Louisiana Superdome, which was tremendously loud.

Alabama's only loss that year was 24–14 in Birmingham to USC in September. Both schools claim this year as a national title year: Alabama claimed the national title because it defeated top-ranked Penn State on the field. USC claimed the title because it defeated Alabama in the regular season and also finished with only one loss. The AP Poll and most other voting outlets (including the Football Writers Association of America and the National Football Foundation) crowned Alabama as national champion, while the UPI Coaches' Poll selected USC.

== Rules changes ==
- Unsuccessful field goals are returned to the previous line of scrimmage. Previously they were placed at the 20-yard line. Unsuccessful attempts where the previous line of scrimmage was inside the 20 are placed at the 20.
- Balls may not be altered and new or nearly new balls are to be used.
- Receivers knocked out of bounds by a defender can return and catch a legal forward pass.
- Intentional grounding is defined as a pass thrown with the intent of avoiding loss of yardage that lands where no eligible receivers are located.
- Players whose jerseys are torn are required to leave the field for one play to change or a time-out will be charged to his team.
- The penalty for an ineligible receiver touched by a forward pass is reduced from 10 yards and loss of down to 5 yards and loss of down.
- Delay of game (5 yards) penalties can be assessed against the defense when crowd noise prevents the offense from running its plays.

== Conference and program changes ==
=== New conferences ===
- After adding Arizona and Arizona State from the Western Athletic Conference (WAC), the Pacific-8 Conference was renamed the Pacific-10 Conference.

=== Membership changes ===
School	1977 Conference	1978 Conference
Arizona Wildcats	WAC	Pacific-10
Arizona State Sun Devils	WAC	Pacific-10
Indiana State Sycamores	D-I Independent	Missouri Valley
San Diego State Aztecs	PCAA (Big West)	WAC
UNLV Rebels	D-II Independent	I-A Independent
Utah State Aggies	D-I Independent	PCAA (Big West)

=== Program changes ===
- University of Oregon Webfoots officially changed their nickname to the now-ubiquitous Ducks.

== September ==
The pre-season ranking of the top five teams was No. 1 Alabama, No. 2 Arkansas, No. 3 Penn State, No. 4 Oklahoma, and No. 5 Notre Dame.

On September 2, No. 1 Alabama avenged its only loss from the prior season when they topped No. 10 Nebraska, 20–3. No. 2 Arkansas would not start its season for another two weeks. No. 3 Penn State struggled against Temple 10–7. No. 4 Oklahoma was idle, as was No. 5 Notre Dame. With relatively few games played this week, the AP did not issue a new poll.

On September 9, No. 1 Alabama and No. 2 Arkansas were not scheduled, while No. 3 Penn State beat Rutgers, 26–10. No. 4 Oklahoma opened its season with a 35–29 win at Stanford, but No. 5 Notre Dame was stunned at Missouri, 3–0. No. 6 Michigan, which had yet to begin its season, replaced Notre Dame in the top five: No. 1 Alabama, No. 2 Arkansas, No. 3 Oklahoma, No. 4 Michigan, and No. 5 Penn State.

September 16 saw No. 1 Alabama win at No. 11 Missouri, 38–20, while No. 2 Arkansas opened its season with a 48–17 win over Vanderbilt. No. 3 Oklahoma walloped West Virginia 52–10, and No. 4 Michigan started its campaign with a 31–0 shutout of Illinois. No. 5 Penn State blanked No. 6 Ohio State 19–0 and moved up to tie Oklahoma in the next poll: No. 1 Alabama, No. 2 Arkansas, No. 3 Penn State, No. 3 Oklahoma, and No. 5 Michigan.

On September 23, No. 1 Alabama lost at Birmingham to No. 7 USC, 24–14. No. 2 Arkansas struggled against Oklahoma State 19–7, and No. 3 Penn State also had a difficult time with SMU but won 26–21. No. 3 Oklahoma had a much more dominant performance with a 66–7 victory over Rice, earning them the top spot in the next poll. No. 5 Michigan won at No. 14 Notre Dame, 28–14. The new poll was No. 1 Oklahoma, No. 2 Arkansas, No. 3 USC, No. 4 Michigan, and No. 5 Penn State.

On September 30, new No. 1 Oklahoma beat No. 14 Missouri 45–23. No. 2 Arkansas was unimpressive in a 21–13 win over Tulsa, but No. 3 USC thumped Michigan State 30–9, No. 4 Michigan beat Duke 52–0, and No. 5 Penn State crushed TCU 58–0. The next poll featured No. 1 Oklahoma, No. 2 USC, No. 3 Michigan, No. 4 Arkansas, and No. 5 Penn State.

== October ==
On October 7, No. 1 Oklahoma solidified its ranking with a 31–10 win over No. 6 Texas in Dallas. No. 2 USC was idle, No. 3 Michigan struggled in beating Arizona 21–17, No. 4 Arkansas beat TCU 42–3, and No. 5 Penn State avenged its only loss from 1977 in shutting out Kentucky, 30–0. The latter two teams were tied in the next poll: No. 1 Oklahoma, No. 2 USC, No. 3 Penn State, No. 3 Arkansas, and No. 5 Michigan.

October 14 was a day of surprises. No. 1 Oklahoma escaped with a 17–16 win over Kansas, No. 2 USC lost to Arizona State in Tempe 20–7, and No. 5 Michigan lost to Michigan State, 24–15. No. 3 Penn State and No. 4 Arkansas were idle. Moving up were No. 7 Alabama, which beat Florida 23–12, and No. 8 Nebraska, which defeated Kansas State 48–14. The next poll featured No. 1 Oklahoma, No. 2 Penn State, No. 3 Arkansas, No. 4 Alabama, and No. 5 Nebraska.

October 21 saw No. 3 Arkansas lose to No. 8 Texas 28–21. This week the other top-ranked teams were more successful, as No. 1 Oklahoma beat Iowa State 34–6, No. 2 Penn State won over Syracuse 45–14, No. 4 Alabama beat Tennessee 30–13, and No. 5 Nebraska won at Colorado 52–14. No. 6 Maryland jumped into the top five with a 39–0 win over Wake Forest: No. 1 Oklahoma, No. 2 Penn State, No. 3 Alabama, No. 4 Nebraska, and No. 5 Maryland.

On October 28, No. 1 Oklahoma beat Kansas State 56–19, No. 2 Penn State beat West Virginia 49–21, No. 3 Alabama beat Virginia Tech 35–0, No. 4 Nebraska beat Oklahoma State 22–14, and No. 5 Maryland got ready for their upcoming showdown with Penn State by thumping Duke 27–0. The top five remained the same.

== November ==
On November 4, No. 1 Oklahoma beat Colorado 28–7 to improve its record to 9−0. In a matchup of the only other undefeated teams, No. 2 Penn State stymied No. 5 Maryland 27–3. No. 3 Alabama topped Mississippi State 35–14, and No. 4 Nebraska beat Kansas 63–21. No. 6 USC moved up after a 13–7 win at Stanford: No. 1 Oklahoma, No. 2 Penn State, No. 3 Alabama, No. 4 Nebraska, and No. 5 USC.

November 11 saw No. 1 Oklahoma lose to No. 4 Nebraska 17–14, allowing the Cornhuskers to clinch at least a share of the Big Eight title. No. 2 Penn State claimed the top spot with a 19–10 win over North Carolina State. No. 3 Alabama rolled along with a 31–10 win at No. 10 LSU. No. 5 USC beat No. 19 Washington 28–10. The new poll featured No. 1 Penn State, No. 2 Nebraska, No. 3 Alabama, No. 4 Oklahoma, and No. 5 USC.

On November 18, No. 1 Penn State and No. 3 Alabama were idle. No. 2 Nebraska was knocked off at home by Missouri 35–31 and fell out of the top five, while No. 4 Oklahoma won its final game over Oklahoma State 62–7. This left the Cornhuskers and Sooners in a tie atop the Big Eight, but Nebraska's head-to-head victory earned them a spot in the Orange Bowl. In the showdown to decide the Pac-10 title and Rose Bowl berth, No. 5 USC stopped No. 14 UCLA by a score of 17–10. No. 6 Houston, which was idle this week but stood atop the SWC standings after upset victories over Arkansas and Texas, moved into the top five: No. 1 Penn State, No. 2 Alabama, No. 3 USC, No. 4 Oklahoma, and No. 5 Houston.

On November 24, No. 1 Penn State wrapped up its undefeated regular season with a 17–10 win over their rival, No. 15 Pittsburgh. No. 2 Alabama had one more week off before its game with rival Auburn. No. 3 USC needed a controversial call (an apparent fumble was ruled an incomplete pass thus keeping the final drive alive) and last second field goal to beat No. 8 Notre Dame 27–25. No. 5 Houston was upset by Texas Tech 22–21, but the Cougars still clinched the SWC title and a Cotton Bowl berth when the other contender, No. 9 Texas, also lost. For once, Michigan and Ohio State were not the only contenders for the Big Ten title, as No. 14 Michigan State stood in a three-way tie with the two traditional powerhouses; the Spartans even held the head-to-head advantage over Michigan. However, Michigan State was banned from the postseason due to recruiting violations, meaning that the Michigan-Ohio State game would yet again determine the conference's representative in the Rose Bowl. In the final battle of "The Ten Year War", the No. 6-ranked Wolverines clinched a trip to Pasadena with a 14–3 win over the No. 16 Buckeyes. The next poll featured No. 1 Penn State, No. 2 Alabama, No. 3 USC, No. 4 Oklahoma, and No. 5 Michigan.

== December ==
On December 2, No. 2 Alabama needed a victory in the Iron Bowl to clinch the SEC title and a Sugar Bowl berth, which would go to No. 11 Georgia (currently half a game behind them in conference play) if they lost. The Crimson Tide came through with a 34–16 win over rival Auburn, and the top five remained unchanged from the previous week.

No. 1 Penn State accepted the Sugar Bowl bid to set up a 1 vs. 2 matchup with Alabama. No. 3 USC and No. 5 Michigan would square off in a Rose Bowl battle of one-loss teams. The Orange Bowl normally pitted the Big Eight champion against an independent team or one from another conference, but this year the organizers set up a rematch between No. 6 Nebraska and No. 4 Oklahoma (which lost the Big Eight title to the Cornhuskers in a close game, but had a better overall record and ranking). The Cotton Bowl rounded out the major games with a matchup between No. 9 Houston and No. 10 Notre Dame. No. 7 Clemson was passed over by the New Year's bowls despite a 10−1 record and the ACC championship, but their Gator Bowl contest with No. 20 Ohio State turned out to be much more significant in hindsight. It was near the end of that game when legendary Ohio State coach Woody Hayes punched Clemson linebacker Charlie Bauman after his game clinching interception, leading to Hayes' dismissal as Ohio State coach.

== Conference standings ==
1978 Atlantic Coast Conference football standings
	Conf.					Overall
Team	W		L		T	W		L		T
No. 6 Clemson $	6	–	0	–	0	11	–	1	–	0
No. 20 Maryland	5	–	1	–	0	9	–	3	–	0
No. 18 NC State	4	–	2	–	0	9	–	3	–	0
North Carolina	3	–	3	–	0	5	–	6	–	0
Duke	2	–	4	–	0	4	–	7	–	0
Wake Forest	1	–	5	–	0	1	–	10	–	0
Virginia	0	–	6	–	0	2	–	9	–	0
$ – Conference champion; Rankings from AP Poll

1978 Big Eight Conference football standings
	Conf.					Overall
Team	W		L		T	W		L		T
No. 3 Oklahoma +	6	–	1	–	0	11	–	1	–	0
No. 8 Nebraska +	6	–	1	–	0	9	–	3	–	0
No. 15 Missouri	4	–	3	–	0	8	–	4	–	0
Iowa State	4	–	3	–	0	8	–	4	–	0
Kansas State	3	–	4	–	0	4	–	7	–	0
Oklahoma State	3	–	4	–	0	3	–	8	–	0
Colorado	2	–	5	–	0	6	–	5	–	0
Kansas	0	–	7	–	0	1	–	10	–	0
+ – Conference co-champions; Rankings from AP Poll

1978 Big Ten Conference football standings
	Conf.					Overall
Team	W		L		T	W		L		T
No. 5 Michigan +	7	–	1	–	0	10	–	2	–	0
No. 12 Michigan State +	7	–	1	–	0	8	–	3	–	0
No. 13 Purdue	6	–	1	–	1	9	–	2	–	1
Ohio State	6	–	2	–	0	7	–	4	–	1
Minnesota	4	–	4	–	0	5	–	6	–	0
Wisconsin	3	–	4	–	2	5	–	4	–	2
Indiana	3	–	5	–	0	4	–	7	–	0
Iowa	2	–	6	–	0	2	–	9	–	0
Illinois	0	–	6	–	2	1	–	8	–	2
Northwestern	0	–	8	–	1	0	–	10	–	1
+ – Conference co-champions; Rankings from AP Poll

1978 Ivy League football standings
	Conf.					Overall
Team	W		L		T	W		L		T
Dartmouth $	6	–	1	–	0	6	–	3	–	0
Brown	5	–	2	–	0	6	–	3	–	0
Yale	4	–	1	–	2	5	–	2	–	2
Cornell	3	–	3	–	1	5	–	3	–	1
Harvard	2	–	4	–	1	4	–	4	–	1
Columbia	2	–	4	–	1	3	–	5	–	1
Princeton	1	–	4	–	2	2	–	5	–	2
Penn	1	–	5	–	1	2	–	6	–	1
$ – Conference champion

1978 Mid-American Conference football standings
	Conf.					Overall
Team	W		L		T	W		L		T
Ball State $	8	–	0	–	0	10	–	1	–	0
Central Michigan	8	–	1	–	0	9	–	2	–	0
Miami (OH)	5	–	2	–	0	8	–	2	–	1
Western Michigan	5	–	4	–	0	7	–	4	–	0
Bowling Green	3	–	5	–	0	4	–	7	–	0
Ohio	3	–	5	–	0	3	–	8	–	0
Northern Illinois	2	–	4	–	0	5	–	6	–	0
Kent State	2	–	6	–	0	4	–	7	–	0
Toledo	2	–	7	–	0	2	–	9	–	0
Eastern Michigan	1	–	5	–	0	3	–	7	–	0
$ – Conference champion

1978 Missouri Valley Conference football standings
	Conf.					Overall
Team	W		L		T	W		L		T
New Mexico State $	5	–	1	–	0	6	–	5	–	0
Tulsa	4	–	1	–	0	9	–	2	–	0
Southern Illinois	3	–	2	–	0	7	–	4	–	0
Drake	3	–	3	–	0	4	–	7	–	0
Indiana State	2	–	3	–	0	3	–	8	–	0
Wichita State	2	–	4	–	0	4	–	7	–	0
West Texas State	1	–	5	–	0	3	–	8	–	0
$ – Conference champion

1978 Pacific Coast Athletic Association football standings
	Conf.					Overall
Team	W		L		T	W		L		T
Utah State +	4	–	1	–	0	7	–	4	–	0
San Jose State +	4	–	1	–	0	7	–	5	–	0
Pacific (CA)	3	–	2	–	0	4	–	8	–	0
Cal State Fullerton	2	–	2	–	0	5	–	7	–	0
Long Beach State	1	–	4	–	0	5	–	6	–	0
Fresno State	1	–	4	–	0	3	–	8	–	0
+ – Conference co-champions; Utah State's game against Wyoming counted in the conference standings.

1978 Pacific-10 Conference football standings
	Conf.					Overall
Team	W		L		T	W		L		T
No. 2 USC $	6	–	1	–	0	12	–	1	–	0
No. 14 UCLA	6	–	2	–	0	8	–	3	–	1
Washington	6	–	2	–	0	7	–	4	–	0
Arizona State	4	–	3	–	0	9	–	3	–	0
No. 17 Stanford	4	–	3	–	0	8	–	4	–	0
California	3	–	4	–	0	6	–	5	–	0
Arizona	3	–	4	–	0	5	–	6	–	0
Oregon	2	–	5	–	0	2	–	9	–	0
Oregon State	2	–	6	–	0	3	–	7	–	1
Washington State	1	–	7	–	0	3	–	7	–	1
$ – Conference champion; Rankings from AP Poll

1978 Southeastern Conference football standings
	Conf.					Overall
Team	W		L		T	W		L		T
No. 1 Alabama $	6	–	0	–	0	11	–	1	–	0
No. 16 Georgia	5	–	0	–	1	9	–	2	–	1
Auburn	3	–	2	–	1	6	–	4	–	1
LSU	3	–	3	–	0	8	–	4	–	0
Tennessee	3	–	3	–	0	5	–	5	–	1
Florida	3	–	3	–	0	4	–	7	–	0
Mississippi State	2	–	4	–	0	6	–	5	–	0
Ole Miss	2	–	4	–	0	5	–	6	–	0
Kentucky	2	–	4	–	0	4	–	6	–	1
Vanderbilt	0	–	6	–	0	2	–	9	–	0
$ – Conference champion; Rankings from AP Poll

1978 Southern Conference football standings
	Conf.					Overall
Team	W		L		T	W		L		T
Furman +	4	–	1	–	0	8	–	3	–	0
Chattanooga +	4	–	1	–	0	7	–	3	–	1
Appalachian State	4	–	2	–	0	7	–	4	–	0
Western Carolina	4	–	2	–	0	6	–	5	–	0
The Citadel	2	–	3	–	0	5	–	6	–	0
VMI	1	–	4	–	0	3	–	8	–	0
Marshall	0	–	5	–	0	1	–	10	–	0
Davidson	0	–	0	–	0	5	–	5	–	0
East Tennessee State	0	–	0	–	0	4	–	7	–	0
+ – Conference co-champions; The conference was a hybrid of NCAA Division I-A and I-AA teams. Davidson was classified as I-AA. All the other teams were classified as I-A. Davidson and East Tennessee State were ineligible for the conference title. VMI's games against William & Mary and Richmond and Chattanooga's game against Richmond were designated as conference games and counted in the SoCon standings.

1978 Southland Conference football standings
	Conf.					Overall
Team	W		L		T	W		L		T
Louisiana Tech +	4	–	1	–	0	6	–	5	–	0
Arkansas State +	4	–	1	–	0	7	–	4	–	0
UT Arlington	3	–	2	–	0	5	–	6	–	0
McNeese State	2	–	3	–	0	7	–	4	–	0
Southwestern Louisiana	2	–	3	–	0	3	–	8	–	0
Lamar	0	–	5	–	0	2	–	8	–	1
+ – Conference co-champions

1978 Southwest Conference football standings
	Conf.					Overall
Team	W		L		T	W		L		T
No. 10 Houston $	7	–	1	–	0	9	–	3	–	0
No. 11 Arkansas	6	–	2	–	0	9	–	2	–	1
No. 9 Texas	6	–	2	–	0	9	–	3	–	0
Texas Tech	5	–	3	–	0	7	–	4	–	0
No. 19 Texas A&M	4	–	4	–	0	8	–	4	–	0
SMU	3	–	5	–	0	4	–	6	–	1
Baylor	3	–	5	–	0	3	–	8	–	0
Rice	2	–	6	–	0	2	–	9	–	0
TCU	0	–	8	–	0	2	–	9	–	0
$ – Conference champion; Rankings from AP Poll

1978 Western Athletic Conference football standings
	Conf.					Overall
Team	W		L		T	W		L		T
BYU $	5	–	1	–	0	9	–	4	–	0
Utah	4	–	2	–	0	8	–	3	–	0
Wyoming	4	–	2	–	0	5	–	7	–	0
New Mexico	3	–	3	–	0	7	–	5	–	0
Colorado State	2	–	4	–	0	5	–	6	–	0
San Diego State	2	–	4	–	0	4	–	7	–	0
UTEP	1	–	5	–	0	1	–	11	–	0
$ – Conference champion

1978 NCAA Division I-A independents football records
	Conf.					Overall
Team	W		L		T	W		L		T
No. 4 Penn State		–		–		11	–	1	–	0
North Texas State		–		–		9	–	2	–	0
East Carolina		–		–		9	–	3	–	0
Navy		–		–		9	–	3	–	0
No. 7 Notre Dame		–		–		9	–	3	–	0
Rutgers		–		–		9	–	3	–	0
Florida State		–		–		8	–	3	–	0
Tennessee State		–		–		8	–	3	–	0
Temple		–		–		7	–	3	–	1
Pittsburgh		–		–		8	–	4	–	0
Holy Cross		–		–		7	–	4	–	0
Louisville		–		–		7	–	4	–	0
UNLV		–		–		7	–	4	–	0
Southern Miss		–		–		7	–	4	–	0
Northeast Louisiana		–		–		6	–	4	–	1
Georgia Tech		–		–		7	–	5	–	0
Hawaii		–		–		6	–	5	–	0
Miami (FL)		–		–		6	–	5	–	0
South Carolina		–		–		5	–	5	–	1
William & Mary		–		–		5	–	5	–	1
Cincinnati		–		–		5	–	6	–	0
Villanova		–		–		5	–	6	–	0
Army		–		–		4	–	6	–	1
Memphis State		–		–		4	–	7	–	0
Tulane		–		–		4	–	7	–	0
Virginia Tech		–		–		4	–	7	–	0
Air Force		–		–		3	–	8	–	0
Colgate		–		–		3	–	8	–	0
Richmond		–		–		3	–	8	–	0
Syracuse		–		–		3	–	8	–	0
Illinois State		–		–		2	–	9	–	0
West Virginia		–		–		2	–	9	–	0
Boston College		–		–		0	–	11	–	0
Rankings from AP Poll

== No. 1 and No. 2 progress ==
WEEKS	No. 1	No. 2	Event
PRE-3	Alabama	Arkansas	USC 24, Alabama 14 (Sept 23)
4	Oklahoma	Arkansas	USC 30, Michigan St 9 (Sept 29)
5-6	Oklahoma	USC	Arizona St. 20, USC 7 (Oct 14)
7-10	Oklahoma	Penn State	Nebraska 17, Oklahoma 14 (Nov 11)
11	Penn State	Nebraska	Missouri 35, Nebraska 31 (Nov 18)
12-14	Penn State	Alabama	Alabama 14, Penn State 7 (Jan 1)

== Notable rivalry games ==
- Arizona St. 18, Arizona 17
- Alabama 34, Auburn 16
- Stanford 30, Cal 10
- USC 17, UCLA 10
- USC 27, Notre Dame 25
- Nebraska 17, Oklahoma 14

== I-AA team wins over I-A teams ==
Italics denotes I-AA teams.

Date	Visiting team	Home team	Site	Result	Attendance	Ref.
September 9	Cal State Fullerton	Boise State	Bronco Stadium • Boise, Idaho	12–42	19,032	
September 9	Western Carolina	Tennessee Tech	Tucker Stadium • Cookeville, Tennessee	20–22		
September 16	Long Beach State	Boise State	Bronco Stadium • Boise, Idaho	13–19	19,435	
September 16	Western Carolina	East Tennessee State	Memorial Center • Johnson City, Tennessee	14–21	5,269	
September 16	Nevada	UNLV	Las Vegas Silver Bowl • Whitney, Nevada (Battle for Nevada)	23–14	20,910	
September 16	Western Kentucky	Illinois State	Hancock Stadium • Normal, Illinois	28–6	12,000	
September 23	Central Michigan	Alcorn State	Mississippi Veterans Memorial Stadium • Jackson, Mississippi	16–24		
September 23	Colgate	No. 1 (I-AA) Lehigh	Taylor Stadium • Bethlehem, Pennsylvania	7–38	13,500	
September 30	Rhode Island	Brown	Brown Stadium • Providence, Rhode Island (rivalry)	17–3	8,500	
October 7	No. 5 (I-AA) Boston University	Dartmouth	Memorial Field • Hanover, New Hampshire	20–17	9,750	
October 14	San José State	Boise State	Bronco Stadium • Boise, Idaho	15–30	18,112	
October 14	No. 3 (I-AA) Nevada	Cal State Fullerton	Falcon Stadium • Norwalk, California	37–14		
October 21	Penn	Lafayette	Fisher Field • Easton, Pennsylvania	19–20	11,200	
October 21	No. 5 (I-AA) Lehigh	VMI	Alumni Memorial Field • Lexington, Virginia	14–10	8,400	
October 28	East Tennessee State	Appalachian State	Conrad Stadium • Boone, North Carolina	35–34	14,471	
October 28	Illinois State	Western Illinois	Hanson Field • Macomb, Illinois	20–26		
November 4	Holy Cross	Boston University	Nickerson Field • Boston, Massachusetts	7–15	8,760	
November 4	Illinois State	No. 9 (I-AA) Eastern Illinois	O'Brien Stadium • Charleston, Illinois (Mid-America Classic)	7–42	9,000	
November 11	Colgate	Bucknell	Memorial Stadium • Lewisburg, Pennsylvania	0–7	2,500	
November 11	UMass	Holy Cross	Fitton Field • Worcester, Massachusetts	33–8	20,614	
November 11	Montana State	Fresno State	Ratcliffe Stadium • Fresno, California	35–14	7,258	
November 11	Weber State	Utah State	Romney Stadium • Logan, Utah	44–25	6,102	
November 18	Chattanooga	Tennessee State	Hale Stadium • Nashville, Tennessee	23–27	10,000	
November 25	Boston College	UMass	Alumni Stadium • Hadley, Massachusetts	0–27	7,950	
^{#}Rankings from AP Poll released prior to game.

Note: Miami (OH) at Dayton tied 10–10.

=== Division II team wins over I-A teams ===
Italics denotes D-II teams.

Date	Visiting team	Home team	Site	Result	Attendance	Ref.
November 11	Villanova	No. 4 (D-II) Delaware	Delaware Stadium • Newark, Delaware (Battle of the Blue)	22–23	20,189	
November 18	Colgate	No. 3 (D-II) Delaware	Delaware Stadium • Newark, Delaware	29–38	19,003	
^{#}Rankings from AP Poll released prior to game.

== Bowls ==
=== Bowl bids ===
Top ranked Penn State, as an independent, was not tied to any bowl game so the Nittany Lions accepted the Sugar Bowl invitation where they would meet SEC Champion Alabama, who was ranked 2nd in the AP and 3rd in the UPI. Pac-10 champion USC (ranked 3rd in the AP and 2nd in the UPI) faced No. 5 Michigan in the Rose Bowl in a battle of one loss teams. Nebraska had upset Oklahoma to earn the Big 8 title and automatic Orange Bowl berth; the Orange Bowl pulled a surprise by inviting the Sooners to play Nebraska in a rematch. Most observers felt Clemson would be invited and Oklahoma would play Houston in the Cotton Bowl Classic. The Cotton Bowl Classic bid went to Notre Dame and Clemson had to settle for the Gator Bowl despite a better record and higher ranking than Notre Dame.

=== Bowl results ===
In unusually cold and icy Dallas, Notre Dame overcame a 34–12 fourth quarter deficit to beat Houston 35–34. The Fighting Irish were led by quarterback Joe Montana in his final collegiate game. In New Orleans, Alabama made a 4th quarter goal line stand to upset No. 1 Penn State 14–7. In Pasadena, USC defeated Michigan 17–10, aided by an incredible performance (including the game-winning touchdown) by Charles White. In the Orange Bowl, Oklahoma won its rematch with Nebraska 31–24. One other Bowl of note saw Clemson beat Ohio State 17–15 in the Gator Bowl; the next day, legendary Ohio State coach Woody Hayes was fired for punching Clemson defensive back Charlie Bauman in the throat after his game-saving interception.

Major Bowls	Champion		Runner-up		Source
Cotton	No. 10 Notre Dame	35	No. 9 Houston	34	
Sugar	No. 2 Alabama	14	No. 1 Penn State	7	
Rose	No. 3 USC	17	No. 5 Michigan	10	
Orange	No. 4 Oklahoma	31	No. 6 Nebraska	24	
Other Bowls	Champion		Runner-up		Source
Gator	No. 7 Clemson	17	No. 20 Ohio State	15	
Fiesta	No. 8 Arkansas (tie)	10	No. 15 UCLA (tie)	10	
Bluebonnet	Stanford	25	No. 11 Georgia	22	
Peach	No. 17 Purdue	41	Georgia Tech	21	
Sun	No. 14 Texas	42	No. 13 Maryland	0	
Tangerine	NC State	30	No. 16 Pittsburgh	17	
Liberty	No. 18 Missouri	20	LSU	15	
Holiday	Navy	23	BYU	16	
Hall of Fame	Texas A&M	28	No. 19 Iowa State	12	
Independence	East Carolina	35	Louisiana Tech	13	
Garden State	Arizona State	34	Rutgers	18	

== National champion ==
The season ended with the top 3 teams (Alabama, USC, and Oklahoma) with one loss. In the AP poll, Alabama (11–1–0), on the strength of their Sugar Bowl win over former No. 1 Penn State, was voted No. 1. In the UPI poll, USC (12–1–0) was voted No. 1, based in a large part on their 24–14 win at Alabama over the Crimson Tide. Oklahoma, who was No. 1 for most of the season, felt that they should be national champs as they avenged their only loss by beating Nebraska in the Orange Bowl. The Sooners had to settle for the No. 3 ranking in both polls.

== Final AP and UPI rankings ==
Rank	AP	UPI
1.	Alabama	USC
2.	USC	Alabama
3.	Oklahoma	Oklahoma
4.	Penn State	Penn State
5.	Michigan	Michigan
6.	Clemson	Notre Dame
7.	Notre Dame	Clemson
8.	Nebraska	Nebraska
9.	Texas	Texas
10.	Houston	Arkansas
11.	Arkansas	Houston
12.	Michigan State	UCLA
13.	Purdue	Purdue
14.	UCLA	Missouri
15.	Missouri	Georgia
16.	Georgia	Stanford
17.	Stanford	Navy
18.	N.C. State	Texas A&M
19.	Texas A&M	Arizona State
20.	Maryland	N.C. State

== Heisman Trophy voting ==
The Heisman Trophy is given to the year's most outstanding player

Player	School	Position	1st	2nd	3rd	Total
Billy Sims	Oklahoma	RB	151	152	70	827
Chuck Fusina	Penn State	QB	163	89	83	750
Rick Leach	Michigan	QB	89	58	52	435
Charles White	USC	RB	36	74	98	354
Charles Alexander	LSU	RB	42	51	54	282
Steve Fuller	Clemson	QB	19	6	13	82
Ted Brown	NC State	TB	5	19	29	82
Eddie Lee Ivery	Georgia Tech	RB	11	19	10	81
Jack Thompson	Washington State	QB	13	11	11	72
Jerry Robinson	UCLA	LB	12	11	12	70

== Other major awards ==
- Maxwell (outstanding player) – Chuck Fusina, Penn St. QB
- Outland (Interior Lineman) – Greg Roberts, Oklahoma G
- Camp (Running back) – Billy Sims, Oklahoma RB
- Lombardi (Linebacker) – Bruce Clark, Penn St. D

== Attendances ==
Average home attendance top 3:

Rank	Team	Average
1	Michigan Wolverines	104,948
2	Ohio State Buckeyes	87,840
3	Tennessee Volunteers	78,422

== See also ==
- 1978 NCAA Division I-AA football season
- 1978 NCAA Division II football season
- 1978 NCAA Division III football season
