= 1978 Little All-America college football team =

American college football all-star team

The 1978 Little All-America college football team is composed of college football players from small colleges and universities who were selected by the Associated Press (AP) as the best players at each position.

== First team ==
Position	Player	Team
Offense
Quarterback	Jeff Komlo	Delaware
Running back	Jerry Aldridge	Angelo State
Running back	Frank Hawkins	Nevada
Wide receiver	Randy Jordan	Weber State
Wide receiver	James Warring	Eastern Illinois
Tight end	Dan Ross	Northeastern
Tackle	Jon Borchardt	Montana State
Tackle	Billy John	Texas A&I
Guard	Bruce Kimball	UMass
Guard	Tyrone McGriff	Florida A&M
Center	Frank Bouressa	Lawrence
Defense
Defensive end]	Jim Haslett	IUP
Defensive end]	John Mohring	C. W. Post
Defensive tackle	Jesse Baker	Jacksonville State
Defensive tackle	Robert Hardy	Jackson State
Middle guard	James Curry	Nevada
Linebacker	Jerry Lumpkin	Northern Arizona
Linebacker	Tim Tucker	Troy State
Linebacker	John Zamberlin	Pacific Lutheran
Defensive back	Mike Betts	Austin Peay
Defensive back	Dennis Duncanson	Weber State
Defensive back	Bill Moats	South Dakota

== See also ==
- 1978 College Football All-America Team
