= List of Eastern Illinois Panthers in the NFL draft =

This is a list of Eastern Illinois Panthers football players in the NFL draft.

== Key ==
B	Back	K	Kicker	NT	Nose tackle
C	Center	LB	Linebacker	FB	Fullback
DB	Defensive back	P	Punter	HB	Halfback
DE	Defensive end	QB	Quarterback	WR	Wide receiver
DT	Defensive tackle	RB	Running back	G	Guard
E	End	T	Offensive tackle	TE	Tight end

== Selections ==
Year	Round	Pick	Player	Team	Position
1941	17	159	Bill Glenn	Chicago Bears	B
1964	16	224	Roderick Butler	Chicago Bears	RB
1966	19	287	Roger Haberer	Chicago Bears	RB
1974	16	411	Nate Anderson	Washington Redskins	RB
1977	4	93	Ted Petersen	Pittsburgh Steelers	C
1980	8	220	Tom Pettigrew	Los Angeles Rams	T
1983	5	117	Jeff Christensen	Cincinnati Bengals	QB
1987	5	114	Roy Banks	Indianapolis Colts	WR
1989	7	175	Dave Popp	New York Giants	T
1993	7	179	Brad Fichtel	Los Angeles Rams	C
1995	4	114	Ray McElroy	Indianapolis Colts	DB
1999	3	67	Chris Watson	Denver Broncos	DB
2010	5	152	Otis Hudson	Cincinnati Bengals	T
2014	2	62	Jimmy Garoppolo	New England Patriots	QB
2016	6	208	Kamu Grugier-Hill	New England Patriots	LB

== Notable undrafted players ==
Note: No drafts held before 1936

Debut year	Player name	Position	Debut NFL/AFL team	Notes
1958	Ray Fisher	DT	Pittsburgh Steelers	—
1980	Jeff Gossett	P	Dallas Cowboys	Pro Bowl (1991)
1980	Jack Lafferty	C	Seattle Seahawks	—
1980	Steve Turk	QB	Green Bay Packers	—
1981	Steve Parker	DE	New Orleans Saints	—
1982	Clinton Davenport	T	Chicago Bears	—
1982	Kevin Gray	DB	New Orleans Saints	—
1984	Robert Williams	DB	Pittsburgh Steelers	—
1986	Evan Arapostathis	P	St. Louis Cardinals	—
1986	Mel Black	LB	New England Patriots	—
1987	Chris Geile	T	Detroit Lions	—
1987	Sean Payton	QB	Chicago Bears	—
1990	John Jurkovic	DT	Miami Dolphins	—
1997	John Moyer	DL	Indianapolis Colts	—
1997	Bob Rosenstiel	TE	Oakland Raiders	—
2003	Tony Romo	QB	Dallas Cowboys	Pro Bowl (2006), (2007), (2009), (2014)
2003	J. R. Taylor	RB	Green Bay Packers	—
2007	Tristan Burge	S	Green Bay Packers	—
2008	Micah Rucker	WR	Pittsburgh Steelers	—
2009	Pierre Walters	LB	Kansas City Chiefs	—
2010	Chris Campbell	OT	Green Bay Packers	—
2014	Erik Lora	WR	Minnesota Vikings	—
2019	Alexander Hollins	WR	Minnesota Vikings	—
