= 1978 San Francisco State Gators football team =

American college football season

1978 San Francisco State Gators football
- Conference: Far Western Conference
- Record: 1–9 (0–5 FWC)
- Head coach: Vic Rowen (18th season)
- Home stadium: Cox Stadium

1978 Far Western Conference football standings
	Conf.					Overall
Team	W		L		T	W		L		T
No. 4 UC Davis $^	5	–	0	–	0	8	–	3	–	0
Cal State Hayward	4	–	1	–	0	8	–	2	–	0
Humboldt State	3	–	2	–	0	5	–	6	–	0
Chico State	2	–	3	–	0	5	–	5	–	0
Sacramento State	1	–	4	–	0	1	–	9	–	0
San Francisco State	0	–	5	–	0	1	–	9	–	0
$ – Conference champion; ^ – NCAA Division II playoff participant; Rankings from Associated Press poll

The 1978 San Francisco State Gators football team represented San Francisco State University as a member of the Far Western Conference (FWC) during the 1978 NCAA Division II football season. Led by 18th-year head coach Vic Rowen, San Francisco State compiled an overall record of 1–9 with a mark of 0–5 in conference play, placing last out of six teams in the FWC. For the season the team was outscored by its opponents 271 to 136. The Gators played home games at Cox Stadium in San Francisco.

== Schedule ==
Date	Opponent	Site	Result	Attendance	Source
September 9	Cal State Northridge*	Cox Stadium; San Francisco, CA	L 0–27	1,000	
September 16	at Cal Poly Pomona*	Kellogg Field; Pomona, CA	W 16–14	1,800–3,000	
September 30	at Nevada*	Mackay Stadium; Reno, NV	L 14–37	7,983–7,992	
October 7	Chico State	Cox Stadium; San Francisco, CA	L 24–28	1,837	
October 14	at Cal State Hayward	Pioneer Stadium; Hayward, CA	L 10–26	1,016	
October 21	Sacramento State	Cox Stadium; San Francisco, CA	L 10–13	1,312	
October 28	at Humboldt State	Redwood Bowl; Arcata, CA	L 9–23	4,000	
November 4	No. 4 UC Davis	Cox Stadium; San Francisco, CA	L 12–40	2,683	
November 11	at Portland State*	Civic Stadium; Portland, OR	L 21–35	1,100	
November 18	Cal Lutheran*	Cox Stadium; San Francisco, CA	L 20–28	1,012	
*Non-conference game; Rankings from Associated Press Poll released prior to the game

== Team players in the NFL ==
The following San Francisco State players were selected in the 1979 NFL draft.

Player	Position	Round	Overall	NFL team
Frank Duncan	Defensive back	12	321	San Diego Chargers
