= 1978 Portland State Vikings football team =

American college football season

1978 Portland State Vikings football
- Conference: Independent
- Record: 5–6
- Head coach: Mouse Davis (4th season)
- Home stadium: Civic Stadium

1978 NCAA Division I-AA independents football standings
	Conf.			Overall
Team	W	L	T	W		L		T
No. 1 Nevada ^		–		11	–	1	–	0
No. 9 Lehigh		–		8	–	3	–	0
Northeastern		–		6	–	5	–	0
Bucknell		–		5	–	5	–	0
Northwestern State		–		5	–	6	–	0
Portland State		–		5	–	6	–	0
Lafayette		–		4	–	7	–	0
^ – NCAA Division I-AA playoff participant; Rankings from Associated Press poll

The 1978 Portland State Vikings football team was an American football team that represented Portland State University as an independent during the 1978 NCAA Division I-AA football season. Led by fourth-year head coach Mouse Davis, the Vikings compiled a 5–6 record.

== Schedule ==
Date	Opponent	Site	Result	Attendance	Source
September 9	at Northern Arizona	NAU Skydome; Flagstaff, AZ	L 14–42		
September 16	Montana	Civic Stadium; Portland, OR	W 27–16		
September 23	at Idaho State	ASISU Minidome; Pocatello, ID	L 13–27		
September 30	Sacramento State	Civic Stadium; Portland, OR	W 63–7		
October 7	at No. 3 (D-II) Cal Poly	Mustang Stadium; San Luis Obispo, CA	L 20–56	6,025	
October 14	at Humboldt State	Redwood Bowl; Arcata, CA	L 27–41	3,000	
October 21	Simon Fraser	Civic Stadium; Portland, OR	W 48–30	2,711	
October 28	at Puget Sound	Baker Stadium; Tacoma, WA	L 21–34		
November 4	at Cal State Northridge	North Campus Stadium; Northridge, CA	L 27–42	4,500	
November 11	San Francisco State	Civic Stadium; Portland, OR	W 35–21	1,100	
November 18	South Dakota State	Civic Stadium; Portland, OR	W 42–21		
Rankings from Associated Press Poll released prior to the game
