= 1978 Cal State Hayward Pioneers football team =

American college football season

1978 Cal State Hayward Pioneers football
- Conference: Far Western Conference
- Record: 8–2 (4–1 FWC)
- Head coach: Tim Tierney (4th season)
- Home stadium: Pioneer Stadium

1978 Far Western Conference football standings
	Conf.					Overall
Team	W		L		T	W		L		T
No. 4 UC Davis $^	5	–	0	–	0	8	–	3	–	0
Cal State Hayward	4	–	1	–	0	8	–	2	–	0
Humboldt State	3	–	2	–	0	5	–	6	–	0
Chico State	2	–	3	–	0	5	–	5	–	0
Sacramento State	1	–	4	–	0	1	–	9	–	0
San Francisco State	0	–	5	–	0	1	–	9	–	0
$ – Conference champion; ^ – NCAA Division II playoff participant; Rankings from Associated Press poll

The 1978 Cal State Hayward Pioneers football team represented California State University, Hayward—now known as California State University, East Bay—as a member of the Far Western Conference (FWC) during the 1978 NCAA Division II football season. Led by fourth-year head coach Tim Tierney, Cal State Hayward compiled an overall record of 8–2 with a mark of 4–1 in conference play, placing second in the FWC. The team outscored its opponents 212 to 136 for the season. The Pioneers played home games at Pioneer Stadium in Hayward, California.

== Schedule ==
Date	Opponent	Site	Result	Attendance	Source
September 16	Cal State Northridge*	Pioneer Stadium; Hayward, CA	W 13–3	1,000	
September 23	at Santa Clara*	Buck Shaw Stadium; Santa Clara, CA	W 38–7		
September 30	Saint Mary's*	Pioneer Stadium; Hayward, CA	W 31–10		
October 7	at No. 9 UC Davis	Toomey Field; Davis, CA	L 0–6		
October 14	San Francisco State	Pioneer Stadium; Hayward, CA	W 10–16		
October 21	Cal Poly Pomona*	Pioneer Stadium; Hayward, CA	W 7–7	600	
October 28	at Chico State	University Stadium; Chico, CA	W 36–29	1,500	
November 4	at No. 1 (I-AA) Nevada*	Mackay Stadium; Reno, NV	L 14–27	9,412	
November 11	Sacramento State	Pioneer Stadium; Hayward, CA	W 25–16		
November 18	at Humboldt State	Redwood Bowl; Arcata, CA	W 22–28	3,000	
*Non-conference game; Rankings from Associated Press Poll released prior to the game
