= 1978 Cal Poly Pomona Broncos football team =

American college football season

1978 Cal Poly Pomona Broncos football
- Conference: California Collegiate Athletic Association
- Record: 3–7 (1–1 CCAA)
- Head coach: Jim Jones (2nd season)
- Home stadium: Kellogg Field

1978 California Collegiate Athletic Association football standings
	Conf.					Overall
Team	W		L		T	W		L		T
No. 8 Cal Poly $^	2	–	0	–	0	7	–	3	–	0
Cal Poly Pomona	1	–	1	–	0	3	–	7	–	0
Cal State Northridge	0	–	2	–	0	5	–	5	–	0
$ – Conference champion; ^ – NCAA Division II playoff participant; The conference championship was unofficial because the CCAA had only three members.; Rankings from Associated Press poll

The 1978 Cal Poly Pomona Broncos football team represented California State Polytechnic University, Pomona as a member of the California Collegiate Athletic Association (CCAA) during the 1978 NCAA Division II football season. Led by second-year head coach Jim Jones, Cal Poly Pomona compiled an overall record of 3–7 with a mark of 1–1 in conference play, placing second in the CCAA. The team was outscored by its opponents 202 to 155 for the season. The Broncos played home games at Kellogg Field in Pomona, California.

== Schedule ==
Date	Opponent	Site	Result	Attendance	Source
September 16	San Francisco State*	Kellogg Field; Pomona, CA	L 14–16	1,800–3,000	
September 23	Sacramento State*	Kellogg Field; Pomona, CA	W 15–13	2,500	
September 30	at Chico State*	University Stadium; Chico, CA	L 3–23	2,500–2,611	
October 7	at Northern Arizona*	NAU Skydome; Flagstaff, AZ	L 3–31	16,153	
October 14	at Santa Clara*	Buck Shaw Stadium; Santa Clara, CA	L 15–22	7,400	
October 21	at Cal State Hayward*	Pioneer Stadium; Hayward, CA	L 10–17	600	
October 28	at Cal State Northridge	Devonshire Downs; Northridge, CA	W 31–15	3,500	
November 4	No. 4 Cal Poly	Kellogg Field; Pomona, CA	L 8–35	3,500	
November 11	United States International*	Valley Stadium; San Diego, CA	W 34–0	600	
November 18	Cal State Fullerton*	Kellogg Field; Pomona, CA	L 22–30	1,200	
*Non-conference game; Rankings from Associated Press Poll released prior to the game
