= 1978 Nicholls State Colonels football team =

American college football season

1978 Nicholls State Colonels football
- Conference: Gulf South Conference
- Record: 5–6 (5–2 GSC)
- Head coach: Bill Clements (5th season)
- Home stadium: John L. Guidry Stadium

1978 Gulf South Conference football standings
| | Conf. | | | | | Overall |
| Team | W | | L | | T | W | | L | | T |
|---|---|---|---|---|---|---|---|---|---|---|
| No. 7 Jacksonville State $ | 6 | – | 1 | – | 0 | 7 | – | 3 | – | 0 |
| Southeastern Louisiana | 5 | – | 1 | – | 1 | 7 | – | 3 | – | 1 |
| Troy State | 5 | – | 2 | – | 0 | 8 | – | 2 | – | 0 |
| Nicholls State | 5 | – | 2 | – | 0 | 5 | – | 6 | – | 0 |
| North Alabama | 4 | – | 2 | – | 1 | 7 | – | 2 | – | 1 |
| Mississippi College | 3 | – | 4 | – | 0 | 5 | – | 5 | – | 0 |
| Delta State | 2 | – | 6 | – | 0 | 3 | – | 7 | – | 0 |
| Livingston | 1 | – | 6 | – | 0 | 3 | – | 7 | – | 0 |
| Tennessee–Martin | 0 | – | 7 | – | 0 | 2 | – | 8 | – | 0 |
$ – Conference champion; Rankings from AP Poll

The 1978 Nicholls State Colonels football team represented Nicholls State University as a member of the Gulf South Conference (GSC) the 1978 NCAA Division II football season. Led by fifth-year head coach Bill Clements, the Colonels compiled an overall record of 5–6 with a conference mark of 5–2, tying for third place in the GSC. Nicholls State played home games at John L. Guidry Stadium in Thibodaux, Louisiana.

== Schedule ==
| Date | Opponent | Site | Result | Attendance | Source |
|---|---|---|---|---|---|
| September 2 | Tennessee Tech* | John L. Guidry Stadium; Thibodaux, LA | W 20–10 | 6,900 | |
| September 9 | Northeast Louisiana | John L. Guidry Stadium; Thibodaux, LA | L 0–3 | 3,500 | |
| September 16 | at Jacksonville State | Paul Snow Stadium; Jacksonville, AL | W 19–17 | 12,000 | |
| September 23 | Troy State | John L. Guidry Stadium; Thibodaux, LA | L 6–16 | 7,325 | |
| October 7 | at McNeese State* | Cowboy Stadium; Lake Charles, LA | L 10–35 | 18,000 | |
| October 14 | at Cameron* | Cameron Stadium; Lawton, OK | L 17–22 | 5,000 | |
| October 21 | Mississippi College | John L. Guidry Stadium; Thibodaux, LA | W 10–7 | 8,275 | |
| October 28 | at Northwestern State* | Harry Turpin Stadium; Natchitoches, LA (rivalry) | L 18–28 | 8,100 | |
| November 4 | at Tennessee–Martin | Pacer Stadium; Martin, TN | W 7–3 | 5,133 | |
| November 11 | vs. Southeastern Louisiana | Louisiana Superdome; New Orleans, LA (rivalry) | L 0–10 | 10,000 | |
| November 18 | at Delta State | McCool Stadium; Cleveland, MS | W 17–14 | 1,217 | |
*Non-conference game; Source:
