= 1978 Sacramento State Hornets football team =

American college football season

1978 Sacramento State Hornets football
- Conference: Far Western Conference
- Record: 1–9 (1–4 FWC)
- Head coach: Bob Mattos (1st season)
- Home stadium: Hornet Stadium

1978 Far Western Conference football standings
	Conf.					Overall
Team	W		L		T	W		L		T
No. 4 UC Davis $^	5	–	0	–	0	8	–	3	–	0
Cal State Hayward	4	–	1	–	0	8	–	2	–	0
Humboldt State	3	–	2	–	0	5	–	6	–	0
Chico State	2	–	3	–	0	5	–	5	–	0
Sacramento State	1	–	4	–	0	1	–	9	–	0
San Francisco State	0	–	5	–	0	1	–	9	–	0
$ – Conference champion; ^ – NCAA Division II playoff participant; Rankings from Associated Press poll

The 1978 Sacramento State Hornets football team represented California State University, Sacramento as a member of the Far Western Conference (FWC) during the 1978 NCAA Division II football season. Led by first-year head coach Bob Mattos, Sacramento State compiled an overall record of 1–9 with a mark of 1–4 in conference play, placing fifth in the FWC. The team was outscored by its opponents 304 to 84 for the season. The Hornets played home games at Hornet Stadium in Sacramento, California.

== Schedule ==
Date	Opponent	Site	Result	Attendance	Source
September 16	at Cal Poly*	Mustang Stadium; San Luis Obispo, CA	L 6–52	2,700	
September 23	at Cal Poly Pomona*	Kellogg Field; Pomona, CA	L 13–15	2,500	
September 30	at Portland State*	Civic Stadium; Portland, OR	L 7–63		
October 7	Humboldt State	Hornet Stadium; Sacramento, CA	L 10–22		
October 14	No. 6 UC Davis	Hornet Stadium; Sacramento, CA (rivalry)	L 0–39	6,000	
October 21	at San Francisco State	Cox Stadium; San Francisco, CA	W 13–10	1,312	
October 28	No. 2 (I-AA) Nevada*	Hornet Stadium; Sacramento, CA	L 15–39		
November 4	Chico State	Hornet Stadium; Sacramento, CA	L 3–12	1,850	
November 11	at Cal State Hayward	Pioneer Stadium; Hayward, CA	L 7–21		
November 18	at Cal State Northridge*	Devonshire Downs / North Campus Stadium; Northridge, CA	L 9–31	1,900	
*Non-conference game; Rankings from Associated Press Poll released prior to the game
