= 1978 Humboldt State Lumberjacks football team =

American college football season

1978 Humboldt State Lumberjacks football
- Conference: Far Western Conference
- Record: 5–6 (3–2 FWC)
- Head coach: Bud Van Deren (13th season)
- Home stadium: Redwood Bowl

1978 Far Western Conference football standings
	Conf.					Overall
Team	W		L		T	W		L		T
No. 4 UC Davis $^	5	–	0	–	0	8	–	3	–	0
Cal State Hayward	4	–	1	–	0	8	–	2	–	0
Humboldt State	3	–	2	–	0	5	–	6	–	0
Chico State	2	–	3	–	0	5	–	5	–	0
Sacramento State	1	–	4	–	0	1	–	9	–	0
San Francisco State	0	–	5	–	0	1	–	9	–	0
$ – Conference champion; ^ – NCAA Division II playoff participant; Rankings from Associated Press poll

The 1978 Humboldt State Lumberjacks football team represented Humboldt State University—now known as California State Polytechnic University, Humboldt—as a member of the Far Western Conference (FWC) during the 1978 NCAA Division II football season. Led by 13th-year head coach Bud Van Deren, the Lumberjacks compiled an overall record of 5–6 with a mark of 3–2 in conference play, placing third in the FWC. The team was outscored by its opponents 258 to 231 for the season. Humboldt State played home games at the Redwood Bowl in Arcata, California.

== Schedule ==
Date	Opponent	Site	Result	Attendance	Source
September 9	Santa Clara*	Redwood Bowl; Arcata, CA	L 13–22	3,000	
September 16	at Linfield*	Maxwell Field; McMinnville, OR	L 21–35		
September 23	at Willamette*	McCulloch Stadium; Salem, OR	W 13–7		
September 30	Cal State Northridge*	Redwood Bowl; Arcata, CA	L 28–48	2,500–3,000	
October 7	at Sacramento State	Hornet Stadium; Sacramento, CA	W 22–10		
October 14	Portland State*	Redwood Bowl; Arcata, CA	W 41–27	3,000	
October 21	at No. 9 UC Davis	Toomey Field; Davis, CA	L 6–19	8,000	
October 28	San Francisco State	Redwood Bowl; Arcata, CA	W 23–9	3,000	
November 4	at Puget Sound*	Baker Stadium; Tacoma, WA	L 22–30		
November 11	Chico State	Redwood Bowl; Arcata, CA	W 28–23	3,000–3,150	
November 18	Cal State Hayward	Redwood Bowl; Arcata, CA	L 14–28	3,000	
*Non-conference game; Rankings from Associated Press Poll released prior to the game
