= 1978 Boise State Broncos football team =

American college football season

1978 Boise State Broncos football
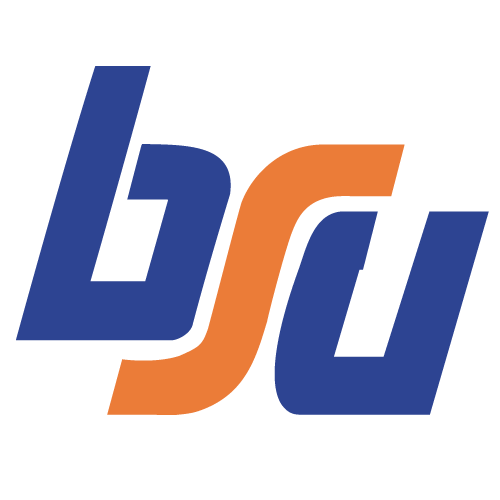
- Conference: Big Sky Conference
- Record: 7–4 (3–3 Big Sky)
- Head coach: Jim Criner (3rd season)
- Offensive coordinator: Gene Dahlquist (2nd season)
- Defensive coordinator: Bill Dutton (3rd season)
- Base defense: 3–4
- Home stadium: Bronco Stadium

1978 Big Sky Conference football standings
	Conf.					Overall
Team	W		L		T	W		L		T
No. 7 Northern Arizona $	6	–	0	–	0	8	–	2	–	0
No. T–9 Montana State	4	–	2	–	0	8	–	2	–	0
Montana	4	–	2	–	0	5	–	6	–	0
Boise State	3	–	3	–	0	7	–	4	–	0
Weber State	2	–	4	–	0	4	–	7	–	0
Idaho	2	–	4	–	0	2	–	9	–	0
Idaho State	0	–	6	–	0	2	–	9	–	0
$ – Conference champion; Rankings from NCAA Division I-AA AP Poll

The 1978 Boise State Broncos football team represented Boise State University in the 1978 NCAA Division I-AA football season. The Broncos competed in the Big Sky Conference and played their home games on campus at Bronco Stadium in Boise, Idaho. Led by third-year head coach Jim Criner, the Broncos were 7–4 overall and 3–3 in conference.

This was the first season for the newly created Division I-AA, which the Big Sky joined. It was previously a Division II conference for football, except for Division I member Idaho, which moved down to I-AA this season.

Following this season, Boise State was put on probation for a scouting violation in November prior to the NAU game; the Broncos were ineligible for the league title or the I-AA playoffs in 1979.

== Schedule ==
Date	Time	Opponent	Rank	Site	TV	Result	Attendance	Source
September 9	7:30 pm	Cal State Fullerton*		Bronco Stadium; Boise, ID		W 42–12	19,032	
September 16	7:30 pm	Long Beach State*		Bronco Stadium; Boise, ID		W 19–13	19,435	
September 23	7:30 pm	Northern Michigan*	No. 3	Bronco Stadium; Boise, ID		W 31–21	20,555	
September 30	1:30 pm	at No. 6 Montana State	No. 3	Reno H. Sales Stadium; Bozeman, MT	ABC	L 29–31	12,850	
October 7	7:30 pm	Montana	No. 8	Bronco Stadium; Boise, ID		L 7–15	19,580	
October 14	7:30 pm	San Jose State*		Bronco Stadium; Boise, ID		W 30–15	18,112	
October 21	7:30 pm	Weber State		Bronco Stadium; Boise, ID		W 14–13	17,858	
October 28	8:00 pm	at Idaho State		ISU Minidome; Pocatello, ID		W 16–14	6,983	
November 4	1:30 pm	Idaho^{†}		Bronco Stadium; Boise, ID (rivalry)		W 48–10	20,235	
November 11	7:00 pm	at No. 7 Northern Arizona	No. 9	NAU Skydome; Flagstaff, AZ		L 30–31	14,783	
November 18		at No. 8 (D-II) Cal Poly*		Mustang Stadium; San Luis Obispo, CA		L 3–7	7,430	
*Non-conference game; ^{†}Homecoming; Rankings from Associated Press Poll released prior to the game; All times are in Mountain time

== Rankings ==
Ranking movements Legend: ██ Increase in ranking ██ Decrease in ranking — = Not ranked
	Week									
Poll	1	2	3	4	5	6	7	8	9	Final
AP	3	3	8	—	—	—	—	9	—	—

== Roster ==
1978 Boise State Broncos football team roster
Players
Coaches
Offense

Pos.	#	Name	Class
QB	7	Kevin McDonald	So
FL	9	Mike Grant	Fr
QB	16	Hoskin Hogan	Jr
TB	20	Cedric Minter	So
TB	27	Terry Zahner	So
FB	33	David Hughes	So
TB	40	Fred Goode	Sr
C	56	Mark Villano	Sr
LG	64	Martin Bernardy	So
RG	68	Bill Roberds	Jr
RT	74	Jack White	Jr
LT	77	Doug MacLeod	Sr
TE	84	Webb Spahr	Jr
FL	89	Lonnie Hughes	Sr
SE	90	Duane Dlouhy	Fr
OT	73	Kevin Streett	Fr

Defense

Pos.	#	Name	Class
LCB	10	Larry Morritt	Sr
SS	25	Sam Miller	Sr
RCB	30	Layne Osborne	Sr
FS	49	Nash Balinton	Sr
OLB	43	Larry Lewis	So
ILB	44	Bob Macauley	Sr
OLB	47	Larry Polowski	Sr
ILB	55	Willie Beamon	Sr
NG	71	Bob Cabrera	Jr
RDT	75	Doug Scott	Jr
LDT	81	Jeff Taylor	Jr

Special teams

Pos.	#	Name	Class
K	18	Tom Sarette	Sr
P	19	Ed Thomas	Sr

Head coach

- Jim Criner (3rd year)

Coordinators/assistant coaches

- Gene Dahlquist (OC)
- Bill Dutton (DC/DL)
- Chuck Banker (LB)
- Dave Campo (DB)

Legend

- (C) Team captain
- (S) Suspended
- (I) Ineligible
- Injured
- Redshirt

== NFL draft ==
Two Broncos were selected in the 1979 NFL draft, which lasted 12 rounds (330 selections).

Player	Position	Round	Overall	Franchise
Larry Polowski	Linebacker	7th	169	Seattle Seahawks
Willie Beamon	Linebacker	8th	205	New York Jets
