= Jim Dennison =

American coach (1938–2026)

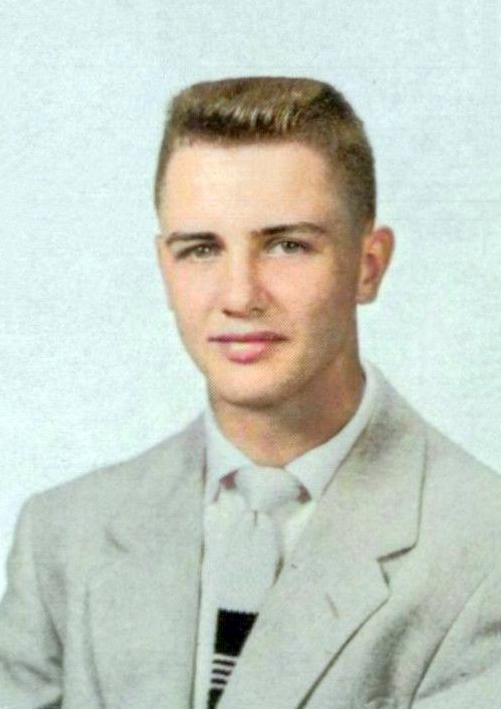
- High school yearbook portrait, 1956

Biographical details
- Born: February 12, 1938; Lodi, Ohio, U.S.
- Died: January 4, 2026 (aged 87); Ravenna, Ohio, U.S.
- Education: Wadsworth HS (OH)

Playing career

Football
- 1958–1959: Wooster

Coaching career (HC unless noted)

Football
- 1960: Wadsworth HS (OH) (assistant)
- 1961–1963: Elyria HS (OH) (assistant)
- 1964: Copley HS (OH)
- 1965–1972: Akron (assistant)
- 1973–1985: Akron
- 1995–2012: Walsh

Baseball
- 1961–1963: Elyria HS (OH)
- 1966: Akron

Administrative career (AD unless noted)
- 1986–1993: Akron
- 1993–2007: Walsh

Head coaching record
- Overall: 199–139–2 (college football); 9–0 (high school football); 4–12 (college baseball)
- Tournaments: Football; 2–1 (NCAA D-II playoffs); 0–1 (NCAA D-I-AA playoffs); 0–1 (NAIA playoffs)

Accomplishments and honors

Awards
- Football; AFCA College Division COY (1976); OVC Coach of the Year (1982)

James Leo Dennison (February 12, 1938 – January 4, 2026) was an American college football and baseball coach and college athletics administrator. From 1994 to 2012, he served as the head football coach at Walsh University in North Canton, Ohio. From 1973 to 1985, he was the head football coach at the University of Akron. He was also the head baseball coach at Akron in 1966. He served as the athletic director at Akron (1986–1993) and Walsh (1993–2007). Dennison played college football and college baseball at the College of Wooster, from which he graduated in 1960.

== Early life and education ==
James Leo Dennison was born in Lodi, Ohio, on February 5, 1938, to Leo and Lola Dennison. Dennison attended Wadsworth High School where he was an All-Metro League player in basketball, baseball, and football. He graduated from Wadsworth in 1956, and went on to attend the College of Wooster. He graduated in 1960 with a Bachelor of Education degree, after winning the Most Valuable Senior Athlete award for his work on the baseball and football teams that same year. He went on to receive his Master's in Physical Education from the University of Akron later in his career, circa 1969.

== Coaching career ==
After graduation, Dennison got his start coaching at his alma mater, Wadsworth High School, in 1960. The following year, he began a three-year stint with Elyria High School where he would compile a 54–16 record as head baseball coach. He also served as an assistant coach of football during this time. In June 1964 Dennison moved to Copley High School to become the head coach of the football team. The Copley Indians proceeded to go on what the Akron Beacon Journal referred to as a "warpath", going undefeated 9–0 on the season. He was named the Suburban League Coach of the Year for his efforts with the team.

=== University of Akron (1965–1993) ===
Dennison was hired as an assistant football coach in 1965 for the Akron Zips, focusing on the offensive backfield. During his time with Akron, Dennison had a good working relationship with Gordon K. Larson, the head coach of the football team and athletics director. This led to his promotion in 1969 to assistant head coach, working directly with Larson. In 1966, Dennison was named the head coach of the baseball team. He boasted a 4–12 record with the team. Akron baseball star Jim DiLauro was hired the following season.

Gordon Larson resigned from the head football coach position following the 1972 season. Dennison was hired as his replacement, just before the team would tackle "the toughest schedule in school history" as described by journalist Bob Nold. In 1976, Dennison would win the Kodak Coach of the Year Award after his team went 10–3, eventually losing the NCAA Division II championship to the Montana State Bobcats. Dennison would eventually finish his career with Akron with a 80–62–2 record.

In the midst of Akron moving up a division to Division I-AA, Dennison was relieved of the head coach position in 1985 to make room for ex-Notre Dame head coach Gerry Faust. Dennison was surprised by the decision and, in order to stay at the University of Akron, was forced to take an associate athletic director position. This coaching change was controversial, resulting in public outcry among fans. 218 people called the Akron Beacon Journal to complain about the decision to promote Dennison. Dennison was promoted to athletic director two years later in August 1987, and held the position for seven years until June 1993.

=== Walsh University (1993–2012) ===
Only two weeks after Dennison left the University of Akron, he was hired by Walsh University to be their athletic director. During his first few years as athletic director for Walsh, the university instated football as a sport, naming Dennison the head coach of the newly formed team for the 1995 season. As head coach, Dennison lead the team to fourteen winning seasons including a 2001 Mid-States Football Association championship in 2001 and NAIA playoff appearance in 2006. He resigned from the director position in 2007 to focus on his coaching, and retired from the sport entirely in 2012 as head coach and athletic director, with a final record at Walsh of 119–77.

== Legacy ==
Dennison was honored by both the University of Akron and Walsh University following his retirement. He was placed in the Athletics Ring of Honor at Akron in 2003, and in the Walsh Athletic Wall of Fame in 2013. He received the University of Akron Alumni Honor Award in 2012.

== Personal life and death ==
Dennison married Sue Jane Noggle in 1960, and the two were married until his death. He had four children. His brother, Terry, coached basketball at various institutions, including the University of Akron, where Dennison worked. Dennison died in Ravenna, Ohio, on January 4, 2026, at the age of 87. (Note: Some sources mislabel his death date as "January 5, 2026".)

== Head coaching record ==
=== College football ===
Year	Team	Overall	Conference	Standing	Bowl/playoffs	NCAA^{#}
Akron Zips (NCAA Division II independent) (1973–1977)
1973	Akron	6–5				
1974	Akron	5–5				
1975	Akron	7–4				
1976	Akron	10–3			L NCAA Division II Championship (Pioneer)	
1977	Akron	6–4–1				
Akron Zips (Association of Mid-Continent Universities) (1978–1979)
1978	Akron	6–5	4–1	2nd		
1979	Akron	6–5	3–2	3rd		
Akron Zips (Ohio Valley Conference) (1980–1985)
1980	Akron	3–7–1	2–4–1	5th		
1981	Akron	5–5	4–4	T–4th		
1982	Akron	6–5	5–2	2nd		
1983	Akron	8–3	5–2	T–2nd		
1984	Akron	4–7	2–5	6th		
1985	Akron	8–4	5–2	T–2nd	L NCAA Division I-AA First Round	10
Akron:		80–62–2	30–22–1			
Walsh Cavaliers (NAIA Division II independent) (1995)
1995	Walsh	7–3				
Walsh Cavaliers (Mid-States Football Association) (1996–2011)
1996	Walsh	6–5	3–3	4th (MEL)		
1997	Walsh	7–3	4–2	3rd (MEL)		
1998	Walsh	6–5	2–4	T–5th (MEL)		
1999	Walsh	7–3	4–2	3rd (MEL)		
2000	Walsh	6–5	4–2	2nd (MEL)		
2001	Walsh	8–3	5–1	T–1st (MEL)		
2002	Walsh	8–3	4–2	3rd (MEL)		
2003	Walsh	8–3	5–1	2nd (MEL)		
2004	Walsh	8–3	6–1	2nd (MEL)		
2005	Walsh	8–3	5–2	T–2nd (MEL)		
2006	Walsh	9–3	4–2	T–2nd (MEL)	L NAIA First Round	
2007	Walsh	5–6	2–5	6th (MEL)		
2008	Walsh	3–8	1–5	5th (MEL)		
2009	Walsh	8–3	5–2	T–2nd (MEL)		
2010	Walsh	7–4	3–4	5th (MEL)		
2011	Walsh	5–6	4–3 (unofficial)	N/A (MEL)		
Walsh Cavaliers (Great Lakes Intercollegiate Athletic Conference) (2012)
2012	Walsh	3–8	2–8	T–5th (South)		
Walsh:		119–77	63–46 (official)			
Total:		199–139–2				
National championship Conference title Conference division title or championship game berth
^{#}Rankings from NCAA Division I-AA Football Committee poll.
