= 1978 Cal State Northridge Matadors football team =

American college football season

1978 Cal State Northridge Matadors football
- Conference: California Collegiate Athletic Association
- Record: 5–5 (0–2 CCAA)
- Head coach: Jack Elway (3rd season)
- Home stadium: North Campus Stadium

1978 California Collegiate Athletic Association football standings
	Conf.					Overall
Team	W		L		T	W		L		T
No. 8 Cal Poly $^	2	–	0	–	0	7	–	3	–	0
Cal Poly Pomona	1	–	1	–	0	3	–	7	–	0
Cal State Northridge	0	–	2	–	0	5	–	5	–	0
$ – Conference champion; ^ – NCAA Division II playoff participant; The conference championship was unofficial because the CCAA had only three members.; Rankings from Associated Press poll

The 1978 Cal State Northridge Matadors football team represented California State University, Northridge as a member of the California Collegiate Athletic Association (CCAA) during the 1978 NCAA Division II football season. Led by Jack Elway in his third and final season as head coach, Cal State Northridge compiled an overall record of 5–5 with a mark of 0–2 in conference play, placing last out of three teams in the CCAA. The team outscored its opponents 252 to 214 for the season. The Matadors played home games at North Campus Stadium in Northridge, California.

== Schedule ==
Date	Opponent	Site	Result	Attendance	Source
September 9	at San Francisco State*	Cox Stadium; San Francisco, CA	W 27–0	1,000	
September 16	at Cal State Hayward*	Pioneer Stadium; Hayward, CA	L 17–24	1,000	
September 23	Chico State*	North Campus Stadium; Northridge, CA	W 28–7	2,583–3,752	
September 30	at Humboldt State*	Redwood Bowl; Arcata, CA	W 48–28	2,500–3,000	
October 7	at Santa Clara*	Buck Shaw Stadium; Santa Clara, CA	L 7–19	5,420	
October 21	at No. 4 Cal Poly	Mustang Stadium; San Luis Obispo, CA	L 17–38	6,180	
October 28	Cal Poly Pomona	North Campus Stadium; Northridge, CA	L 15–31	3,500	
November 4	Portland State*	North Campus Stadium; Northridge, CA	W 42–27	4,500	
November 11	Cal State Fullerton*	North Campus Stadium; Northridge, CA	L 20–31	2,500	
November 18	Sacramento State*	North Campus Stadium; Northridge, CA	W 31–9	1,900	
*Non-conference game; Rankings from Associated Press Poll released prior to the game
