= 1978 Chico State Wildcats football team =

American college football season

1978 Chico State Wildcats football
- Conference: Far Western Conference
- Record: 5–5 (2–3 FWC)
- Head coach: Dick Trimmer (5th season)
- Defensive coordinator: Roland "Red" Smith (1st season)
- Home stadium: University Stadium

1978 Far Western Conference football standings
	Conf.					Overall
Team	W		L		T	W		L		T
No. 4 UC Davis $^	5	–	0	–	0	8	–	3	–	0
Cal State Hayward	4	–	1	–	0	8	–	2	–	0
Humboldt State	3	–	2	–	0	5	–	6	–	0
Chico State	2	–	3	–	0	5	–	5	–	0
Sacramento State	1	–	4	–	0	1	–	9	–	0
San Francisco State	0	–	5	–	0	1	–	9	–	0
$ – Conference champion; ^ – NCAA Division II playoff participant; Rankings from Associated Press poll

The 1978 Chico State Wildcats football team represented California State University, Chico as a member of the Far Western Conference (FWC) during the 1978 NCAA Division II football season. Led by fifth-year head coach Dick Trimmer, Chico State compiled an overall record of 5–5 with a mark of 2–3 in conference play, placing fourth in the FWC. The team was outscored by its opponents 217 to 161 for the season. The Wildcats played home games at University Stadium in Chico, California.

== Schedule ==
Date	Opponent	Site	Result	Attendance	Source
September 16	Cal Lutheran*	University Stadium; Chico, CA	W 15–12	2,872	
September 23	at Cal State Northridge*	North Campus Stadium; Northridge, CA	L 7–28	2,583–3,752	
September 30	Cal Poly Pomona*	University Stadium; Chico, CA	W 23–3	2,500–2,611	
October 7	at San Francisco State	Cox Stadium; San Francisco, CA	W 28–24	1,837	
October 14	at Central Washington*	Tomlinson Stadium; Ellensburg, WA	W 24–11	2,000	
October 21	Puget Sound*	University Stadium; Chico, CA	L 16–35	2,622	
October 28	Cal State Hayward	University Stadium; Chico, CA	L 11–42	1,500	
November 4	at Sacramento State	Hornet Stadium; Sacramento, CA	W 12–3	1,850	
November 11	at Humboldt State	Redwood Bowl; Arcata, CA	L 23–28	3,000–3,150	
November 18	No. 4 UC Davis	University Stadium; Chico, CA	L 2–31	4,429	
*Non-conference game; Rankings from Associated Press Poll released prior to the game
