= 1978 Weber State Wildcats football team =

American college football season

1978 Weber State Wildcats football
- Conference: Big Sky Conference
- Record: 4–7 (2–4 Big Sky)
- Head coach: Pete Riehlman (2nd season)
- Home stadium: Wildcat Stadium

1978 Big Sky Conference football standings
	Conf.					Overall
Team	W		L		T	W		L		T
No. 7 Northern Arizona $	6	–	0	–	0	8	–	2	–	0
No. T–9 Montana State	4	–	2	–	0	8	–	2	–	0
Montana	4	–	2	–	0	5	–	6	–	0
Boise State	3	–	3	–	0	7	–	4	–	0
Weber State	2	–	4	–	0	4	–	7	–	0
Idaho	2	–	4	–	0	2	–	9	–	0
Idaho State	0	–	6	–	0	2	–	9	–	0
$ – Conference champion; Rankings from NCAA Division I-AA AP Poll

The 1978 Weber State Wildcats football team represented Weber State College (now known as Weber State University) as a member of the Big Sky Conference during the 1978 NCAA Division I-AA football season. Led by second-year head coach Pete Riehlman, the Wildcats compiled an overall record of 4–7, with a mark of 2–4 in conference play, and finished tied for fifth in the Big Sky.

== Schedule ==
Date	Opponent	Site	Result	Attendance	Source
September 9	North Dakota State*	Wildcat Stadium; Ogden, UT	L 28–49	12,062	
September 16	at Fresno State*	Ratcliffe Stadium; Fresno, CA	L 14–55	11,373	
September 23	Northern Iowa*	Wildcat Stadium; Ogden, UT	W 35–9	7,486	
September 30	Montana	Wildcat Stadium; Ogden, UT	L 7–27	8,571	
October 7	No. 2 Montana State	Wildcat Stadium; Ogden, UT	L 14–21	7,891	
October 14	at Utah*	Robert Rice Stadium; Salt Lake City, UT	L 7–30	23,458	
October 21	at Boise State	Bronco Stadium; Boise, ID	L 13–14	17,858	
October 28	at Idaho	Kibbie Dome; Moscow, ID	W 51–6	13,500	
November 4	Idaho State	Wildcat Stadium; Ogden, UT	W 34–12	7,021	
November 11	at Utah State*	Romney Stadium; Logan, UT	W 44–25	6,102	
November 18	at Northern Arizona	NAU Skydome; Flagstaff, AZ	L 0–10	11,491	
*Non-conference game; Rankings from Associated Press Poll released prior to the game
