= 1978 Akron Zips football team =

American college football season

1978 Akron Zips football
- Conference: Mid-Continent Conference
- Record: 6–5 (4–1 MCC)
- Head coach: Jim Dennison (6th season)
- Captain: Marty Bezbatchenko; Mike Holian
- Home stadium: Rubber Bowl

1978 Association of Mid-Continent Universities football standings
	Conf.					Overall
Team	W		L		T	W		L		T
Youngstown State $^	5	–	0	–	0	10	–	2	–	0
Akron	4	–	1	–	0	6	–	5	–	0
Eastern Illinois ^	3	–	2	–	0	12	–	2	–	0
Northern Michigan	1	–	3	–	1	5	–	4	–	1
Western Illinois	1	–	3	–	1	3	–	6	–	1
Northern Iowa	0	–	5	–	0	2	–	9	–	0
$ – Conference champion; ^ – NCAA Division II playoff participant

The 1978 Akron Zips football team represented Akron University in the 1978 NCAA Division II football season as a member of the Mid-Continent Conference. Led by sixth-year head coach Jim Dennison, the Zips played their home games at the Rubber Bowl in Akron, Ohio. They finished the season with a record of 6–5 overall and 4–1 in MCC play, placing second.

== Schedule ==
Date	Opponent	Rank	Site	Result	Attendance	Source
September 9	at Western Illinois		Hanson Field; Macomb, IL	W 19–3	11,300	
September 16	at Northeast Missouri State*		Stokes Stadium; Kirksville, MS	L 13–14	5,032	
September 23	Wayne State (MI)*		Rubber Bowl; Akron, OH	W 28–0	34,529	
September 30	No. 4 Eastern Illinois		Rubber Bowl; Akron, OH	W 17–16	3,278	
October 7	at No. 10 (I-AA) Western Kentucky*	No. 6	L. T. Smith Stadium; Bowling Green, KY	W 26–21	15,600	
October 14	at Eastern Michigan*	No. 4	Rynearson Stadium; Ypsilanti, MI	L 14–25	7,298	
October 21	at No. 2 Youngstown State	No. 6	Rayen Stadium; Youngstown, OH (Steel Tire)	L 3–27	10,200	
October 28	No. 9 Northern Michigan		Rubber Bowl; Akron, OH	W 27–7	10,017	
November 4	Temple*	No. 8	Rubber Bowl; Akron, OH	L 21–56	10,467	
November 11	at No. 8 (I-AA) Eastern Kentucky		Hanger Field; Richmond, KY	L 14–35	8,800	
November 18	Northern Iowa		Rubber Bowl; Akron, OH	W 39–28	5,500–5,522	
*Non-conference game; Rankings from AP Poll released prior to the game
