= 1978 Eastern Illinois Panthers football team =

American college football season

1978 Eastern Illinois Panthers football

NCAA Division II champion

NCAA Division II Championship Game, W 10–9 vs. Delaware
- Conference: Association of Mid-Continent Universities
- Record: 12–2 (3–2 Mid-Con)
- Head coach: Darrell Mudra (1st season)
- Offensive coordinator: Mike Shanahan (1st season)
- Defensive coordinator: John Teerlinck (1st season)
- Home stadium: O'Brien Stadium

1978 Association of Mid-Continent Universities football standings
	Conf.					Overall
Team	W		L		T	W		L		T
Youngstown State $^	5	–	0	–	0	10	–	2	–	0
Akron	4	–	1	–	0	6	–	5	–	0
Eastern Illinois ^	3	–	2	–	0	12	–	2	–	0
Northern Michigan	1	–	3	–	1	5	–	4	–	1
Western Illinois	1	–	3	–	1	3	–	6	–	1
Northern Iowa	0	–	5	–	0	2	–	9	–	0
$ – Conference champion; ^ – NCAA Division II playoff participant

The 1978 Eastern Illinois Panthers football team represented Eastern Illinois University during the 1978 NCAA Division II football season, and completed the 78th season of Panther football. The Panthers played their home games at O'Brien Stadium in Charleston, Illinois. The 1978 team came off a 1–10 record from the previous season. The 1978 team was led by coach Darrell Mudra. The team finished the regular season with a 9–2 record and made the NCAA Division II playoffs. The Panthers defeated Delaware, 10–9, in the National Championship Game en route to the program's first NCAA Division II Football Championship.

== Schedule ==
Date	Time	Opponent	Rank	Site	Result	Attendance	Source
September 2		Central State (OH)*		O'Brien Stadium; Charleston, IL	W 41–16	7,000	
September 9		at Butler*		Bud and Jackie Sellick Bowl; Indianapolis, IN	W 42–3	4,300	
September 16		Northern Iowa		O'Brien Stadium; Charleston, IL	W 38–22	8,500	
September 23		Northeast Missouri State*		O'Brien Stadium; Charleston, IL	W 29–12	7,000	
September 30		at Akron	No. 4	Rubber Bowl; Akron, OH	L 16–17	3,278	
October 7		at No. 4 Youngstown State	No. 8	Rayen Stadium; Youngstown, OH	L 24–40	4,360	
October 21		at No. 8 Northern Michigan		Memorial Field; Marquette, MI	W 42–34	8,602	
October 28		at Wayne State (MI)*	No. 8	Detroit, MI	W 42–34	1,800	
November 4		Illinois State*^{†}	No. 9	O'Brien Stadium; Charleston, IL (rivalry)	W 42–7	9,000	
November 11		Murray State*	No. 7	O'Brien Stadium; Charleston, IL	W 35–14	6,500	
November 18		at Western Illinois	No. 5	Hanson Field; Macomb, IL	W 40–12	7,850	
November 25	3:00 p.m.	at No. 4 UC Davis*	No. 5	Toomey Field; Davis, CA (NCAA Division II Quarterfinal)	W 35–31	8,500	
December 2		No. 2 Youngstown State*	No. 5	O'Brien Stadium; Charleston, IL (NCAA Division II Semifinal)	W 26–22		
December 9		vs. No. 3 Delaware*	No. 5	Lobo Stadium; Longview, TX (NCAA Division II Championship)	W 10–9	5,500	
*Non-conference game; ^{†}Homecoming; Rankings from Associated Press Poll released prior to the game; All times are in Central time

== Roster ==
1978 Eastern Illinois Panthers football team roster
Players
Coaches
Offense

Pos.	#	Name	Class
QB	11	Steve Turk	Jr
C	50	Jack Lafferty	Jr

Defense

Pos.	#	Name	Class
CB	44	Rich Brown	Fr
FS	48	Chris Merenowicz	So
DE	79	Steve Parker	So
LB	12	Don Pittman	So

Special teams

Pos.	#	Name	Class

Head coach

- Darrell Mudra

Coordinators/assistant coaches

Legend

- (C) Team captain
- (S) Suspended
- (I) Ineligible
- Injured
- Redshirt
