= 1978 Montana Grizzlies football team =

American college football season

1978 Montana Grizzlies football
- Conference: Big Sky Conference
- Record: 5–6 (4–2 Big Sky)
- Head coach: Gene Carlson (3rd season)
- Offensive coordinator: Dave Nickel (2nd season)
- Defensive coordinator: Pokey Allen (2nd season)
- Home stadium: Dornblaser Field

1978 Big Sky Conference football standings
	Conf.					Overall
Team	W		L		T	W		L		T
No. 7 Northern Arizona $	6	–	0	–	0	8	–	2	–	0
No. T–9 Montana State	4	–	2	–	0	8	–	2	–	0
Montana	4	–	2	–	0	5	–	6	–	0
Boise State	3	–	3	–	0	7	–	4	–	0
Weber State	2	–	4	–	0	4	–	7	–	0
Idaho	2	–	4	–	0	2	–	9	–	0
Idaho State	0	–	6	–	0	2	–	9	–	0
$ – Conference champion; Rankings from NCAA Division I-AA AP Poll

The 1978 Montana Grizzlies football team was an American football team that represented the University of Montana in the Big Sky Conference during the 1978 NCAA Division I-AA football season. In their third year under head coach Gene Carlson, the team compiled a 5–6 record.

== Schedule ==
Date	Opponent	Site	Result	Attendance	Source
September 9	Puget Sound*	Dornblaser Field; Missoula, MT	L 12–23		
September 16	at Portland State*	Civic Stadium; Portland, OR	L 16–27		
September 23	No. 9 Northern Arizona	Dornblaser Field; Missoula, MT	L 6–21	6,000	
September 30	at Weber State	Wildcat Stadium; Ogden, UT	W 27–7	8,571	
October 7	at No. 7 Boise State	Bronco Stadium; Boise, ID	W 15–7	19,580	
October 14	Idaho	Dornblaser Field; Missoula, MT (Little Brown Stein)	L 30–34	8,286	
October 21	at Idaho State	ASISU Minidome; Pocatello, ID	W 28–7	6,615	
October 28	at UNLV*	Las Vegas Silver Bowl; Whitney, NV	L 16–25	17,058	
November 4	No. T–5 Montana State	Dornblaser Field; Missoula, MT (rivalry)	W 24–8	13,044	
November 11	Northern Colorado*	Dornblaser Field; Missoula, MT	W 31–14	1,001	
November 18	at San Jose State*	Spartan Stadium; San Jose, CA	L 7–35		
*Non-conference game; Rankings from Associated Press Poll released prior to the game
