= 1978 Idaho Vandals football team =

American college football season

1978 Idaho Vandals football
- Conference: Big Sky Conference
- Record: 2–9 (2–4 Big Sky)
- Head coach: Jerry Davitch (1st season)
- Offensive coordinator: John McMahon (1st season)
- Offensive scheme: Veer
- Defensive coordinator: Greg McMackin (2nd season)
- Base defense: 5–2
- Home stadium: Idaho Stadium

1978 Big Sky Conference football standings
| | Conf. | | | | | Overall |
| Team | W | | L | | T | W | | L | | T |
|---|---|---|---|---|---|---|---|---|---|---|
| No. 7 Northern Arizona $ | 6 | – | 0 | – | 0 | 8 | – | 2 | – | 0 |
| No. T–9 Montana State | 4 | – | 2 | – | 0 | 8 | – | 2 | – | 0 |
| Montana | 4 | – | 2 | – | 0 | 5 | – | 6 | – | 0 |
| Boise State | 3 | – | 3 | – | 0 | 7 | – | 4 | – | 0 |
| Weber State | 2 | – | 4 | – | 0 | 4 | – | 7 | – | 0 |
| Idaho | 2 | – | 4 | – | 0 | 2 | – | 9 | – | 0 |
| Idaho State | 0 | – | 6 | – | 0 | 2 | – | 9 | – | 0 |
$ – Conference champion; Rankings from NCAA Division I-AA AP Poll

The 1978 Idaho Vandals football team represented the University of Idaho in the Big Sky Conference during the 1978 NCAA Division I-AA football season. Led by new head coach Jerry Davitch, the Vandals played home games at the Kibbie Dome, an indoor facility on campus in Moscow, Idaho.

With sophomore quarterbacks Jay Goodenbour and Mike McCurdy running the veer offense, the Vandals were 2–9 overall (2–4 in Big Sky, fifth). Projected starter Rocky Tuttle injured an ankle in the final scrimmage, had tendon surgery, and redshirted; as a fifth-year senior in 1979, he started as a running back and receiver.

The final win was an unplayed forfeit by Idaho State for a scheduled night game in Moscow in November. Flying from Pocatello to the Palouse on the afternoon of the game to forego lodging, one of ISU's two chartered Convair 440 aircraft had carburetor problems soon after takeoff and had to land. It carried the defensive players; the other with the offense landed safely at the Moscow-Pullman airport two hours later. After difficulties in arranging a viable makeup date, a forfeit win was awarded to the Vandals. It was the conference finale for both, and ISU finished winless in the Big Sky for the second time in three seasons.

This was the first season for the newly created Division I-AA, which the Big Sky joined. In Division I for other sports, it was previously a Division II conference for football, except for Division I member Idaho, which moved down to I-AA this season. Idaho had maintained its upper division status in the NCAA by playing Division I non-conference opponents.

Hired in January, Davitch was previously an assistant at the Air Force Academy for five seasons under longtime head coach Ben Martin, preceded by four years as a high school head coach in Tucson, Arizona.

Season tickets for the five home games cost thirty-two dollars.

== Schedule ==
| Date | Time | Opponent | Site | Result | Attendance | Source |
|---|---|---|---|---|---|---|
| September 9 | 7:00 pm | at San Jose State (Div. I-A)* | Spartan Stadium; San Jose, CA | L 14–31 | 10,011 | |
| September 16 | 1:00 pm | at Washington State (Div. I-A)* | Martin Stadium; Pullman, WA (Battle of the Palouse) | L 0–28 | 16,950 | |
| September 23 | 5:30 pm | at Wichita State (Div. I-A)* | Cessna Stadium; Wichita, KS | L 6–28 | 13,123 | |
| September 30 | 7:00 pm | No. 9 Northern Arizona | Kibbie Dome; Moscow, ID | L 29–34 | 8,200 | |
| October 7 | 7:30 pm | at UNLV (Div. I-A)* | Silver Bowl; Whitney, NV | L 14–53 | 18,944 | |
| October 14 | 1:00 pm | at Montana | Dornblaser Field; Missoula, MT (Little Brown Stein) | W 34–30 | 8,286 | |
| October 21 | 7:00 pm | No. 1 Montana State | Kibbie Dome; Moscow, ID | L 21–57 | 9,000 | |
| October 28 | 2:00 pm | Weber State^{†} | Kibbie Dome; Moscow, ID | L 6–51 | 13,500 | |
| November 4 | 12:30 pm | at Boise State | Bronco Stadium; Boise, ID (rivalry) | L 10–48 | 20,235 | |
| November 11 | 7:00 pm | Idaho State | Kibbie Dome; Moscow, ID (rivalry) | W 1–0 | Forfeit | |
| November 18 | 7:00 pm | Fresno State (Div. I-A)* | Kibbie Dome; Moscow, ID | L 28–41 | 5,600 | |
*Non-conference game; ^{†}Homecoming; Rankings from AP poll (Div. I-AA), top ten only; All times are in Pacific time

== Roster ==
1978 Idaho Vandals football team roster
Players
Coaches
Offense

| Pos. | # | Name | Class |
|---|---|---|---|
| FL | 1 | Jett Taylor | Jr |
| SE | 7 | Jack Klein | So |
| QB | 10 | Jay Goodenbour | So |
| QB | 11 | Mike McCurdy | So |
| QB | 12 | Rocky Tuttle (injured) | Sr |
| SE | 18 | Kirk Allen | Sr |
| RB | 25 | Robert Brooks | Sr |
| RB | 30 | Tim Lappano (injured) | Sr |
| RB | 32 | Glen White | So |
| RB | 33 | Terry Idler | Fr |
| RB | 35 | Glenn Ford | So |
| RB | 40 | Randy Davenport | So |
| LG | 58 | Dan Cozzetto | Sr |
| RG | 61 | Dick Wilkin | Sr |
| RT | 68 | Bryan Zimmermann | Sr |
| C | 69 | Larry Coombs | Jr |
| OL | 69 | Kyle Riddell | Jr |
| OL | 77 | Tom Randel | Sr |
| TE | 84 | Rick Mayfield | Sr |
| TE | 82 | Al Swenson | Fr |
| FL, TE | 88 | Mike Hagadone (injured) | Sr |

Defense

| Pos. | # | Name | Class |
|---|---|---|---|
| DB | 3 | Russell Davis | Fr |
| FS | 4 | Ron Powell | So |
| CB | 20 | Ron Jessie | Jr |
| SS | 24 | Rick Linehan | Sr |
| CB | 35 | Mike Keough | So |
| DE | 42 | Brian Rekofke | Sr |
| LB | 43 | Larry Barker | So |
| LB | 51 | Chris Eads | Jr |
| LB | 52 | Bob Cafferty | Sr |
| LB | 53 | Kelly Grimes | Jr |
| DT | 71 | Mark McNeal | Jr |
| NG | 75 | Monty Elder | So |
| DT | 78 | Steve Parker | Jr |
| LB | 83 | Phil Vance | Jr |
| DE | 84 | Jay Hayes | Fr |
| DE | 80 | Lloyd Williamson | Fr |

Special teams

| Pos. | # | Name | Class |
|---|---|---|---|
| P | 2 | Dion Jergo | Fr |
| PK | 5 | Jeff Wellmann | Fr |
| P | 6 | Pete O'Brien | Fr |

Head coach

- Jerry Davitch (1st year)

Coordinators/assistant coaches

- Bill Tripp (OC)
- Greg McMackin (DC)
- Fred Manuel (DB)

Legend

- (C) Team captain
- (S) Suspended
- (I) Ineligible
- Injured
- Redshirt

== All-conference ==
No Vandals were chosen for All-Big Sky first team, but seven were selected for the second team; the two picks on offense were tackle Kyle Riddell and center Larry Coombs. The five on the defense were linebacker Brian Rekofke, defensive linemen Mark McNeal and Steve Parker, and defensive backs Rick Linehan and Ron Jessie.

== NFL draft ==
No Vandals were selected in the 1979 NFL draft, which lasted 12 rounds (330 selections). One Vandal junior was later selected in the 1980 NFL draft, also 12 rounds (333 selections).

| Player | Position | Round | Overall | Franchise |
| Mark McNeal | DE | 6th | 153 | Seattle Seahawks |
