= 1978 UC Davis Aggies football team =

American college football season

1978 UC Davis Aggies football

FWC champion

NCAA Division II Quarterfinal, L 31–35 vs. Eastern Illinois
- Conference: Far Western Conference

Ranking
- AP: No. 4 (NCAA Division II)
- Record: 8–3 (5–0 FWC)
- Head coach: Jim Sochor (9th season)
- Home stadium: Toomey Field

1978 Far Western Conference football standings
	Conf.					Overall
Team	W		L		T	W		L		T
No. 4 UC Davis $^	5	–	0	–	0	8	–	3	–	0
Cal State Hayward	4	–	1	–	0	8	–	2	–	0
Humboldt State	3	–	2	–	0	5	–	6	–	0
Chico State	2	–	3	–	0	5	–	5	–	0
Sacramento State	1	–	4	–	0	1	–	9	–	0
San Francisco State	0	–	5	–	0	1	–	9	–	0
$ – Conference champion; ^ – NCAA Division II playoff participant; Rankings from Associated Press poll

The 1978 UC Davis football team represented the University of California, Davis as a member of the Far Western Conference (FWC) during the 1978 NCAA Division II football season. Led by ninth-year head coach Jim Sochor, UC Davis compiled an overall record of 8–3 with a mark of 5–0, winning the FWC for the eighth consecutive season. 1978 was the team's ninth consecutive winning season. With the 5–0 conference record, they stretched their conference winning streak to 28 games dating back to the 1973 season. The Aggies advanced to the NCAA Division II Football Championship playoffs for the second consecutive season, where they lost to eventual national champion Eastern Illinois in the first round. The team outscored its opponents 304 to 156 for the season. The Aggies played home games at Toomey Field in Davis, California.

== Schedule ==
Date	Time	Opponent	Rank	Site	Result	Attendance	Source
September 16		at Pacific (CA)*		Pacific Memorial Stadium; Stockton, CA	W 31–14	12,442	
September 23		at Nevada*		Mackay Stadium; Reno, NV	L 7–12	12,093	
September 30		at Puget Sound*		Baker Stadium; Tacoma, WA	W 28–13	3,700	
October 7		Cal State Hayward	No. 9	Toomey Field; Davis, CA	W 29–14	9,300	
October 14		at Sacramento State	No. 6	Charles C. Hughes Stadium; Sacramento, CA (rivalry)	W 39–0	6,000	
October 21		Humboldt State	No. 9	Toomey Field; Davis, CA	W 19–6	8,000	
October 28		Santa Clara*	No. 5	Toomey Field; Davis, CA	L 20–26	6,300	
November 4		at San Francisco State	No. 4	Cox Stadium; San Francisco, CA	W 40–12	2,683	
November 11		No. 3 Cal Poly*	No. 6	Toomey Field; Davis, CA (rivalry)	W 29–22	9,600	
November 18		at Chico State	No. 4	University Stadium; Chico, CA	W 31–2	4,429	
November 25	1:00 p.m.	No. 5 Eastern Illinois*	No. 4	Toomey Field; Davis, CA (NCAA Division II Quarterfinal)	L 31–35	8,500	
*Non-conference game; Rankings from Associated Press Poll released prior to the game; All times are in Pacific time

== NFL draft ==
The following UC Davis Aggies players were selected in the 1979 NFL draft.

Player	Position	Round	Overall	NFL team
Casey Merrill	Defensive End - Defensive tackle	5	113	Cincinnati Bengals
Mike Moroski	Quarterback	6	154	Atlanta Falcons
Rich Martini	Wide receiver	7	190	Oakland Raiders
