= 1978 Jacksonville State Gamecocks football team =

American college football season

1978 Jacksonville State Gamecocks football

GSC champion

NCAA Division II First Round, L 27–42 at Delaware
- Conference: Gulf South Conference
- Record: 7–3 (6–1 GSC)
- Head coach: Jim Fuller (2nd season)
- Defensive coordinator: Bill Shaw (2nd season)
- Home stadium: Paul Snow Stadium

1978 Gulf South Conference football standings
	Conf.					Overall
Team	W		L		T	W		L		T
No. 7 Jacksonville State $	6	–	1	–	0	7	–	3	–	0
Southeastern Louisiana	5	–	1	–	1	7	–	3	–	1
Troy State	5	–	2	–	0	8	–	2	–	0
Nicholls State	5	–	2	–	0	5	–	6	–	0
North Alabama	4	–	2	–	1	7	–	2	–	1
Mississippi College	3	–	4	–	0	5	–	5	–	0
Delta State	2	–	6	–	0	3	–	7	–	0
Livingston	1	–	6	–	0	3	–	7	–	0
Tennessee–Martin	0	–	7	–	0	2	–	8	–	0
$ – Conference champion; Rankings from AP Poll

The 1978 Jacksonville State Gamecocks football team represented Jacksonville State University as a member of the Gulf South Conference (GSC) during the 1978 NCAA Division II football season. Led by second-year head coach Jim Fuller, the Gamecocks compiled an overall record of 7–3 with a mark of 6–1 in conference play, and finished as GSC champion. In the playoffs, Jacksonville State were defeated by Delaware in the first round.

== Schedule ==
Date	Opponent	Rank	Site	Result	Attendance	Source
September 9	vs. Alabama A&M*		Legion Field; Birmingham, AL	W 24–23	13,351	
September 16	Nicholls State		Paul Snow Stadium; Jacksonville, AL	L 17–19	12,000	
September 23	at Tennessee–Martin		Pacer Stadium; Martin, TN	W 44–15	6,814	
September 30	Southeastern Louisiana	No. 10	Paul Snow Stadium; Jacksonville, AL	W 10–7	10,000	
October 14	at Chattanooga*	No. 9	Chamberlain Field; Chattanooga, TN	L 21–28	10,501	
October 28	Delta State	No. 10	Paul Snow Stadium; Jacksonville, AL	W 38–3	11,000	
November 4	at Livingston	No. 10	Tiger Stadium; Livingston, AL	W 41–21	5,500	
November 11	No. 5 Troy State	No. 9	Paul Snow Stadium; Jacksonville, AL (rivalry)	W 42–21	11,500	
November 18	North Alabama	No. 7	Paul Snow Stadium; Jacksonville, AL	W 19–14	7,500	
November 25	at No. 3 Delaware*	No. 7	Delaware Stadium; Newark, DE (NCAA Division II Quarterfinal)	L 27–42	11,235	
*Non-conference game; Rankings from AP Poll released prior to the game
