= 1978 North Dakota State Bison football team =

American college football season

1978 North Dakota State Bison football
- Conference: North Central Conference
- Record: 6–4 (3–3 NCC)
- Head coach: Jim Wacker (3rd season)
- Home stadium: Dacotah Field

1978 North Central Conference football standings
	Conf.					Overall
Team	W		L		T	W		L		T
South Dakota * $	5	–	0	–	1	7	–	4	–	0
No. 6 Nebraska–Omaha * ^	4	–	1	–	1	8	–	3	–	0
North Dakota State	3	–	3	–	0	6	–	4	–	0
North Dakota	3	–	3	–	0	5	–	5	–	0
South Dakota State	3	–	3	–	0	5	–	6	–	0
Augustana (SD)	2	–	4	–	0	4	–	5	–	0
Morningside	0	–	6	–	0	2	–	8	–	0
$ – Conference champion; ^ – NCAA Division II playoff participant; * – Nebraska–Omaha and South Dakota split two head-to-head games, which counted as a tie for each team in the conference standings.; Rankings from AP Poll

The 1978 North Dakota State Bison football team was an American football team that represented North Dakota State University during the 1978 NCAA Division II football season as a member of the North Central Conference. In their third year under head coach Jim Wacker, the team compiled a 6–4 record.

== Schedule ==
Date	Opponent	Rank	Site	Result	Attendance	Source
September 2	Northern Arizona*		Dacotah Field; Fargo, ND	W 23–7	8,100	
September 9	at Weber State*		Stewart Stadium; Ogden, UT	W 49–28	12,062	
September 16	at Montana State*		Reno H. Sales Stadium; Bozeman, MT	L 18–28	7,650	
September 23	at Augustana (SD)		Howard Wood Field; Sioux Falls, SD	W 45–17	3,992	
September 30	South Dakota	No. 8	Dacotah Field; Fargo, ND	L 14–17	10,050	
October 7	at Nebraska–Omaha		Al F. Caniglia Field; Omaha, NE	L 12–19	8,200	
October 14	Northern Iowa*^{†}		Dacotah Field; Fargo, ND	W 42–14	9,000	
October 21	at North Dakota		Memorial Stadium; Grand Forks, ND (Nickel Trophy)	L 21–24	14,300	
October 28	Morningside		Dacotah Field; Fargo, ND	W 56–7	3,100	
November 4	at South Dakota State		Coughlin–Alumni Stadium; Brookings, SD (rivalry)	W 28–26	3,129	
*Non-conference game; ^{†}Homecoming; Rankings from AP Poll released prior to the game
