= 1978 Cal Poly Mustangs football team =

American college football season

1978 Cal Poly Mustangs football

CCAA champion (unofficial)

NCAA Division II Quarterfinal, L 0–17 vs. Winston-Salem State
- Conference: California Collegiate Athletic Association

Ranking
- AP: No. 8 (NCAA Division II)
- Record: 7–3 (2–0 CCAA)
- Head coach: Joe Harper (11th season)
- Home stadium: Mustang Stadium

1978 California Collegiate Athletic Association football standings
	Conf.					Overall
Team	W		L		T	W		L		T
No. 8 Cal Poly $^	2	–	0	–	0	7	–	3	–	0
Cal Poly Pomona	1	–	1	–	0	3	–	7	–	0
Cal State Northridge	0	–	2	–	0	5	–	5	–	0
$ – Conference champion; ^ – NCAA Division II playoff participant; The conference championship was unofficial because the CCAA had only three members.; Rankings from Associated Press poll

The 1978 Cal Poly Mustangs football team represented California Polytechnic State University, San Luis Obispo as a member of the California Collegiate Athletic Association (CCAA) during the 1978 NCAA Division II football season. Led by 11th-year head coach Joe Harper, Cal Poly compiled an overall record of 7–3 with a mark of 2–0 in conference play, winning the CCAA title for the third consecutive season. The conference title was unofficial as the CCAA had only three members. The Mustangs advanced to the NCAA Division II Football Championship playoffs for the first time, where they lost to Winston-Salem State in the quarterfinals. Cal Poly played home games at Mustang Stadium in San Luis Obispo, California.

== Schedule ==
Date	Opponent	Rank	Site	Result	Attendance	Source
September 16	Sacramento State*		Mustang Stadium; San Luis Obispo, CA	W 52–6	2,700	
September 23	Cal State Fullerton*		Mustang Stadium; San Luis Obispo, CA	W 41–27	5,430	
September 30	at Fresno State*	No. 9	Ratcliffe Stadium; Fresno, California	W 24–12	12,287	
October 7	Portland State*	No. 3	Mustang Stadium; San Luis Obispo, CA	W 56–20	6,025	
October 14	at Northern Colorado*	No. 2	Jackson Field; Greeley, CO	L 10–15	2,087	
October 21	Cal State Northridge	No. 4	Mustang Stadium; San Luis Obispo, CA	W 38–17	6,180	
November 4	at Cal Poly Pomona	No. 4	Kellogg Field; Pomona, CA	W 35–8	3,500	
November 11	at No. 6 UC Davis*	No. 3	Toomey Field; Davis, CA (rivalry)	L 22–29	9,600	
November 18	Boise State*	No. 8	Mustang Stadium; San Luis Obispo, CA	W 7–3	7,430	
November 25	No. 1 Winston-Salem State*	No. 8	Bowman Gray Stadium; Winston-Salem, NC (NCAA Division II Quarterfinal)	L 0–17	8,500	
*Non-conference game; Rankings from Associated Press Poll released prior to the game
