= 1978 Northern Iowa Panthers football team =

American college football season

1978 Northern Iowa Panthers football
- Conference: Association of Mid-Continent Universities
- Record: 2–9 (0–5 Mid-Con)
- Head coach: Stan Sheriff (19th season)
- Defensive coordinator: Dennis Remmert (8th season)
- Home stadium: UNI-Dome

1978 Association of Mid-Continent Universities football standings
	Conf.					Overall
Team	W		L		T	W		L		T
Youngstown State $^	5	–	0	–	0	10	–	2	–	0
Akron	4	–	1	–	0	6	–	5	–	0
Eastern Illinois ^	3	–	2	–	0	12	–	2	–	0
Northern Michigan	1	–	3	–	1	5	–	4	–	1
Western Illinois	1	–	3	–	1	3	–	6	–	1
Northern Iowa	0	–	5	–	0	2	–	9	–	0
$ – Conference champion; ^ – NCAA Division II playoff participant

The 1978 Northern Iowa Panthers football team was an American football team that represented the University of Northern Iowa as a member of the Association of Mid-Continent Universities (Mid-Con) during the 1978 NCAA Division II football season. In its 19th season under head coach Stan Sheriff, the team compiled a 2–9 record (0–5 in conference games) and finished in last place out of six teams in the AMCU.

The team's statistical leaders included sophomore running back Kelly Ellis (742 rushing yards), senior quarterback Terry Allen (1,113 passing yards, 60 points scored), and freshman wide receiver Ron Hadley (358 receiving yards). Offensive tackle Paul Christensen was the only Northern Iowa player named to the 1978 all-Mid-Con football team.

The team played its home games at the UNI-Dome in Cedar Falls, Iowa.

== Schedule ==
Date	Opponent	Site	Result	Attendance	Source
September 2	Wisconsin–Whitewater*	UNI-Dome; Cedar Falls, IA	W 15–12	8,500	
September 9	Youngstown State	UNI-Dome; Cedar Falls, IA	L 14–31	9,600	
September 16	at Eastern Illinois	O'Brien Field; Charleston, IL	L 22–38	8,500	
September 23	at Weber State*	Wildcat Stadium; Ogden, UT	L 0–35	7,486	
September 30	at Nebraska–Omaha*	Al F. Caniglia Field; Omaha, NE	L 14–17	10,200	
October 7	North Dakota*	UNI-Dome; Cedar Falls, IA	W 35–17	8,700	
October 14	at North Dakota State*	Dacotah Field; Fargo, ND	L 14–42	9,000	
October 21	Western Illinois	UNI-Dome; Cedar Falls, IA	L 7–21	10,500	
October 28	South Dakota State*	UNI-Dome; Cedar Falls, IA	L 9–10	8,200	
November 11	Northern Michigan	UNI-Dome; Cedar Falls, IA	L 18–20	11,000	
November 18	at Akron	Rubber Bowl; Akron, OH	L 28–39	5,500–5,522	
*Non-conference game
