= 1978 Troy State Trojans football team =

American college football season

1978 Troy State Trojans football
- Conference: Gulf South Conference
- Record: 7–2 (5–2 GSC)
- Head coach: Charlie Bradshaw (3rd season)
- Home stadium: Veterans Memorial Stadium

1978 Gulf South Conference football standings
| | Conf. | | | | | Overall |
| Team | W | | L | | T | W | | L | | T |
|---|---|---|---|---|---|---|---|---|---|---|
| No. 7 Jacksonville State $ | 6 | – | 1 | – | 0 | 7 | – | 3 | – | 0 |
| Southeastern Louisiana | 5 | – | 1 | – | 1 | 7 | – | 3 | – | 1 |
| Troy State | 5 | – | 2 | – | 0 | 8 | – | 2 | – | 0 |
| Nicholls State | 5 | – | 2 | – | 0 | 5 | – | 6 | – | 0 |
| North Alabama | 4 | – | 2 | – | 1 | 7 | – | 2 | – | 1 |
| Mississippi College | 3 | – | 4 | – | 0 | 5 | – | 5 | – | 0 |
| Delta State | 2 | – | 6 | – | 0 | 3 | – | 7 | – | 0 |
| Livingston | 1 | – | 6 | – | 0 | 3 | – | 7 | – | 0 |
| Tennessee–Martin | 0 | – | 7 | – | 0 | 2 | – | 8 | – | 0 |
$ – Conference champion; Rankings from AP Poll

The 1978 Troy State Trojans football team represented Troy State University (now known as Troy University) as a member of the Gulf South Conference (GSC) during the 1978 NCAA Division II football season. Led by third-year head coach Charlie Bradshaw, the Trojans compiled an overall record of 7–2 with a mark of 5–2 in conference play, and finished tied for third in the GSC.

== Schedule ==
| Date | Opponent | Rank | Site | Result | Attendance | Source |
|---|---|---|---|---|---|---|
| September 16 | Eastern Kentucky* | | Veterans Memorial Stadium; Troy, AL | W 16–10 | 7,000 | |
| September 23 | at Nicholls State | | John L. Guidry Stadium; Thibodaux, LA | W 16–6 | 7,325 | |
| September 30 | Livingston | | Veterans Memorial Stadium; Troy, AL | W 38–7 | 7,100 | |
| October 7 | at Southeastern Louisiana | No. 7 | Strawberry Stadium; Hammond, LA | L 7–45 | 7,500 | |
| October 14 | Delta State | | Veterans Memorial Stadium; Troy, AL | W 21–6 | 5,250 | |
| October 21 | at North Alabama | No. 10 | Braly Municipal Stadium; Florence, AL | W 17–0 | 8,000 | |
| October 28 | Tennessee Tech* | No. 7 | Veterans Memorial Stadium; Troy, AL | W 45–0 | 6,850 | |
| November 4 | Mississippi College | No. 5 | Veterans Memorial Stadium; Troy, AL | W 27–16 | 9,000 | |
| November 11 | at No. 9 Jacksonville State | No. 5 | Paul Snow Stadium; Jacksonville, AL (rivalry) | L 21–42 | 11,500 | |
*Non-conference game; Rankings from AP Poll released prior to the game
