= 1978 Idaho State Bengals football team =

American college football season

1978 Idaho State Bengals football
- Conference: Big Sky Conference
- Record: 2–9 (0–6 Big Sky)
- Head coach: Bud Hake (2nd season)
- Home stadium: ASISU Minidome

1978 Big Sky Conference football standings
	Conf.					Overall
Team	W		L		T	W		L		T
No. 7 Northern Arizona $	6	–	0	–	0	8	–	2	–	0
No. T–9 Montana State	4	–	2	–	0	8	–	2	–	0
Montana	4	–	2	–	0	5	–	6	–	0
Boise State	3	–	3	–	0	7	–	4	–	0
Weber State	2	–	4	–	0	4	–	7	–	0
Idaho	2	–	4	–	0	2	–	9	–	0
Idaho State	0	–	6	–	0	2	–	9	–	0
$ – Conference champion; Rankings from NCAA Division I-AA AP Poll

The 1978 Idaho State Bengals football team represented Idaho State University as a member of the Big Sky Conference during the 1978 NCAA Division I-AA football season. Led by second-year head coach Bud Hake, the Bengals compiled an overall record of 2–9, with a mark of 0–6 in conference play, and finished seventh in the Big Sky.

== Schedule ==
Date	Opponent	Site	Result	Attendance	Source
September 3	vs. Utah State*	Hankyu Nishinomiya Stadium; Nishinomiya, Japan	L 0–10	25,000	
September 9	at Utah*	Robert Rice Stadium; Salt Lake City, UT	L 0–56	25,822	
September 16	at Northern Arizona	NAU Skydome; Flagstaff, AZ	L 14–34		
September 23	Portland State*	ASISU Minidome; Pocatello, ID	W 27–13		
October 7	at Northern Colorado*	Jackson Field; Greeley, CO	W 9–7		
October 14	at Montana State	Sales Stadium; Bozeman, MT	L 12–23	13,650	
October 21	Montana	ASISU Minidome; Pocatello, ID	L 7–28	6,615	
October 28	Boise State	ASISU Minidome; Pocatello, ID	L 14–16	6,983	
November 4	at Weber State	Wildcat Stadium; Ogden, UT	L 12–34	7,021	
November 11	at Idaho	Kibbie Dome; Moscow, ID (rivalry)	L 0–1 (Forfeit)		
November 18	No. 1 Nevada*	ASISU Minidome; Pocatello, ID	L 0–37		
*Non-conference game; Rankings from Associated Press Poll released prior to the game
