= 1973 Akron Zips football team =

American college football season

1973 Akron Zips football
- Conference: Independent
- Record: 6–5
- Head coach: Jim Dennison (1st season)
- Captain: John Maher; Bob Holian
- Home stadium: Rubber Bowl

1973 NCAA Division II independents football records
	Conf.			Overall
Team	W	L	T	W		L		T
No. 1 Tennessee State		–		10	–	0	–	0
No. 9 Hawaii		–		9	–	2	–	0
Nebraska–Omaha		–		7	–	2	–	1
Trinity (TX)		–		8	–	3	–	0
UNLV		–		8	–	3	–	0
No. 13 Delaware ^		–		8	–	4	–	0
Western Carolina		–		6	–	3	–	1
Central Michigan		–		7	–	4	–	0
Nevada		–		7	–	4	–	0
Western Illinois		–		7	–	4	–	0
Milwaukee		–		6	–	4	–	1
Eastern Michigan		–		6	–	4	–	0
American International		–		5	–	4	–	0
Akron		–		6	–	5	–	0
Central State (OH)		–		6	–	5	–	0
Ball State		–		5	–	5	–	1
Wayne State (MI)		–		5	–	5	–	0
Drexel		–		4	–	4	–	0
Bucknell		–		3	–	4	–	2
Northeast Louisiana		–		3	–	5	–	2
Santa Clara		–		4	–	6	–	0
Youngstown State		–		4	–	6	–	0
Arkansas–Pine Bluff		–		3	–	5	–	1
Chattanooga		–		4	–	7	–	0
Indiana State		–		4	–	7	–	0
Northeastern		–		3	–	6	–	0
Kentucky State		–		3	–	8	–	0
Northern Michigan		–		2	–	7	–	1
Illinois College		–		2	–	7	–	0
Eastern Illinois		–		2	–	9	–	0
Portland State		–		1	–	10	–	0
^ – NCAA Division II playoff participant; Rankings from AP small college poll

The 1973 Akron Zips football team represented Akron University in the 1973 NCAA Division II football season as an independent. Led by first-year head coach Jim Dennison, the Zips played their home games at the Rubber Bowl in Akron, Ohio. They finished the season with a record of 6–5 and outscored their opponents 289–203.

== Schedule ==
Date	Time	Opponent	Site	Result	Attendance	Source
September 8		at Delaware	Delaware Stadium; Newark, DE	L 24–45	18,640	
September 15		Butler	Rubber Bowl; Akron, OH	W 51–19	37,484	
September 22		at Temple	Temple Stadium; Philadelphia, PA	L 33–47	9,051	
September 29		Ball State	Rubber Bowl; Akron, OH	L 14–16	9,755	
October 6	7:30 p.m.	at Tampa	Tampa Stadium; Tampa, FL	L 7–21	12,358	
October 13		at Northern Michigan	Memorial Field; Marquette, MI	W 31–7	6,455	
October 20		Youngstown State	Rubber Bowl; Akron, OH (Steel Tire)	W 31–7	10,935	
October 27	2:31 p.m.	at Southern Illinois	McAndrew Stadium; Carbondale, IL	L 13–14	11,000	
November 3		Indiana State	Rubber Bowl; Akron, OH	W 31–14	5,264	
November 10		at Western Illinois	Hanson Field; Macomb, IL	W 12–7	14,200	
November 17		Gustavus Adolphus	Rubber Bowl; Akron, OH	W 42–7	5,863	
All times are in Eastern time
