= 1978 Montana State Bobcats football team =

American college football season

1978 Montana State Bobcats football
- Conference: Big Sky Conference
- Record: 8–2 (4–2 Big Sky)
- Head coach: Sonny Lubick (1st season)
- Home stadium: Sales Stadium

1978 Big Sky Conference football standings
	Conf.					Overall
Team	W		L		T	W		L		T
No. 7 Northern Arizona $	6	–	0	–	0	8	–	2	–	0
No. T–9 Montana State	4	–	2	–	0	8	–	2	–	0
Montana	4	–	2	–	0	5	–	6	–	0
Boise State	3	–	3	–	0	7	–	4	–	0
Weber State	2	–	4	–	0	4	–	7	–	0
Idaho	2	–	4	–	0	2	–	9	–	0
Idaho State	0	–	6	–	0	2	–	9	–	0
$ – Conference champion; Rankings from NCAA Division I-AA AP Poll

The 1978 Montana State Bobcats football team was an American football team that represented Montana State University in the Big Sky Conference during the 1978 NCAA Division I-AA football season. In their first season under head coach Sonny Lubick, the Bobcats compiled an 8–2 record (4–2 against Big Sky opponents) and tied for second place in the Big Sky.

== Schedule ==
Date	Opponent	Rank	Site	Result	Attendance	Source
September 9	at North Dakota*		Memorial Stadium; Fargo, ND	W 21–13	11,700	
September 16	North Dakota State*		Sales Stadium; Bozeman, MT	W 28–18	7,650	
September 23	Texas A&I*	No. 6	Sales Stadium; Bozeman, MT	W 42–21		
September 30	No. 3 Boise State	No. 6	Sales Stadium; Bozeman, MT	W 31–29	12,850	
October 7	at Weber State	No. 2	Wildcat Stadium; Ogden, UT	W 21–14	7,891	
October 14	Idaho State^{†}	No. 2	Sales Stadium; Bozeman, MT	W 23–12	13,650	
October 21	at Idaho	No. 1	Kibbie Dome; Moscow, ID	W 57–21	9,000	
October 28	Northern Arizona	No. 1	Sales Stadium; Bozeman, MT	L 22–43		
November 4	at Montana	No. T–5	Sales Stadium; Bozeman, MT (rivalry)	L 8–24	13,044	
November 11	at Fresno State*		Ratcliffe Stadium; Fresno, CA	W 35–14	7,258	
*Non-conference game; ^{†}Homecoming; Rankings from Associated Press Poll released prior to the game
