= 1978 NCAA Division II football season =

American college football season

- Regular season: August – November 1978
- Playoffs: December 1978
- National Championship: Lobo Stadium; Longview, TX
- Champion: Eastern Illinois

The 1978 NCAA Division II football season, part of college football in the United States organized by the National Collegiate Athletic Association at the Division II level, began in August 1978, and concluded with the NCAA Division II Football Championship in December 1978 at Lobo Stadium in Longview, Texas. The Eastern Illinois Panthers defeated the Delaware Fightin' Blue Hens, 10–9, to win their first Division II national title.

== Conference realignment ==
=== Conference changes ===
- Four conferences, the Big Sky Conference, Mid-Eastern Athletic Conference, Ohio Valley Conference, and Yankee Conference, transitioned from Division II to the newly-established Division I-AA level of college football. All of their members, alongside seven independents, departed at the same time, a total of 35 schools in all.
- This was the first season for the Mid-Continent Conference, which was formed by six schools from Illinois, Iowa, Michigan, and Ohio.
- This was the first season for the Heartland Collegiate Conference (HCC), which was formed by eight schools from Kentucky, Indiana, and Ohio. Five of its members were formerly in the Indiana Collegiate Conference, which disbanded upon creation of the HCC.

=== Membership changes ===
School	1977 Conference	1978 Conference
Akron	D-II Independent	Mid-Continent
Bucknell	D-II Independent	I-AA Independent
Cal State Los Angeles	D-II Independent	Dropped program
Eastern Illinois	D-II Independent	Mid-Continent
Lafayette	D-II Independent	I-AA Independent
Lehigh	D-II Independent	I-AA Independent
Nevada	D-II Independent	I-AA Independent
Northeastern	D-II Independent	I-AA Independent
Northern Colorado	GPAC (NAIA)	North Central
Northern Iowa	North Central	Mid-Continent
Northern Michigan	D-II Independent	Mid-Continent
Portland State	D-II Independent	I-AA Independent
UNLV	D-II Independent	I-A Independent
Western Illinois	D-II Independent	Mid-Continent
Youngstown State	D-II Independent	Mid-Continent

== Conference standings ==
1978 Association of Mid-Continent Universities football standings
	Conf.					Overall
Team	W		L		T	W		L		T
Youngstown State $^	5	–	0	–	0	10	–	2	–	0
Akron	4	–	1	–	0	6	–	5	–	0
Eastern Illinois ^	3	–	2	–	0	12	–	2	–	0
Northern Michigan	1	–	3	–	1	5	–	4	–	1
Western Illinois	1	–	3	–	1	3	–	6	–	1
Northern Iowa	0	–	5	–	0	2	–	9	–	0
$ – Conference champion; ^ – NCAA Division II playoff participant

1978 California Collegiate Athletic Association football standings
	Conf.					Overall
Team	W		L		T	W		L		T
No. 8 Cal Poly $^	2	–	0	–	0	7	–	3	–	0
Cal Poly Pomona	1	–	1	–	0	3	–	7	–	0
Cal State Northridge	0	–	2	–	0	5	–	5	–	0
$ – Conference champion; ^ – NCAA Division II playoff participant; The conference championship was unofficial because the CCAA had only three members.; Rankings from Associated Press poll

1978 Central Intercollegiate Athletic Association football standings
	Conf.					Overall
Team	W		L		T	W		L		T
No. 1 Winston-Salem State $^	8	–	0	–	0	11	–	1	–	0
Virginia Union	5	–	2	–	1	7	–	4	–	1
Fayetteville State	5	–	2	–	1	6	–	4	–	1
Norfolk State	5	–	3	–	0	6	–	4	–	0
Virginia State	5	–	3	–	0	5	–	6	–	0
Elizabeth City State	4	–	3	–	1	5	–	4	–	1
Livingstone	4	–	3	–	1	5	–	4	–	1
Hampton	4	–	4	–	0	5	–	6	–	0
Johnson C. Smith	1	–	7	–	0	1	–	10	–	0
Saint Paul's (VA)	1	–	7	–	0	1	–	10	–	0
Shaw	0	–	8	–	0	0	–	11	–	0
$ – Conference champion; ^ – NCAA Division II playoff participant; Rankings from NCAA Division II AP Poll

1978 Far Western Conference football standings
	Conf.					Overall
Team	W		L		T	W		L		T
No. 4 UC Davis $^	5	–	0	–	0	8	–	3	–	0
Cal State Hayward	4	–	1	–	0	8	–	2	–	0
Humboldt State	3	–	2	–	0	5	–	6	–	0
Chico State	2	–	3	–	0	5	–	5	–	0
Sacramento State	1	–	4	–	0	1	–	9	–	0
San Francisco State	0	–	5	–	0	1	–	9	–	0
$ – Conference champion; ^ – NCAA Division II playoff participant; Rankings from Associated Press poll

1978 Great Lakes Intercollegiate Athletic Conference football standings
	Conf.					Overall
Team	W		L		T	W		L		T
No. 4 Grand Valley State $^	5	–	0	–	0	9	–	3	–	0
Wayne State (MI)	4	–	1	–	0	5	–	4	–	0
Northwood	2	–	3	–	0	5	–	4	–	0
Saginaw Valley State	1	–	3	–	1	4	–	5	–	1
Ferris State	1	–	3	–	1	3	–	5	–	2
Hillsdale	1	–	4	–	0	5	–	6	–	0
$ – Conference champion; ^ – NAIA Division I playoff participant; Rankings from NAIA Division I poll

1978 Gulf South Conference football standings
	Conf.					Overall
Team	W		L		T	W		L		T
No. 7 Jacksonville State $	6	–	1	–	0	7	–	3	–	0
Southeastern Louisiana	5	–	1	–	1	7	–	3	–	1
Troy State	5	–	2	–	0	8	–	2	–	0
Nicholls State	5	–	2	–	0	5	–	6	–	0
North Alabama	4	–	2	–	1	7	–	2	–	1
Mississippi College	3	–	4	–	0	5	–	5	–	0
Delta State	2	–	6	–	0	3	–	7	–	0
Livingston	1	–	6	–	0	3	–	7	–	0
Tennessee–Martin	0	–	7	–	0	2	–	8	–	0
$ – Conference champion; Rankings from AP Poll

1978 Heartland Collegiate Conference standings
	Conf.					Overall
Team	W		L		T	W		L		T
Indiana Central $	4	–	2	–	0	6	–	3	–	0
Valparaiso	3	–	2	–	0	5	–	4	–	0
Saint Joseph's (IN)	3	–	2	–	0	5	–	4	–	1
Butler	3	–	2	–	0	5	–	5	–	0
Evansville	2	–	3	–	0	2	–	9	–	0
Franklin (IN)	1	–	6	–	0	1	–	9	–	0
Georgetown (KY) *	1	–	1	–	0	5	–	4	–	0
Ashland *	1	–	0	–	0	2	–	8	–	0
$ – Conference champion; * – ineligible for conference title

1978 Mid-Eastern Athletic Conference football standings
	Conf.					Overall
Team	W		L		T	W		L		T
No. 6 South Carolina State $	5	–	0	–	1	8	–	2	–	1
North Carolina A&T	4	–	2	–	0	6	–	6	–	0
Delaware State	3	–	3	–	0	3	–	7	–	0
Morgan State	2	–	3	–	1	4	–	6	–	1
Howard	2	–	4	–	0	4	–	6	–	0
Maryland Eastern Shore	2	–	4	–	0	3	–	8	–	0
North Carolina Central	2	–	4	–	0	3	–	8	–	0
$ – Conference champion; The conference was a hybrid of NCAA Division I-AA and Division II programs. Morgan State, Maryland-Eastern Shore, and North Carolina Central were classified as NCAA Division II. All the other teams were Division I-AA.; Rankings from Associated Press poll

1978 Missouri Intercollegiate Athletic Association football standings
	Conf.					Overall
Team	W		L		T	W		L		T
SW Missouri State $	6	–	0	–	0	8	–	3	–	0
NE Missouri State	5	–	1	–	0	6	–	4	–	1
Missouri-Rolla	4	–	2	–	0	8	–	3	–	0
SE Missouri State	2	–	4	–	0	6	–	5	–	0
Lincoln (MO)	2	–	4	–	0	3	–	8	–	0
Central Missouri State	2	–	4	–	0	2	–	8	–	0
NW Missouri State	0	–	6	–	0	0	–	11	–	0
$ – Conference champion; ^ – NCAA Division II playoff participant

1978 North Central Conference football standings
	Conf.					Overall
Team	W		L		T	W		L		T
South Dakota * $	5	–	0	–	1	7	–	4	–	0
No. 6 Nebraska–Omaha * ^	4	–	1	–	1	8	–	3	–	0
North Dakota State	3	–	3	–	0	6	–	4	–	0
North Dakota	3	–	3	–	0	5	–	5	–	0
South Dakota State	3	–	3	–	0	5	–	6	–	0
Augustana (SD)	2	–	4	–	0	4	–	5	–	0
Morningside	0	–	6	–	0	2	–	8	–	0
$ – Conference champion; ^ – NCAA Division II playoff participant; * – Nebraska–Omaha and South Dakota split two head-to-head games, which counted as a tie for each team in the conference standings.; Rankings from AP Poll

1978 Minnesota Intercollegiate Athletic Conference football standings
	Conf.					Overall
Team	W		L		T	W		L		T
No. 1 Concordia–Moorhead * +	7	–	1	–	0	11	–	1	–	0
St. Olaf +^	7	–	1	–	0	9	–	2	–	0
No. 15 Gustavus Adolphus	6	–	2	–	0	8	–	2	–	0
No. T–20 Saint John's (MN)	5	–	3	–	0	6	–	3	–	0
St. Thomas (MN)	4	–	4	–	0	5	–	4	–	0
Hamline	3	–	4	–	1	5	–	4	–	1
Augsburg	2	–	5	–	1	3	–	6	–	1
Bethel (MN)	1	–	7	–	0	2	–	8	–	0
Macalester	0	–	8	–	0	0	–	9	–	0
+ – Conference co-champions; ^ – NCAA Division III playoff participant; * – NAIA Division II playoff participant; Rankings from NAIA Division II poll

1978 Pennsylvania State Athletic Conference football standings
	Conf.					Overall
Team	W		L		T	W		L		T
East Division
East Stroudsburg xy$	5	–	0	–	0	10	–	1	–	0
Cheyney	4	–	1	–	0	6	–	3	–	0
Bloomsburg	3	–	2	–	0	6	–	4	–	0
Millersville	2	–	3	–	0	6	–	3	–	0
Kutztown	1	–	4	–	0	2	–	7	–	0
Mansfield	0	–	5	–	0	2	–	8	–	0
West Division
No. 17 Clarion xy	5	–	1	–	0	8	–	3	–	0
Shippensburg x	5	–	1	–	0	7	–	3	–	0
Slippery Rock	4	–	2	–	0	6	–	3	–	0
Edinboro	3	–	3	–	0	3	–	6	–	1
Indiana (PA)	2	–	4	–	0	4	–	5	–	1
California (PA)	1	–	4	–	1	2	–	7	–	1
Lock Haven	0	–	5	–	1	1	–	8	–	1
Championship: East Stroudsburg 49, Clarion 4
$ – Conference champion; x – Division champion/co-champions; y – Championship game participant; Shippensburg was ineligible for conference title game.; Rankings from NAIA Division I poll

1978 Southern Intercollegiate Athletic Conference football standings
	Conf.					Overall
Team	W		L		T	W		L		T
Division I
No. 3 Florida A&M x^	5	–	0	–	0	12	–	1	–	0
Bethune–Cookman	3	–	2	–	0	7	–	3	–	1
Alabama A&M	4	–	1	–	0	7	–	4	–	0
Morris Brown	4	–	4	–	0	5	–	5	–	0
Albany State	3	–	3	–	1	4	–	5	–	1
Tuskegee	3	–	3	–	0	3	–	7	–	0
Division II
Clark x	7	–	2	–	0	7	–	2	–	0
Fort Valley State	4	–	3	–	2	6	–	3	–	2
Knoxville	5	–	2	–	0	6	–	4	–	0
Morehouse	4	–	5	–	0	4	–	5	–	0
Savannah State	4	–	5	–	0	4	–	6	–	0
Miles	2	–	5	–	1	2	–	6	–	1
Lane	1	–	4	–	2	1	–	5	–	2
x – Division champion/co-champions; ^ – NCAA Division I-AA playoff participant; Rankings from Associated Press poll

1978 Southwestern Athletic Conference football standings
	Conf.					Overall
Team	W		L		T	W		L		T
Grambling State $	5	–	0	–	1	9	–	1	–	1
No. 2 Jackson State ^	5	–	1	–	0	10	–	2	–	0
Mississippi Valley State	3	–	2	–	1	6	–	3	–	1
Alcorn State	2	–	3	–	1	5	–	4	–	1
Southern	2	–	4	–	0	4	–	7	–	0
Texas Southern	1	–	4	–	1	3	–	7	–	1
Prairie View A&M	1	–	5	–	0	3	–	7	–	0
$ – Conference champion; ^ – NCAA Division I-AA playoff participant; The conference was a hybrid of NCAA Division I-AA and II programs. Mississippi Valley State and Prairie View were classified as NCAA Division II for the 1978 season. All the other teams were Division I-AA.; Rankings from Associated Press poll

1978 West Virginia Intercollegiate Athletic Conference football standings
	Conf.					Overall
Team	W		L		T	W		L		T
Northern Division
Shepherd xy	6	–	3	–	0	7	–	4	–	0
West Virginia Wesleyan	6	–	3	–	0	6	–	3	–	0
Fairmont State	5	–	4	–	0	5	–	4	–	1
Salem	4	–	5	–	0	4	–	6	–	0
West Liberty State	2	–	7	–	0	2	–	8	–	0
Southern Division
No. 6 Concord xy$^	8	–	1	–	0	10	–	2	–	0
West Virginia Tech	6	–	3	–	0	6	–	3	–	0
West Virginia State	6	–	3	–	0	6	–	4	–	0
Glenville State	1	–	7	–	0	2	–	7	–	0
Bluefield State	0	–	9	–	0	0	–	10	–	0
Championship: Concord 35, Shepherd 14
$ – Conference champion; x – Division champion/co-champions; y – Championship game participant; ^ – NAIA Division I playoff participant Conference standings based on power ratings; Rankings from NAIA Division I poll

1978 NCAA Division II independents football records
	Conf.			Overall
Team	W	L	T	W		L		T
No. 9 American International		–		6	–	2	–	1
No. 3 Delaware ^		–		10	–	4	–	0
Kentucky State		–		7	–	2	–	1
Santa Clara		–		5	–	6	–	0
Arkansas–Pine Bluff		–		4	–	6	–	0
Northern Colorado		–		4	–	6	–	0
Central Connecticut		–		3	–	7	–	0
Southern Connecticut State		–		3	–	7	–	0
Central State (OH)		–		2	–	9	–	0
West Chester		–		2	–	9	–	0
^ – NCAA Division II playoff participant; Rankings from Associated Press poll

== Conference summaries ==
Conference	Champion
Association of Mid-Continent Universities	Youngstown State
California Collegiate Athletic Association	Cal Poly
Central Intercollegiate Athletic Association	Winston-Salem State
Far Western Football Conference	UC Davis
Great Lakes Intercollegiate Athletic Conference	Grand Valley State
Gulf South Conference	Jacksonville State
Heartland Collegiate Conference	Indiana Central
Missouri Intercollegiate Athletic Association	Southwest Missouri State
North Central Conference	South Dakota
Southern Intercollegiate Athletic Conference	Florida A&M†

† While the Southern Intercollegiate Athletic Conference (SIAC) was a Division II conference, Florida A&M (FAMU) had successfully petitioned the NCAA for Division I classification (Division I-AA in football), which took effect on September 1, 1978. FAMU subsequently competed in the 1978 Division I-AA postseason, winning the Division I-AA championship.

== Postseason ==
1978 NCAA Division II Football Championship
- Teams: 8
- Finals Site: Lobo Stadium; Longview, TX
- Champion: Eastern Illinois; (1st title, 1st title game)
- Runner-up: Delaware; (2nd title game)
- Semifinalists: Winston-Salem State; Youngstown State
- Winning coach: Darrell Mudra; 1st championship

The 1978 NCAA Division II Football Championship playoffs were the sixth single-elimination tournament to determine the national champion of men's NCAA Division II college football. The championship game was held at Lobo Stadium in Longview, Texas for the first time.

=== Playoff bracket ===
First round Campus sites
Winston–Salem State	17
Cal Poly	10
Delaware	42
Jacksonville State	21
Youngstown State	21
Nebraska–Omaha	14
Eastern Illinois	35
UC Davis	31

Semifinals; Campus sites
Winston–Salem State	0
Delaware	41
Youngstown State	22
Eastern Illinois	26

Championship; Lobo Stadium; Longview, TX
Delaware	9
Eastern Illinois	10

== See also ==
- 1978 NCAA Division I-A football season
- 1978 NCAA Division I-AA football season
- 1978 NCAA Division III football season
- 1978 NAIA Division I football season
- 1978 NAIA Division II football season
