= 1978 Nevada Wolf Pack football team =

American college football season

1978 Nevada Wolf Pack football

NCAA Division I-AA Semifinal, L 21–44 vs. UMass
- Conference: Independent

Ranking
- AP: No. 1
- Record: 11–1
- Head coach: Chris Ault (3rd season)
- Defensive coordinator: John L. Smith (2nd season)
- Home stadium: Mackay Stadium

1978 NCAA Division I-AA independents football standings
	Conf.			Overall
Team	W	L	T	W		L		T
No. 1 Nevada ^		–		11	–	1	–	0
No. 9 Lehigh		–		8	–	3	–	0
Northeastern		–		6	–	5	–	0
Bucknell		–		5	–	5	–	0
Northwestern State		–		5	–	6	–	0
Portland State		–		5	–	6	–	0
Lafayette		–		4	–	7	–	0
^ – NCAA Division I-AA playoff participant; Rankings from Associated Press poll

The 1978 Nevada Wolf Pack football team represented the University of Nevada, Reno as an independent during the 1978 NCAA Division I-AA football season. Led by third-year head coach Chris Ault, the Wolf Pack compiled a record of 11–1. Nevada advanced to the NCAA Division I-AA Football Championship playoffs, where the Wolf Pack lost in the semifinals to UMass. The team played home games at Mackay Stadium in Reno, Nevada.

== Schedule ==
Date	Opponent	Rank	Site	Result	Attendance	Source
September 9	Stephen F. Austin		Mackay Stadium; Reno, NV	W 32–0	9,672	
September 16	at UNLV		Las Vegas Silver Bowl; East Las Vegas, NV (Fremont Cannon)	W 23–14	20,910	
September 23	UC Davis	No. 5	Mackay Stadium; Reno, NV	W 12–7	12,093	
September 30	San Francisco State	No. 4	Mackay Stadium; Reno, NV	W 37–14	7,992	
October 7	Western Washington	No. 3	Mackay Stadium; Reno, NV	W 66–0	6,982	
October 14	at Cal State Fullerton	No. 3	Falcon Stadium; Norwalk, CA	W 37–14		
October 21	Santa Clara^{†}	No. 3	Mackay Stadium; Reno, NV	W 38–6	12,369	
October 28	at Sacramento State	No. 2	Hornet Stadium; Sacramento, CA	W 39–15	3,100	
November 4	Cal State Hayward	No. 1	Mackay Stadium; Reno, NV	W 21–0	9,412	
November 11	South Dakota	No. 1	Mackay Stadium; Reno, NV	W 50–7	9,412	
November 18	at Idaho State	No. 1	ASISU Minidome; Pocatello, ID	W 37–0		
December 9	No. T–4 UMass	No. 1	Mackay Stadium; Reno, NV (NCAA Division I-AA Semifinal)	L 21–44	14,026	
^{†}Homecoming; Rankings from Associated Press Poll released prior to the game
