= 1978 Northern Arizona Lumberjacks football team =

American college football season

1978 Northern Arizona Lumberjacks football

Big Sky champion
- Conference: Big Sky Conference

Ranking
- AP: No. 7
- Record: 8–2 (6–0 Big Sky)
- Head coach: Joe Salem (4th season)
- Home stadium: NAU Skydome

1978 Big Sky Conference football standings
	Conf.					Overall
Team	W		L		T	W		L		T
No. 7 Northern Arizona $	6	–	0	–	0	8	–	2	–	0
No. T–9 Montana State	4	–	2	–	0	8	–	2	–	0
Montana	4	–	2	–	0	5	–	6	–	0
Boise State	3	–	3	–	0	7	–	4	–	0
Weber State	2	–	4	–	0	4	–	7	–	0
Idaho	2	–	4	–	0	2	–	9	–	0
Idaho State	0	–	6	–	0	2	–	9	–	0
$ – Conference champion; Rankings from NCAA Division I-AA AP Poll

The 1978 Northern Arizona Lumberjacks football team was an American football team that represented Northern Arizona University (NAU) as a member of the Big Sky Conference (Big Sky) during the 1978 NCAA Division I-AA football season. In their fourth and final year under head coach Joe Salem, the Lumberjacks compiled an 8–2 record (6–0 against conference opponents), outscored opponents by a total of 259 to 174, and won the Big Sky championship. The team played its home games at the NAU Skydome, in Flagstaff, Arizona.

The team's statistical leaders included Allan Clark with 1,366 rushing yards (including 261 yards against Montana State, 250 yards against Boise State, and 245 yards against Idaho State), at the time a Northern Arizona school record. Bill Holst led the team in passing with 835 passing yards. Jerry Lumpkin led with 121 tackles.

== Schedule ==
Date	Opponent	Site	Result	Attendance	Source
September 2	at North Dakota State*	Dacotah Field; Fargo, ND	L 7–23	8,100	
September 9	Portland State*	NAU Skydome; Flagstaff, AZ	W 42–14		
September 16	Idaho State	NAU Skydome; Flagstaff, AZ	W 34–14		
September 23	at Montana	Dornblaser Field; Missoula, MT	W 21–6	6,000	
September 30	at Idaho	Kibbie Dome; Moscow, ID	W 34–29		
October 7	Cal Poly Pomona*^{†}	NAU Skydome; Flagstaff, AZ	W 31–3	16,153	
October 21	at Northern Colorado*	Jackson Field; Greeley, CO	L 6–33		
October 28	at Montana State	Sales Stadium; Bozeman, MT	W 43–22		
November 11	Boise State	NAU Skydome; Flagstaff, AZ	W 31–30	14,783	
November 18	Weber State	NAU Skydome; Flagstaff, AZ	W 10–0	11,491	
*Non-conference game; ^{†}Homecoming
