= Steve Parker (defensive end, born 1959) =

American football player

No. 60, 78
- Position: Defensive end

Personal information
- Born: September 21, 1959 (age 67); Evanston, Illinois, U.S.
- Listed height: 6 ft 4 in (1.93 m)
- Listed weight: 256 lb (116 kg)

Career information
- High school: Evanston Township
- College: Triton (1977); Eastern Illinois (1978–1980)
- NFL draft: 1981: undrafted

Career history
- Hamilton Tiger-Cats (1981–1982); Baltimore/Indianapolis Colts (1983–1984)

Awards and highlights
- NCAA Division II national champion (1978)

Career NFL statistics
- Sacks: 2.5
- Fumble recoveries: 3
- Stats at Pro Football Reference

Steven Royce Parker (born September 21, 1959) is an American former professional football player who was a defensive end for two seasons with the Baltimore/Indianapolis Colts of the National Football League (NFL). He played college football at Triton College and Eastern Illinois University. Parker also played for the Hamilton Tiger-Cats of the Canadian Football League (CFL).

== Early life and college ==
Steven Royce Parker was born on September 21, 1959, in Evanston, Illinois. He attended Evanston Township High School in Evanston.

Parker first played college football at Triton College in 1977. He then transferred to play for the Eastern Illinois Panthers of Eastern Illinois University from 1978 to 1980. The 1978 Panthers were NCAA Division II national champions.

== Professional career ==
After going undrafted in the 1981 NFL draft, Parker signed with the Hamilton Tiger-Cats of the Canadian Football League (CFL) on September 27, 1981. He played in four games for the Tiger-Cats during the 1981 CFL season and recorded 0.5 sacks. He played in two games in 1982, posting one sack, before being released on July 18, 1982.

Parker signed with the Baltimore Colts on May 25, 1983. He appeared in all 16 games, starting 15, for the Colts during the 1983 season, totaling 1.5 sacks and three fumble recoveries. He played in nine games, starting one, for the newly-renamed Indianapolis Colts in 1984 and made one sack before being placed on injured reserve on November 28, 1994. Parker was released on August 12, 1985.
