= Steve Turk =

American football player (born 1957)

Profile
- Position: Quarterback

Personal information
- Born: November 28, 1957 (age 68); USA
- Listed height: 6 ft 4 in (1.93 m)
- Listed weight: 210 lb (95 kg)

Career information
- High school: Morris
- College: Eastern Illinois
- NFL draft: 1980: undrafted

Career history
- Green Bay Packers (1980)*; Denver Gold (1983)
- * Offseason or practice squad member only

Steve Turk (born November 28, 1957) is an American former football quarterback who played one season with the Denver Gold of the United States Football League (USFL). He played college football at Eastern Illinois.
