= 1978 NCAA Division II football rankings =

The 1978 NCAA Division II football rankings are from the Associated Press. This is for the 1978 season.

== Legend ==
	Increase in ranking
	Decrease in ranking
	Not ranked previous week
(#–#)	Win–loss record
(Italics)	Number of first place votes
т	Tied with team above or below also with this symbol

== Associated Press poll ==
	Week 1 Sept 27	Week 2 Oct 4	Week 3 Oct 11	Week 4 Oct 18	Week 5 Oct 25	Week 6 Nov 1	Week 7 Nov 8	Week 8 Nov 15	
1.	Delaware (3–0)	Winston-Salem State (5–0)	Winston-Salem State (6–0)	Winston-Salem State (7–0)	Winston-Salem State (8–0)	Winston-Salem State (9–0)	Winston-Salem State (9–0)	Winston-Salem State (10–0)	1.
2.	Winston-Salem State (4–0)	Delaware (3–1)	Cal Poly (4–0)	Youngstown State (6–0)	Youngstown State (7–0)	Youngstown State (7–1)	Youngstown State (8–1)	Youngstown State (9–1)	2.
3.	North Dakota (3–1)	Cal Poly (3–0)	Youngstown State (5–0)	Delaware (4–2)	Delaware (5–2)	Nebraska–Omaha (8–1)	Cal Poly (6–1)	Delaware (7–3)	3.
4.	Eastern Illinois (4–0)	Youngstown State (4–0)	Akron (4–1)	Cal Poly (4–1)	Cal Poly (5–1)	Cal Poly (5–1)	Delaware (6–3)	UC Davis (7–2)	4.
5.	Northern Michigan (2–1)	Northern Michigan (3–1)	Delaware (3–2)	Nebraska–Omaha (6–1)	UC Davis (5–1)	Troy State (6–1)	Troy State (7–1)	Eastern Illinois (8–2)	5.
6.	Youngstown State (3–0)	Akron (3–1)	UC Davis (3–1)	Akron (4–2)	Nebraska–Omaha (7–1)	Delaware (5–3)	UC Davis (6–2)	Nebraska–Omaha (8–2–1)	6.
7.	Bethune–Cookman (3–0)	Troy State (3–0)	Nebraska–Omaha (5–1)	North Alabama (5–0–1)	Troy State (5–1)	UC Davis (5–2)	Eastern Illinois (7–2)	Jacksonville State (6–2)	7.
8.	North Dakota State (3–1)	Eastern Illinois (4–1)	Mississippi College (5–0)	Northern Michigan (4–1–1)	Eastern Illinois (5–2)	Akron (5–3)	South Dakota (7–3)	Cal Poly (6–2)	8.
9.	Cal Poly (2–0)	UC Davis (2–1)	Jacksonville State (3–1)	UC Davis (4–1)	Northern Michigan (4–2–1)	Eastern Illinois (6–2)	Jacksonville State (5–2)	American International (6–2–1)	9.
10.	Jacksonville State (2–1)	Jacksonville State (3–1) т	Northern Michigan (3–1–1)	Troy State (4–1)	Jacksonville State (3–2)	Jacksonville State (4–2)	Nebraska–Omaha (8–2)	Puget Sound (10–0)	10.
11.		Virginia Union (2–1) т							11.
	Week 1 Sept 27	Week 2 Oct 4	Week 3 Oct 11	Week 4 Oct 18	Week 5 Oct 25	Week 6 Nov 1	Week 7 Nov 8	Week 8 Nov 15	
		Dropped: 3 North Dakota; 7 Bethune–Cookman; 8 North Dakota State	Dropped: 7 Troy State; 8 Eastern Illinois; 10 Virginia Union	Dropped: 8 Mississippi College; 9 Jacksonville State	Dropped: 6 Akron; 7 North Alabama	Dropped: 9 Northern Michigan	Dropped: 8 Akron	Dropped: 5 Troy State; 8 South Dakota	
