= 1978 Navy Midshipmen football team =

American college football season

1978 Navy Midshipmen football

Holiday Bowl champion

Holiday Bowl, W 23–16 vs. BYU
- Conference: Independent

Ranking
- Coaches: No. 17
- Record: 9–3
- Head coach: George Welsh (6th season)
- Captains: Nick Mygas; Phil McConkey
- Home stadium: Navy–Marine Corps Memorial Stadium

1978 NCAA Division I-A independents football records
	Conf.					Overall
Team	W		L		T	W		L		T
No. 4 Penn State		–		–		11	–	1	–	0
North Texas State		–		–		9	–	2	–	0
East Carolina		–		–		9	–	3	–	0
Navy		–		–		9	–	3	–	0
No. 7 Notre Dame		–		–		9	–	3	–	0
Rutgers		–		–		9	–	3	–	0
Florida State		–		–		8	–	3	–	0
Tennessee State		–		–		8	–	3	–	0
Temple		–		–		7	–	3	–	1
Pittsburgh		–		–		8	–	4	–	0
Holy Cross		–		–		7	–	4	–	0
Louisville		–		–		7	–	4	–	0
UNLV		–		–		7	–	4	–	0
Southern Miss		–		–		7	–	4	–	0
Northeast Louisiana		–		–		6	–	4	–	1
Georgia Tech		–		–		7	–	5	–	0
Hawaii		–		–		6	–	5	–	0
Miami (FL)		–		–		6	–	5	–	0
South Carolina		–		–		5	–	5	–	1
William & Mary		–		–		5	–	5	–	1
Cincinnati		–		–		5	–	6	–	0
Villanova		–		–		5	–	6	–	0
Army		–		–		4	–	6	–	1
Memphis State		–		–		4	–	7	–	0
Tulane		–		–		4	–	7	–	0
Virginia Tech		–		–		4	–	7	–	0
Air Force		–		–		3	–	8	–	0
Colgate		–		–		3	–	8	–	0
Richmond		–		–		3	–	8	–	0
Syracuse		–		–		3	–	8	–	0
Illinois State		–		–		2	–	9	–	0
West Virginia		–		–		2	–	9	–	0
Boston College		–		–		0	–	11	–	0
Rankings from AP Poll

The 1978 Navy Midshipmen football team represented the United States Naval Academy (USNA) as an independent during the 1978 NCAA Division I-A football season. The team was led by sixth-year head coach George Welsh.

== Schedule ==
Date	Opponent	Rank	Site	Result	Attendance	Source
September 16	at Virginia		Scott Stadium; Charlottesville, VA	W 32–0	28,472	
September 23	at Connecticut		Memorial Stadium; Storrs, CT	W 30–0	6,804	
September 30	at Boston College		Alumni Stadium; Chestnut Hill, MA	W 19–8	24,082	
October 7	at Air Force		Falcon Stadium; Colorado Springs, CO (Commander-in-Chief's Trophy)	W 37–8	30,482	
October 14	Duke		Navy–Marine Corps Memorial Stadium; Annapolis, MD	W 31–8	21,431	
October 21	William & Mary	No. 17	Navy–Marine Corps Memorial Stadium; Annapolis, MD	W 9–0	20,193	
October 28	No. 15 Pittsburgh^{†}	No. 18	Navy–Marine Corps Memorial Stadium; Annapolis, MD	W 21–11	32,909	
November 4	vs. No. 15 Notre Dame	No. 11	Municipal Stadium; Cleveland, OH (rivalry)	L 7–27	63,780	
November 11	at Syracuse	No. 18	Archbold Stadium; Syracuse, NY	L 17–20	26,429	
November 18	at Florida State		Doak Campbell Stadium; Tallahassee, FL	L 6–38	45,795	
December 2	vs. Army		John F. Kennedy Stadium; Philadelphia, PA (Army–Navy Game)	W 28–0	79,026	
December 22	vs. BYU		San Diego Stadium; San Diego, CA (Holiday Bowl)	W 23–16	52,500	
^{†}Homecoming; Rankings from AP Poll released prior to the game

== Game summaries ==
=== At Air Force ===
	1	2	3	4	Total
Navy (3–0)	10	13	7	7	37
Air Force (2–2)	0	0	0	8	8

- Attendance: 30,482
- Navy scored on six of its first seven possessions, gained over 400 yards of total offense and held Air Force to 75 yards through three quarters
- Navy's best start since 1960
- NAVY: Tata 47 FG
- NAVY: McConkey 19 run (Tata kick)
- NAVY: Tata 39 FG
- NAVY: McConkey 36 pass from Leszczynski (Tata kick)
- NAVY: Tata 43 FG
- NAVY: Gainer 17 run (Tata kick)
- AFA: Fortson 11 run (pass good)
- NAVY: Callahan 39 run (Tata kick)

=== At Florida State ===
Navy Midshipmen (7–2) at Florida State Seminoles (6–3)

Quarter	1	2	3	4	Total
Navy	3	3	0	0	6
Florida St	0	7	17	14	38

at Doak Campbell Stadium, Tallahassee, Florida

- Date: November 18, 1978
- Game time: 12:50 p.m. EDT
- Game weather: Partly cloudy, 76 °F (24 °C)
- Game attendance: 45,795
- Referee: W.T. Miller
- TV: ABC
- Box Score
- Navy accepted bid to Holiday Bowl

External videos
- Game broadcast (part 1)
- Game broadcast (part 2)
- Game broadcast (part 3)
- Game broadcast (part 4)

Team	Category	Player	Statistics
Navy	Passing	Bob Leszczynski	10/20, 188 Yds, INT
Navy	Rushing	Kevin Tolbert	5 Rush, 27 Yds
Navy	Receiving	Sandy Jones	2 Rec, 51 Yds
Florida St	Passing	Jimmy Jordan	15/27, 280 Yds, 4 TD
Florida St	Rushing	Greg Ramsey	5 Rush, 51 Yds, TD
Florida St	Receiving	Sam Platt	6 Rec, 145 Yds, 3 TD

Scoring summary

Quarter	Time	Drive			Team	Scoring information	Score	
Quarter	Time	Plays	Yards	TOP	Team	Scoring information	NAVY	FSU
1	0:48	4	35		Navy	43-yard field goal by Bob Tata	3	0
2	4:10	3	60		Florida St	Greg Ramsey 12-yard touchdown run, Dave Cappelen kick good	3	7
2	2:28	6	77		Navy	46-yard field goal by Bob Tata	6	7
3	11:58	4	28		Florida St	38-yard field goal by Dave Cappelen	6	10
3	9:38	3	11		Florida St	Sam Platt 4-yard touchdown reception from Jimmy Jordan, Dave Cappelen kick good	6	17
3	6:55	4	56		Florida St	Sam Platt 36-yard touchdown reception from Jimmy Jordan, Dave Cappelen kick good	6	24
4	13:50	5	90		Florida St	Sam Platt 51-yard touchdown reception from Jimmy Jordan, Dave Cappelen kick good	6	31
4	9:00	7	53		Florida St	Grady King 23-yard touchdown reception from Jimmy Jordan, Dave Cappelen kick good	6	38
"TOP" = time of possession. For other American football terms, see Glossary of American football.							6	38

=== vs Army ===
Army Cadets vs. Navy Midshipmen

Quarter	1	2	3	4	Total
Army	0	0	0	0	0
Navy	14	7	7	0	28

at JFK Stadium • Philadelphia, Pennsylvania

- Date: December 2
- Game attendance: 79,026

Scoring summary

Quarter	Time	Drive			Team	Scoring information	Score	
Quarter	Time	Plays	Yards	TOP	Team	Scoring information	ARMY	NAVY
1					Navy	Bob Leszczynski 3-yard touchdown run, Bob Tata kick good	0	7
1					Navy	Steve Callahan 1-yard touchdown run, Bob Tata kick good	0	14
2					Navy	Bob Leszczynski 1-yard touchdown run, Bob Tata kick good	0	21
3					Navy	Steve Callahan 18-yard touchdown reception from Bob Leszczynski, Bob Tata kick good	0	28
"TOP" = time of possession. For other American football terms, see Glossary of American football.							0	28

== Roster ==
1978 Navy Midshipmen football team roster
Players
Coaches
Offense

Pos.	#	Name	Class
OL		Rick Bott
RB		Steve Callahan
WR		Mike Chapon
RB		Dwayne Dennis
OL		Tom Feldman
RB		Duane Flowers
TE		Curt Gainer
TE		Carl Hendershot
WR		Sandy Jones
FB	33	Larry Klawinski	Jr
RB		Chris Klein
OL		Steve Kremer
QB	15	Bob Leszczynski	Sr
OL		Frank McCallister
WR		Phil McConkey (C)
TE		Matt McLaughlin
QB		Kevin McTavish
RB		Eddie Meyers
TE		Greg Papajohn
QB		Bob Powers
RB	23	Mike Sherlock	So
OL		John Taylor
RB		Kevin Tolbert
RB		Dave Walker

Defense

Pos.	#	Name	Class
DL		Steve Chambers
DL		John Merrill
LB		Gregg Milo
LB		Nick Mygas (C)
LB		Tom Paulk
DB		Fred Reitzel
DL		Mark Stephens
DL		Charlie Thornton
DB		Bob Wilson
DB		Chuck Zingler

Special teams

Pos.	#	Name	Class
P		Lex Lauletta
P		Art Ohanian
K		Bob Tata

Head coach

- George Welsh

Coordinators/assistant coaches

Legend

- (C) Team captain
- (S) Suspended
- (I) Ineligible
- Injured
- Redshirt
