= 1978 Florida State Seminoles football team =

American college football season

1978 Florida State Seminoles football
- Conference: Independent
- Record: 8–3
- Head coach: Bobby Bowden (3rd season)
- Offensive coordinator: George Haffner (3rd season)
- Offensive scheme: Multiple
- Defensive coordinator: Jack Stanton (3rd season)
- Base defense: 4–3
- Captains: Nate Henderson; Willie Jones; Ivory Joe Hunter
- Home stadium: Doak Campbell Stadium

1978 NCAA Division I-A independents football records
	Conf.					Overall
Team	W		L		T	W		L		T
No. 4 Penn State		–		–		11	–	1	–	0
North Texas State		–		–		9	–	2	–	0
East Carolina		–		–		9	–	3	–	0
Navy		–		–		9	–	3	–	0
No. 7 Notre Dame		–		–		9	–	3	–	0
Rutgers		–		–		9	–	3	–	0
Florida State		–		–		8	–	3	–	0
Tennessee State		–		–		8	–	3	–	0
Temple		–		–		7	–	3	–	1
Pittsburgh		–		–		8	–	4	–	0
Holy Cross		–		–		7	–	4	–	0
Louisville		–		–		7	–	4	–	0
UNLV		–		–		7	–	4	–	0
Southern Miss		–		–		7	–	4	–	0
Northeast Louisiana		–		–		6	–	4	–	1
Georgia Tech		–		–		7	–	5	–	0
Hawaii		–		–		6	–	5	–	0
Miami (FL)		–		–		6	–	5	–	0
South Carolina		–		–		5	–	5	–	1
William & Mary		–		–		5	–	5	–	1
Cincinnati		–		–		5	–	6	–	0
Villanova		–		–		5	–	6	–	0
Army		–		–		4	–	6	–	1
Memphis State		–		–		4	–	7	–	0
Tulane		–		–		4	–	7	–	0
Virginia Tech		–		–		4	–	7	–	0
Air Force		–		–		3	–	8	–	0
Colgate		–		–		3	–	8	–	0
Richmond		–		–		3	–	8	–	0
Syracuse		–		–		3	–	8	–	0
Illinois State		–		–		2	–	9	–	0
West Virginia		–		–		2	–	9	–	0
Boston College		–		–		0	–	11	–	0
Rankings from AP Poll

The 1978 Florida State Seminoles football team represented Florida State University as an independent during the 1978 NCAA Division I-A football season. Led by third-year head coach Bobby Bowden, the Seminoles compiled a record of 8–3. Florida State played home games at Doak Campbell Stadium in Tallahassee, Florida.

== Schedule ==
Date	Opponent	Rank	Site	TV	Result	Attendance	Source
September 9	at Syracuse	No. 17	Archbold Stadium; Syracuse, NY		W 28–0	24,272	
September 16	Oklahoma State	No. 16	Doak Campbell Stadium; Tallahassee, FL		W 38–20	40,338	
September 23	at Miami (FL)	No. 13	Miami Orange Bowl; Miami, FL (rivalry)	ABC	W 31–21	25,002	
September 30	Houston	No. 10	Doak Campbell Stadium; Tallahassee, FL		L 21–27	41,142	
October 7	Cincinnati	No. 18	Doak Campbell Stadium; Tallahassee, FL		W 26–21	39,599	
October 14	at Mississippi State	No. 15	Scott Field; Starkville, MS		L 27–55	36,000	
October 21	at No. 16 Pittsburgh		Pitt Stadium; Pittsburgh, PA		L 3–7	55,104	
October 28	at Southern Miss		M. M. Roberts Stadium; Hattiesburg, MS		W 38–16	23,248	
November 11	Virginia Tech		Doak Campbell Stadium; Tallahassee, FL		W 24–14	38,654	
November 18	Navy^{†}		Doak Campbell Stadium; Tallahassee, FL	ABC	W 38–6	45,795	
November 25	Florida		Doak Campbell Stadium; Tallahassee, FL (rivalry)		W 38–21	48,432	
^{†}Homecoming; Rankings from AP Poll released prior to the game

== Personnel ==
1978 Florida State Seminoles football team roster
Players
Coaches
Offense

Pos.	#	Name	Class
OL		Lee Adams
OL		Brent Brock
RB		Gator Cherry
TE		Sam Childers
WR		Jackie Flowers
OL		Greg Futch
OL		Mike Good
OL		Nate Henderson
RB		Homes Johnson
QB		Jimmy Jordan
TE		Bill Keck
RB		Keith Kennedy
TE		Grady King
OL		Ken Lanier
RB		Mark Lyles
RB		Sam Platt
RB		Greg Ramsey
WR		Milton Raysor
RB		Ernie Sims
WR		Lawrence Strainge
WR		Kurt Unglaub
RB		Wade Wallace
OL		Gil Wesley
RB		Michael Whiting
WR		Phil Williams
QB		Wally Woodham

Defense

Pos.	#	Name	Class
DB		Monk Bonasorte
DB		Bobby Butler
DL		Walter Carter
DL		Jarvis Coursey
LB		David Hanks
DB		Ozzie Harrell
DB		Gary Henry
LB		Reggie Herring
DB		Keith Jones
DL		Willie Jones
DB		Mike Kincaid
DL		Mark Macek
DL		Jeremy Mindin
LB		Paul Piurowski
DL		Ed Richardson
DL		Arthur Scott
DL		Ron Simmons
DB		Mike Smith
DL		Scott Warren

Special teams

Pos.	#	Name	Class
K		Bill Capece
K		Dave Cappelen
P		Rohn Stark

Head coach

- Bobby Bowden

Coordinators/assistant coaches

- Kent Schoolfield (Wide receivers)
- Dick Hopkins (Graduate assistant)

Legend

- (C) Team captain
- (S) Suspended
- (I) Ineligible
- Injured
- Redshirt

== Game summaries ==
=== At Miami (FL) ===
#13 Florida State Seminoles (2–0) at Miami (FL) Hurricanes (0–1)

Quarter	1	2	3	4	Total
Florida St	0	14	7	10	31
Miami (FL)	7	7	0	7	21

at Orange Bowl, Miami, Florida

- Date: September 23, 1978
- Game weather: Cloudy, 83 °F (28 °C)
- Game attendance: 25,003
- Box Score

Team	Category	Player	Statistics
Florida St	Passing	Jimmy Jordan	8/12, 83 Yds, TD, INT
Florida St	Rushing	Homes Johnson	23 Rush, 90 Yds
Florida St	Receiving	Mark Lyles	5 Rec, 58 Yds, TD
Miami (FL)	Passing	Mark Richt	5/11, 74 Yds, TD, 3 INT
Miami (FL)	Rushing	Ottis Anderson	15 Rush, 137 Yds, TD
Miami (FL)	Receiving	Mark Cooper	3 Rec, 48 Yds

Scoring summary

Quarter	Time	Drive			Team	Scoring information	Score	
Quarter	Time	Plays	Yards	TOP	Team	Scoring information	FSU	UM
1	9:27	1	80	0:15	Miami (FL)	Ottis Anderson 80-yard touchdown run, Danny Miller kick good	0	7
2	12:57				Florida St	Blocked punt returned 48 yards for touchdown by Mark Macek, Dave Cappelen kick good	7	7
2	9:25	2	52	0:19	Miami (FL)	James Joiner 48-yard touchdown run, Danny Miller kick good	7	14
2	2:49	13	76	6:36	Florida St	Jackie Flowers 4-yard touchdown reception from Jimmy Jordan, Dave Cappelen kick good	14	14
3	8:15	7	41	3:44	Florida St	Wally Woodham 1-yard touchdown run, Dave Cappelen kick good	21	14
4	6:58	4	-3	0:52	Florida St	26-yard field goal by Dave Cappelen	24	14
4	4:27	5	65	2:31	Miami (FL)	E.J. Baker 27-yard touchdown reception from Mark Richt, Danny Miller kick good	24	21
4	1:14	4	31	0:42	Florida St	Mark Lyles 22-yard touchdown reception from Wally Woodham, Dave Cappelen kick good	31	21
"TOP" = time of possession. For other American football terms, see Glossary of American football.							31	21

=== Navy ===
Navy Midshipmen (7–2) at Florida State Seminoles (6–3)

Quarter	1	2	3	4	Total
Navy	3	3	0	0	6
Florida St	0	7	17	14	38

at Doak Campbell Stadium, Tallahassee, Florida

- Date: November 18, 1978
- Game time: 12:50 p.m. EDT
- Game weather: Partly cloudy, 76 °F (24 °C)
- Game attendance: 45,795
- Referee: W.T. Miller
- TV: ABC
- Box Score
- ABC Players of the Game: Jimmy Jordan & Sam Platt (off), Ron Simmons (def) 10 tackles, FR, FF

External videos
- Game broadcast (part 1)
- Game broadcast (part 2)
- Game broadcast (part 3)
- Game broadcast (part 4)

Team	Category	Player	Statistics
Navy	Passing	Bob Leszczynski	10/20, 188 Yds, INT
Navy	Rushing	Kevin Tolbert	5 Rush, 27 Yds
Navy	Receiving	Sandy Jones	2 Rec, 51 Yds
Florida St	Passing	Jimmy Jordan	15/27, 280 Yds, 4 TD
Florida St	Rushing	Greg Ramsey	5 Rush, 51 Yds, TD
Florida St	Receiving	Sam Platt	6 Rec, 145 Yds, 3 TD

Scoring summary

Quarter	Time	Drive			Team	Scoring information	Score	
Quarter	Time	Plays	Yards	TOP	Team	Scoring information	NAVY	FSU
1	0:48	4	35		Navy	43-yard field goal by Bob Tata	3	0
2	4:10	3	60		Florida St	Greg Ramsey 12-yard touchdown run, Dave Cappelen kick good	3	7
2	2:28	6	77		Navy	46-yard field goal by Bob Tata	6	7
3	11:58	4	28		Florida St	38-yard field goal by Dave Cappelen	6	10
3	9:38	3	11		Florida St	Sam Platt 4-yard touchdown reception from Jimmy Jordan, Dave Cappelen kick good	6	17
3	6:55	4	56		Florida St	Sam Platt 36-yard touchdown reception from Jimmy Jordan, Dave Cappelen kick good	6	24
4	13:50	5	90		Florida St	Sam Platt 51-yard touchdown reception from Jimmy Jordan, Dave Cappelen kick good	6	31
4	9:00	7	53		Florida St	Grady King 23-yard touchdown reception from Jimmy Jordan, Dave Cappelen kick good	6	38
"TOP" = time of possession. For other American football terms, see Glossary of American football.							6	38
