= 1978 Georgia Tech Yellow Jackets football team =

American college football season

1978 Georgia Tech Yellow Jackets football
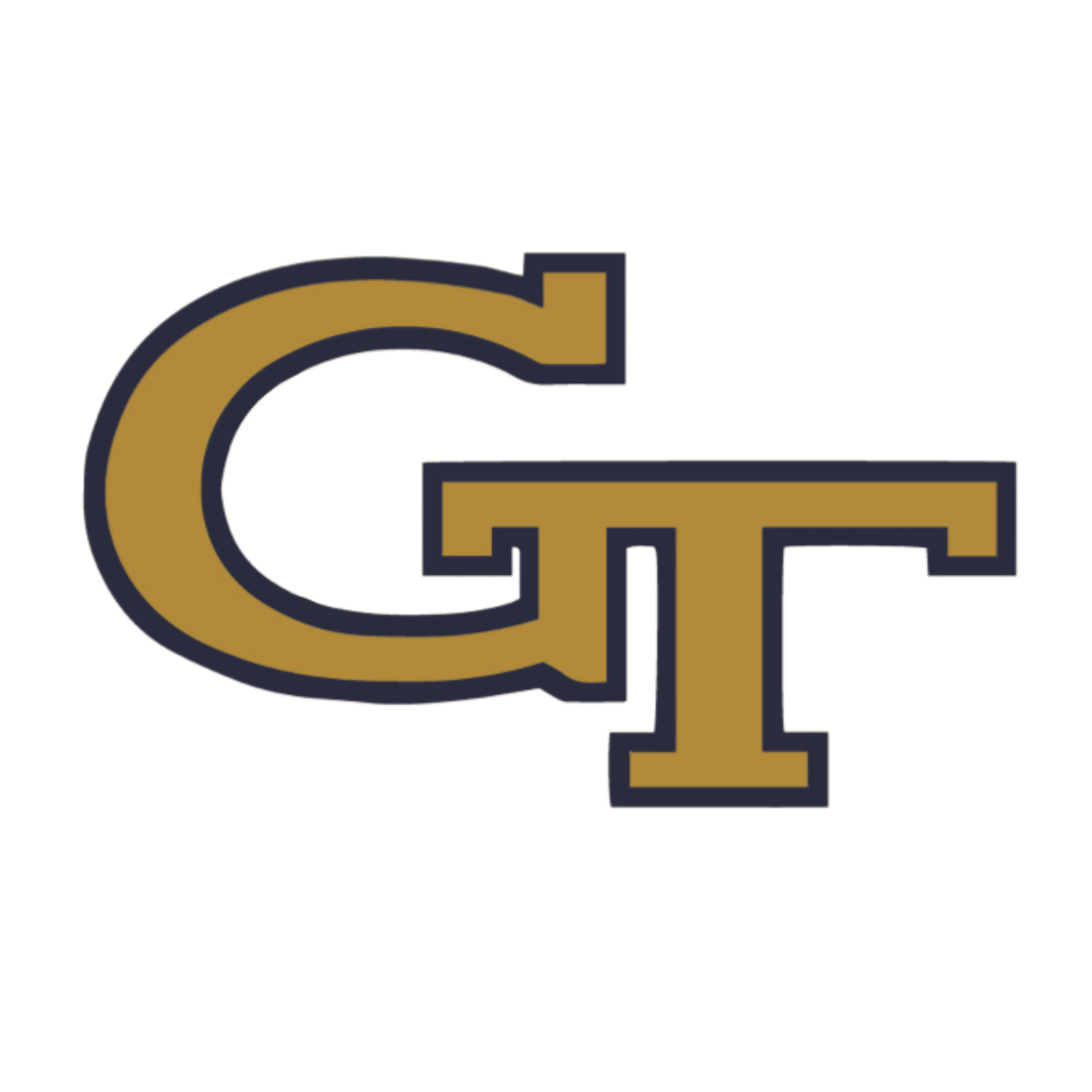

Peach Bowl, L 21–41 vs. Purdue
- Conference: Independent
- Record: 7–5
- Head coach: Pepper Rodgers (5th season)
- Captains: Eddie Lee Ivery; Don Patterson; Jeff Shank; Mike Taylor
- Home stadium: Grant Field

1978 NCAA Division I-A independents football records
	Conf.					Overall
Team	W		L		T	W		L		T
No. 4 Penn State		–		–		11	–	1	–	0
North Texas State		–		–		9	–	2	–	0
East Carolina		–		–		9	–	3	–	0
Navy		–		–		9	–	3	–	0
No. 7 Notre Dame		–		–		9	–	3	–	0
Rutgers		–		–		9	–	3	–	0
Florida State		–		–		8	–	3	–	0
Tennessee State		–		–		8	–	3	–	0
Temple		–		–		7	–	3	–	1
Pittsburgh		–		–		8	–	4	–	0
Holy Cross		–		–		7	–	4	–	0
Louisville		–		–		7	–	4	–	0
UNLV		–		–		7	–	4	–	0
Southern Miss		–		–		7	–	4	–	0
Northeast Louisiana		–		–		6	–	4	–	1
Georgia Tech		–		–		7	–	5	–	0
Hawaii		–		–		6	–	5	–	0
Miami (FL)		–		–		6	–	5	–	0
South Carolina		–		–		5	–	5	–	1
William & Mary		–		–		5	–	5	–	1
Cincinnati		–		–		5	–	6	–	0
Villanova		–		–		5	–	6	–	0
Army		–		–		4	–	6	–	1
Memphis State		–		–		4	–	7	–	0
Tulane		–		–		4	–	7	–	0
Virginia Tech		–		–		4	–	7	–	0
Air Force		–		–		3	–	8	–	0
Colgate		–		–		3	–	8	–	0
Richmond		–		–		3	–	8	–	0
Syracuse		–		–		3	–	8	–	0
Illinois State		–		–		2	–	9	–	0
West Virginia		–		–		2	–	9	–	0
Boston College		–		–		0	–	11	–	0
Rankings from AP Poll

The 1978 Georgia Tech Yellow Jackets football team represented the Georgia Institute of Technology during the 1978 NCAA Division I-A football season. The Yellow Jackets were led by fifth-year head coach Pepper Rodgers, and played their home games at Grant Field in Atlanta. The team was invited to the 1978 Peach Bowl, held just three miles from their home stadium in Atlanta, where they lost to Purdue.

On November 11, 1978 at Air Force Tech running back Eddie Lee Ivery rushed for 356 yards. At the time it set a new record for rushing yards in a game by a player.

== Schedule ==
Date	Opponent	Rank	Site	TV	Result	Attendance	Source
September 9	at Duke		Wallace Wade Stadium; Durham, NC		L 10–28	27,865	
September 16	California		Grant Field; Atlanta, GA		L 22–34	26,577	
September 23	Tulane		Grant Field; Atlanta, GA		W 27–17	25,805	
September 30	The Citadel		Grant Field; Atlanta, GA		W 28–0	21,802	
October 7	South Carolina		Grant Field; Atlanta, GA		W 6–3	36,128	
October 14	Miami (FL)		Grant Field; Atlanta, GA		W 24–19	29,695	
October 21	at Auburn		Jordan-Hare Stadium; Auburn, AL (rivalry)	ABC	W 24–10	59,111	
October 28	Florida^{†}		Grant Field; Atlanta, GA	ABC	W 17–13	44,866	
November 11	at Air Force		Falcon Stadium; Colorado Springs, CO		W 42–21	19,564	
November 18	No. 10 Notre Dame	No. 20	Grant Field; Atlanta, GA (rivalry)		L 21–38	54,526	
December 2	at No. 11 Georgia		Sanford Stadium; Athens, GA (Clean, Old-Fashioned Hate)	ABC	L 28–29	59,700	
December 25	vs. No. 17 Purdue		Atlanta–Fulton County Stadium; Atlanta, GA (Peach Bowl)	CBS	L 21–41	20,277	
^{†}Homecoming; Rankings from AP Poll released prior to the game
