= 1978 Lafayette Leopards football team =

American college football season

1978 Lafayette Leopards football
- Conference: Independent
- Record: 4–7
- Head coach: Neil Putnam (8th season)
- Captains: Jim Medes; Brian Musician
- Home stadium: Fisher Field

1978 NCAA Division I-AA independents football standings
	Conf.			Overall
Team	W	L	T	W		L		T
No. 1 Nevada ^		–		11	–	1	–	0
No. 9 Lehigh		–		8	–	3	–	0
Northeastern		–		6	–	5	–	0
Bucknell		–		5	–	5	–	0
Northwestern State		–		5	–	6	–	0
Portland State		–		5	–	6	–	0
Lafayette		–		4	–	7	–	0
^ – NCAA Division I-AA playoff participant; Rankings from Associated Press poll

The 1978 Lafayette Leopards football team was an American football team that represented Lafayette College as an independent during the 1978 NCAA Division I-AA football season. In their eighth year under head coach Neil Putnam, the Leopards compiled a 4–7 record. Jim Medes and Brian Musician were the team captains.

This was the first year of competition for Division I-AA, later to be renamed the Football Championship Subdivision. Lafayette, along with its in-state rivals Bucknell and Lehigh, moved up to I-AA after having previously competed as independents in NCAA Division II. The Leopards' 1978 schedule included opponents from Division I-A, Division I-AA, Division II and Division III.

Lafayette played home games at Fisher Field on College Hill in Easton, Pennsylvania.

== Schedule ==
Date	Opponent	Site	Result	Attendance	Source
September 9	Gettysburg	Fisher Field; Easton, PA	W 31–0	5,000	
September 16	at Army	Michie Stadium; West Point, NY	L 14–24	25,890	
September 23	Merchant Marine	Fisher Field; Easton, PA	L 10–13		
September 30	at Columbia	Baker Field; New York, NY	L 0–21	4,500	
October 7	Fordham^	Fisher Field; Easton, PA	W 17–14	7,700	
October 14	at Bucknell	Memorial Stadium; Lewisburg, PA	W 14–7		
October 21	Penn	Fisher Field; Easton, PA	W 20–19	11,200	
October 28	at Maine	Alumni Field; Orono, ME	L 25–31	3,000	
November 4	at Colgate	Andy Kerr Stadium; Hamilton, NY	L 7–17	4,500	
November 11	at Davidson	Richardson Stadium; Davidson, NC	L 12–17	2,000	
November 18	Lehigh	Fisher Field; Easton, PA (The Rivalry)	L 15–23	17,000	
^ Parents Days

== Roster ==
1978 Lafayette Leopards football team roster
Players
Coaches
Offense

Pos.	#	Name	Class
TE	86	Jim Flanigan	So
QB	15	Scott Sautter	Sr

Defense

Pos.	#	Name	Class

Special teams

Pos.	#	Name	Class
P	8	Dave Page	So

Head coach

- Carmen Cozza

Coordinators/assistant coaches

Legend

- (C) Team captain
- (S) Suspended
- (I) Ineligible
- Injured
- Redshirt
