= 1978 Louisville Cardinals football team =

American college football season

1978 Louisville Cardinals football
- Conference: Independent
- Record: 7–4
- Head coach: Vince Gibson (4th season)
- Home stadium: Fairgrounds Stadium

1978 NCAA Division I-A independents football records
	Conf.					Overall
Team	W		L		T	W		L		T
No. 4 Penn State		–		–		11	–	1	–	0
North Texas State		–		–		9	–	2	–	0
East Carolina		–		–		9	–	3	–	0
Navy		–		–		9	–	3	–	0
No. 7 Notre Dame		–		–		9	–	3	–	0
Rutgers		–		–		9	–	3	–	0
Florida State		–		–		8	–	3	–	0
Tennessee State		–		–		8	–	3	–	0
Temple		–		–		7	–	3	–	1
Pittsburgh		–		–		8	–	4	–	0
Holy Cross		–		–		7	–	4	–	0
Louisville		–		–		7	–	4	–	0
UNLV		–		–		7	–	4	–	0
Southern Miss		–		–		7	–	4	–	0
Northeast Louisiana		–		–		6	–	4	–	1
Georgia Tech		–		–		7	–	5	–	0
Hawaii		–		–		6	–	5	–	0
Miami (FL)		–		–		6	–	5	–	0
South Carolina		–		–		5	–	5	–	1
William & Mary		–		–		5	–	5	–	1
Cincinnati		–		–		5	–	6	–	0
Villanova		–		–		5	–	6	–	0
Army		–		–		4	–	6	–	1
Memphis State		–		–		4	–	7	–	0
Tulane		–		–		4	–	7	–	0
Virginia Tech		–		–		4	–	7	–	0
Air Force		–		–		3	–	8	–	0
Colgate		–		–		3	–	8	–	0
Richmond		–		–		3	–	8	–	0
Syracuse		–		–		3	–	8	–	0
Illinois State		–		–		2	–	9	–	0
West Virginia		–		–		2	–	9	–	0
Boston College		–		–		0	–	11	–	0
Rankings from AP Poll

The 1978 Louisville Cardinals football team was an American football team that represented the University of Louisville as an independent during the 1978 NCAA Division I-A football season. In their fourth season under head coach Vince Gibson, the Cardinals compiled a 7–4 record and outscored opponents by a total of 319 to 202.

The team's statistical leaders included Stu Stram with 929 passing yards, Nathan Poole with 1,394 rushing yards and 96 points scored, and Kenny Robinson with 534 receiving yards.

== Schedule ==
Date	Opponent	Site	Result	Attendance	Source
September 9	South Dakota State	Fairgrounds Stadium; Louisville, KY	W 54–7	21,109	
September 16	No. 20 Maryland	Fairgrounds Stadium; Louisville, KY	L 17–24	36,142	
September 23	at Cincinnati	Nippert Stadium; Cincinnati, OH (The Keg of Nails)	W 28–14		
September 30	Indiana State	Fairgrounds Stadium; Louisville, KY	W 31–12	16,931	
October 7	at Tulsa	Skelly Field; Tulsa, OK	L 7–24	20,500	
October 14	Northwestern State	Fairgrounds Stadium; Louisville, KY	W 51–7	13,372	
October 21	Boston University	Fairgrounds Stadium; Louisville, KY	W 35–7	15,886	
October 28	William & Mary	Fairgrounds Stadium; Louisville, KY	W 33–21	17,879	
November 4	at Wichita State	Cessna Stadium; Wichita, KS	W 38–20	10,812	
November 11	Memphis State	Fairgrounds Stadium; Louisville, KY (rivalry)	L 22–29	17,012	
November 18	at Southern Miss	M. M. Roberts Stadium; Hattiesburg, MS	L 3–37	16,219	
Rankings from AP Poll released prior to the game
