= 1978 Delaware Fightin' Blue Hens football team =

American college football season

1978 Delaware Fightin' Blue Hens football

NCAA II Division Championship, L 9–10 vs. Eastern Illinois
- Conference: Independent
- Record: 10–4
- Head coach: Tubby Raymond (13th season)
- Offensive coordinator: Ted Kempski (11th season)
- Offensive scheme: Delaware Wing-T
- Base defense: 5–2
- Home stadium: Delaware Stadium

1978 NCAA Division II independents football records
	Conf.			Overall
Team	W	L	T	W		L		T
No. 9 American International		–		6	–	2	–	1
No. 3 Delaware ^		–		10	–	4	–	0
No. 10 Puget Sound || || || – || || || || || 9 || – || 2 || – || 0
Kentucky State		–		7	–	2	–	1
Alabama State		–		8	–	3	–	0
Santa Clara		–		5	–	6	–	0
Arkansas–Pine Bluff		–		4	–	6	–	0
Northern Colorado		–		4	–	6	–	0
Springfield		–		4	–	6	–	0
Central Connecticut		–		3	–	7	–	0
Southern Connecticut State		–		3	–	7	–	0
United States International		–		2	–	8	–	0
Central State (OH)		–		2	–	9	–	0
West Chester		–		2	–	9	–	0
^ – NCAA Division II playoff participant; Rankings from Associated Press poll

The 1978 Delaware Fightin' Blue Hens football team represented the University of Delaware as an independent during the 1978 NCAA Division II football season. They were led by 13th-year head coach Tubby Raymond and played their home games at Delaware Stadium in Newark, Delaware.

== Schedule ==
Date	Opponent	Rank	Site	Result	Attendance	Source
September 9	Rhode Island		Delaware Stadium; Newark, DE	W 37–0	18,584	
September 16	West Chester		Delaware Stadium; Newark, DE (rivalry)	W 56–0	19,241	
September 23	Western Illinois		Delaware Stadium; Newark, DE	W 35–7	17,119	
September 30	at Temple	No. 1	Veterans Stadium; Philadelphia, PA	L 7–38	26,745	
October 7	at No. 6 (I-AA) Lehigh	No. 2	Taylor Stadium; Bethlehem, PA (rivalry)	L 17–27	14,000	
October 14	North Carolina A&T	No. 4	Delaware Stadium; Newark, DE	W 26–0	19,304	
October 21	at Middle Tennessee	No. 2	Johnny "Red" Floyd Stadium; Murfreesboro, TN	W 53–3	3,500	
October 28	at The Citadel	No. 2	Johnson Hagood Stadium; Charleston, SC	L 14–21	13,155	
November 4	Maine	No. 6	Delaware Stadium; Newark, DE	W 48–0	19,627	
November 11	Villanova	No. 4	Delaware Stadium; Newark, DE (rivalry)	W 23–22	20,189	
November 18	Colgate	No. 3	Delaware Stadium; Newark, DE	W 38–29	19,003	
November 25	No. 7 Jacksonville State	No. 3	Delaware Stadium; Newark, DE (NCAA Division II Quarterfinal)	W 42–27	11,235	
December 2	No. 1 Winston-Salem State	No. 3	Delaware Stadium; Newark, DE (NCAA Division II Semifinal)	W 41–0	10,963	
December 9	vs. No. 5 Eastern Illinois	No. 3	Pirate Stadium; Longview, TX (NCAA Division II Championship)	L 9–10	5,500	
Rankings from AP Poll released prior to the game
