= 1978 Army Cadets football team =

American college football season

1978 Army Cadets football
- Conference: Independent
- Record: 4–6–1
- Head coach: Homer Smith (5th season)
- Captains: Clennie Brundidge; Chuck Schott
- Home stadium: Michie Stadium

1978 NCAA Division I-A independents football records
	Conf.					Overall
Team	W		L		T	W		L		T
No. 4 Penn State		–		–		11	–	1	–	0
North Texas State		–		–		9	–	2	–	0
East Carolina		–		–		9	–	3	–	0
Navy		–		–		9	–	3	–	0
No. 7 Notre Dame		–		–		9	–	3	–	0
Rutgers		–		–		9	–	3	–	0
Florida State		–		–		8	–	3	–	0
Tennessee State		–		–		8	–	3	–	0
Temple		–		–		7	–	3	–	1
Pittsburgh		–		–		8	–	4	–	0
Holy Cross		–		–		7	–	4	–	0
Louisville		–		–		7	–	4	–	0
UNLV		–		–		7	–	4	–	0
Southern Miss		–		–		7	–	4	–	0
Northeast Louisiana		–		–		6	–	4	–	1
Georgia Tech		–		–		7	–	5	–	0
Hawaii		–		–		6	–	5	–	0
Miami (FL)		–		–		6	–	5	–	0
South Carolina		–		–		5	–	5	–	1
William & Mary		–		–		5	–	5	–	1
Cincinnati		–		–		5	–	6	–	0
Villanova		–		–		5	–	6	–	0
Army		–		–		4	–	6	–	1
Memphis State		–		–		4	–	7	–	0
Tulane		–		–		4	–	7	–	0
Virginia Tech		–		–		4	–	7	–	0
Air Force		–		–		3	–	8	–	0
Colgate		–		–		3	–	8	–	0
Richmond		–		–		3	–	8	–	0
Syracuse		–		–		3	–	8	–	0
Illinois State		–		–		2	–	9	–	0
West Virginia		–		–		2	–	9	–	0
Boston College		–		–		0	–	11	–	0
Rankings from AP Poll

The 1978 Army Cadets football team represented the United States Military Academy as an independent during the 1978 NCAA Division I-A football season. In their fifth and final year under head coach Homer Smith, the Cadets compiled a 4–6–1 record and were outscored by their opponents by a combined total of 255 to 188. In the annual Army–Navy Game, the Cadets lost to the Midshipmen by a 28 to 0 score.

No Army players were selected as first-team players on the 1978 College Football All-America Team.

The team had 13 starters back from the 1977 season, though were without their quarterback Leamon Hall.

== Schedule ==
Date	Time	Opponent	Site	Result	Attendance	Source
September 16		Lafayette	Michie Stadium; West Point, NY	W 24–14	25,890	
September 23		Virginia	Michie Stadium; West Point, NY	L 17–21	26,473	
September 30		Washington State	Michie Stadium; West Point, NY	T 21–21	31,612	
October 7		at Tennessee	Neyland Stadium; Knoxville, TN	L 13–31	81,887	
October 14		Holy Cross	Michie Stadium; West Point, NY	L 0–31	40,815	
October 21		at Florida	Florida Field; Gainesville, FL	L 7–31	57,625	
October 28		Colgate	Michie Stadium; West Point, NY	W 28–3	30,673	
November 4		Air Force	Michie Stadium; West Point, NY (Commander-in-Chief's Trophy)	W 28–14	40,115	
November 11		Boston College	Michie Stadium; West Point, NY	W 29–26	28,049	
November 18	1:30 p.m.	at No. 18 Pittsburgh	Pitt Stadium; Pittsburgh, PA	L 17–35	45,297	
December 2		vs. Navy	John F. Kennedy Stadium; Philadelphia, PA (Army–Navy Game)	L 0–28	79,026	
Rankings from AP Poll released prior to the game; All times are in Eastern time

== Roster ==
- Clennie Brundidge, Sr.
