= 1978 Northeastern Huskies football team =

American college football season

1978 Northeastern Huskies football
- Conference: Independent
- Record: 6–5
- Head coach: Robert Lyons (7th season)
- Home stadium: Parsons Field

1978 NCAA Division I-AA independents football standings
	Conf.			Overall
Team	W	L	T	W		L		T
No. 1 Nevada ^		–		11	–	1	–	0
No. 9 Lehigh		–		8	–	3	–	0
Northeastern		–		6	–	5	–	0
Bucknell		–		5	–	5	–	0
Northwestern State		–		5	–	6	–	0
Portland State		–		5	–	6	–	0
Lafayette		–		4	–	7	–	0
^ – NCAA Division I-AA playoff participant; Rankings from Associated Press poll

The 1978 Northeastern Huskies football team was an American football team that represented Northeastern University as an independent during the 1978 NCAA Division I-AA football season. Led by seventh-year head coach Robert Lyons, the team compiled a 6–5 record.

== Schedule ==
Date	Opponent	Site	Result	Attendance	Source
September 9	at Connecticut	Memorial Stadium; Storrs, CT	L 19–21		
September 16	at Rhode Island	Brown Stadium; Providence, RI	L 13–27	1,750	
September 23	C. W. Post	Parsons Field; Brookline, MA	W 28–8	4,867	
September 30	at No. T–10 Boston University	Nickerson Field; Boston, MA	L 24–25		
October 7	at Springfield	Benedum Field; Springfield, MA	W 17–7		
October 14	Southern Connecticut	Parsons Field; Brookline, MA	W 35–14		
October 21	West Chester	Parsons Field; Brookline, MA	W 21–6		
October 28	New Hampshire	Parsons Field; Brookline, MA	L 21–29		
November 4	at Bucknell	Memorial Stadium; Lewisburg, PA	L 9–34		
November 11	Central Connecticut	Parsons Field; Brookline, MA	W 35–20	2,012	
November 18	Maine	Parsons Field; Brookline, MA	W 20–19		
Rankings from Associated Press Poll released prior to the game
