= 1978 Villanova Wildcats football team =

American college football season

1978 Villanova Wildcats football
- Conference: Independent
- Record: 5–6
- Head coach: Dick Bedesem (4th season)
- Captains: Leon Mareski; Patrick McEvoy; Stephen Plastek; Chester Zalesky
- Home stadium: Villanova Stadium

1978 NCAA Division I-A independents football records
	Conf.					Overall
Team	W		L		T	W		L		T
No. 4 Penn State		–		–		11	–	1	–	0
North Texas State		–		–		9	–	2	–	0
East Carolina		–		–		9	–	3	–	0
Navy		–		–		9	–	3	–	0
No. 7 Notre Dame		–		–		9	–	3	–	0
Rutgers		–		–		9	–	3	–	0
Florida State		–		–		8	–	3	–	0
Tennessee State		–		–		8	–	3	–	0
Temple		–		–		7	–	3	–	1
Pittsburgh		–		–		8	–	4	–	0
Holy Cross		–		–		7	–	4	–	0
Louisville		–		–		7	–	4	–	0
UNLV		–		–		7	–	4	–	0
Southern Miss		–		–		7	–	4	–	0
Northeast Louisiana		–		–		6	–	4	–	1
Georgia Tech		–		–		7	–	5	–	0
Hawaii		–		–		6	–	5	–	0
Miami (FL)		–		–		6	–	5	–	0
South Carolina		–		–		5	–	5	–	1
William & Mary		–		–		5	–	5	–	1
Cincinnati		–		–		5	–	6	–	0
Villanova		–		–		5	–	6	–	0
Army		–		–		4	–	6	–	1
Memphis State		–		–		4	–	7	–	0
Tulane		–		–		4	–	7	–	0
Virginia Tech		–		–		4	–	7	–	0
Air Force		–		–		3	–	8	–	0
Colgate		–		–		3	–	8	–	0
Richmond		–		–		3	–	8	–	0
Syracuse		–		–		3	–	8	–	0
Illinois State		–		–		2	–	9	–	0
West Virginia		–		–		2	–	9	–	0
Boston College		–		–		0	–	11	–	0
Rankings from AP Poll

The 1978 Villanova Wildcats football team represented the Villanova University during the 1978 NCAA Division I-A football season. The head coach was Dick Bedesem, coaching his fourth season with the Wildcats. The team played their home games at Villanova Stadium in Villanova, Pennsylvania.

== Schedule ==
Date	Opponent	Site	Result	Attendance	Source
September 9	Bowling Green	Villanova Stadium; Villanova, PA	W 35–28	6,244	
September 16	at UMass	Alumni Stadium; Amherst, MA	W 25–21	8,800	
September 23	William & Mary	Villanova Stadium; Villanova, PA	L 17–21	9,000	
September 30	at Clemson	Memorial Stadium; Clemson, SC	L 0–31	47,786	
October 7	Richmond	Villanova Stadium; Villanova, PA	W 17–14		
October 14	Colgate	Villanova Stadium; Villanova, PA	L 14–20	11,200	
October 21	at Rutgers	Rutgers Stadium; New Brunswick, NJ	L 9–24	18,500	
October 28	at Youngstown State	Rayen Stadium; Youngstown, OH	W 22–17		
November 4	Boston College	Villanova Stadium; Villanova, PA	W 28–16	13,300	
November 11	at Delaware	Delaware Stadium; Newark, DE (rivalry)	L 22–23	20,189	
November 25	at Temple	Veterans Stadium; Philadelphia, PA (Mayor's Cup)	L 17–27		
