= 1978 Maine Black Bears football team =

American college football season

1978 Maine Black Bears football
- Conference: Yankee Conference
- Record: 3–7–1 (0–4–1 Yankee)
- Head coach: Jack Bicknell (3rd season)
- Captains: Chris Keating; William LeRoy
- Home stadium: Alumni Field

1978 Yankee Conference football standings
	Conf.					Overall
Team	W		L		T	W		L		T
No. T–4 UMass $^	5	–	0	–	0	9	–	4	–	0
No. 7 Rhode Island	3	–	2	–	0	7	–	3	–	0
Connecticut	3	–	2	–	0	4	–	7	–	0
Boston University	2	–	3	–	0	6	–	4	–	0
New Hampshire	1	–	3	–	1	6	–	4	–	1
Maine	0	–	4	–	1	3	–	7	–	1
$ – Conference champion; ^ – NCAA Division I-AA playoff participant; Rankings from Associated Press poll

The 1978 Maine Black Bears football team was an American football team that represented the University of Maine as a member of the Yankee Conference during the 1978 NCAA Division I-AA football season. In its third season under head coach Jack Bicknell, the team compiled a 3–7–1 record (0–4–1 against conference opponents) and finished last in the Yankee Conference. Chris Keating and William LeRoy were the team captains.

== Schedule ==
Date	Opponent	Site	Result	Attendance	Source
September 9	Dayton*	Alumni Field; Orono, ME	L 14–31	5,600	
September 16	at Boston University*	Nickerson Field; Boston, MA	L 14–27		
September 23	UMass	Alumni Field; Orono, ME	L 6–40	7,200	
September 30	at Central Connecticut*	Arute Field; New Britain, CT	W 32–26		
October 7	No. T–10 Rhode Island	Alumni Field; Orono, ME	L 0–47	7,600	
October 14	at New Hampshire	Cowell Stadium; Durham, NH	T 7–7		
October 21	at Connecticut	Memorial Stadium; Storrs, CT	L 7–49		
October 28	Lafayette	Alumni Field; Orono, ME	W 31–25	3,000	
November 4	at Delaware*	Delaware Stadium; Newark, DE	L 0–48	19,627	
November 11	Lehigh*	Alumni Field; Orono, ME	W 21–20	3,000	
November 18	at Northeastern*	Parsons Field; Brookline, MA	L 19–20		
*Non-conference game; Rankings from Associated Press Poll released prior to the game
