= 1978 Air Force Falcons football team =

American college football season

1978 Air Force Falcons football
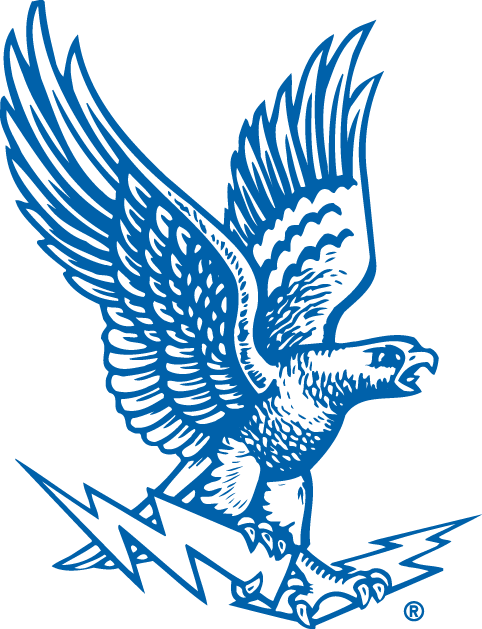
- Conference: Independent
- Record: 3–8
- Head coach: Bill Parcells (1st season)
- Offensive coordinator: Ken Hatfield (1st season)
- Offensive scheme: Wishbone triple option
- Co-defensive coordinators: Dennis Fryzel (1st season); Al Groh (1st season)
- Base defense: 3–4
- Captains: Tom Foertsch; Steve Hoog
- Home stadium: Falcon Stadium

1978 NCAA Division I-A independents football records
	Conf.					Overall
Team	W		L		T	W		L		T
No. 4 Penn State		–		–		11	–	1	–	0
North Texas State		–		–		9	–	2	–	0
East Carolina		–		–		9	–	3	–	0
Navy		–		–		9	–	3	–	0
No. 7 Notre Dame		–		–		9	–	3	–	0
Rutgers		–		–		9	–	3	–	0
Florida State		–		–		8	–	3	–	0
Tennessee State		–		–		8	–	3	–	0
Temple		–		–		7	–	3	–	1
Pittsburgh		–		–		8	–	4	–	0
Holy Cross		–		–		7	–	4	–	0
Louisville		–		–		7	–	4	–	0
UNLV		–		–		7	–	4	–	0
Southern Miss		–		–		7	–	4	–	0
Northeast Louisiana		–		–		6	–	4	–	1
Georgia Tech		–		–		7	–	5	–	0
Hawaii		–		–		6	–	5	–	0
Miami (FL)		–		–		6	–	5	–	0
South Carolina		–		–		5	–	5	–	1
William & Mary		–		–		5	–	5	–	1
Cincinnati		–		–		5	–	6	–	0
Villanova		–		–		5	–	6	–	0
Army		–		–		4	–	6	–	1
Memphis State		–		–		4	–	7	–	0
Tulane		–		–		4	–	7	–	0
Virginia Tech		–		–		4	–	7	–	0
Air Force		–		–		3	–	8	–	0
Colgate		–		–		3	–	8	–	0
Richmond		–		–		3	–	8	–	0
Syracuse		–		–		3	–	8	–	0
Illinois State		–		–		2	–	9	–	0
West Virginia		–		–		2	–	9	–	0
Boston College		–		–		0	–	11	–	0
Rankings from AP Poll

The 1978 Air Force Falcons football team represented the United States Air Force Academy in the 1978 NCAA Division I-A football season as an independent. Future National Football League (NFL) head coach Bill Parcells replaced Ben Martin as head coach in his only season as Air Force head coach. The Falcons played their home games at Falcon Stadium in Colorado Springs, Colorado. They finished the season with a record of 3–8.

== Schedule ==
Date	Time	Opponent	Site	Result	Attendance	Source
September 9		at UTEP	Sun Bowl; El Paso, TX	W 34–25	24,700	
September 16		at Boston College	Alumni Stadium; Chestnut Hill, MA	W 18–7	21,935	
September 23		Holy Cross	Falcon Stadium; Colorado Springs, CO	L 18–35	21,447	
September 30		at Kansas State	KSU Stadium; Manhattan, KS	L 21–34	30,300	
October 7		Navy	Falcon Stadium; Colorado Springs, CO (Commander-in-Chief's Trophy)	L 8–37	30,482	
October 14		Colorado State	Falcon Stadium; Colorado Springs, CO (rivalry)	L 13–31	22,386	
October 21	1:30 p.m.	No. 20 Notre Dame	Falcon Stadium; Colorado Springs, CO (rivalry)	L 15–38	35,425	
October 28		Kent State	Falcon Stadium; Colorado Springs, CO	W 26–10	20,769	
November 4		at Army	Michie Stadium; West Point, NY (Commander-in-Chief's Trophy)	L 14–28	40,115	
November 11		Georgia Tech	Falcon Stadium; Colorado Springs, CO	L 21–42	19,564	
November 18		at Vanderbilt	Dudley Field; Nashville, TN	L 27–41	18,500	
Rankings from AP Poll released prior to the game; All times are in Mountain time

== Roster ==
1978 Air Force Falcons football team roster
Players			Coaches
Offense: Pos. / # / Name / Class	Defense: Pos. / # / Name / Class; S / / Johnny Jackson / Fr	Special teams: Pos. / # / Name / Class	Head coach: Bill Parcells; Coordinators/assistant coaches Legend: (C) Team captain; (S) Suspended; (I) Ineligible; Injured; Redshirt
