= 1978 Northeast Louisiana Indians football team =

American college football season

1978 Northeast Louisiana Indians football
- Conference: Independent
- Record: 6–4–1
- Head coach: John David Crow (3rd season)
- Home stadium: Malone Stadium

1978 NCAA Division I-A independents football records
	Conf.					Overall
Team	W		L		T	W		L		T
No. 4 Penn State		–		–		11	–	1	–	0
North Texas State		–		–		9	–	2	–	0
East Carolina		–		–		9	–	3	–	0
Navy		–		–		9	–	3	–	0
No. 7 Notre Dame		–		–		9	–	3	–	0
Rutgers		–		–		9	–	3	–	0
Florida State		–		–		8	–	3	–	0
Tennessee State		–		–		8	–	3	–	0
Temple		–		–		7	–	3	–	1
Pittsburgh		–		–		8	–	4	–	0
Holy Cross		–		–		7	–	4	–	0
Louisville		–		–		7	–	4	–	0
UNLV		–		–		7	–	4	–	0
Southern Miss		–		–		7	–	4	–	0
Northeast Louisiana		–		–		6	–	4	–	1
Georgia Tech		–		–		7	–	5	–	0
Hawaii		–		–		6	–	5	–	0
Miami (FL)		–		–		6	–	5	–	0
South Carolina		–		–		5	–	5	–	1
William & Mary		–		–		5	–	5	–	1
Cincinnati		–		–		5	–	6	–	0
Villanova		–		–		5	–	6	–	0
Army		–		–		4	–	6	–	1
Memphis State		–		–		4	–	7	–	0
Tulane		–		–		4	–	7	–	0
Virginia Tech		–		–		4	–	7	–	0
Air Force		–		–		3	–	8	–	0
Colgate		–		–		3	–	8	–	0
Richmond		–		–		3	–	8	–	0
Syracuse		–		–		3	–	8	–	0
Illinois State		–		–		2	–	9	–	0
West Virginia		–		–		2	–	9	–	0
Boston College		–		–		0	–	11	–	0
Rankings from AP Poll

The 1978 Northeast Louisiana Indians football team was an American football team that represented Northeast Louisiana University (now known as the University of Louisiana at Monroe) as an independent during the 1978 NCAA Division I-A football season. In their third year under head coach John David Crow, the team compiled a 6–4–1 record.

== Schedule ==
Date	Opponent	Site	Result	Attendance	Source
September 9	at Nicholls State	John L. Guidry Stadium; Thibodaux, LA	W 3–0	3,500	
September 16	Arkansas State	Malone Stadium; Monroe, LA	W 21–13		
September 23	Northern Illinois	Malone Stadium; Monroe, LA	W 27–10		
September 30	Northwestern State	Malone Stadium; Monroe, LA (rivalry)	W 46–0	15,100	
October 7	at Lamar	Cardinal Stadium; Beaumont, TX	T 17–17		
October 14	at McNeese State	Cowboy Stadium; Lake Charles, LA	L 10–31		
October 21	Southeastern Louisiana	Malone Stadium; Monroe, LA	L 21–25		
October 28	Indiana State	Malone Stadium; Monroe, LA	W 14–0		
November 4	at Cincinnati	Nippert Stadium; Cincinnati, OH	L 7–20	6,700	
November 11	at North Texas State	Fouts Field; Denton, TX	L 6–28	14,400	
November 18	Louisiana Tech	Malone Stadium; Monroe, LA (rivalry)	W 18–0	17,000	

== Roster ==
1978 Northeast Louisiana Indians football team roster
Players
Coaches
Offense

Pos.	#	Name	Class
QB	10	Kirby Arceneaux	Sr
QB	5	Bud Cespiva	Jr
WR	4	John Floyd	Sr

Defense

Pos.	#	Name	Class
DB	1	David Dumars	Jr
DB	24	Vic Minor	Jr
DT	83	Ken Poole	So
LB	89	Matt Weiss	So

Special teams

Pos.	#	Name	Class

Head coach

- John David Crow

Coordinators/assistant coaches

- Norman Joseph (assistant)

Legend

- (C) Team captain
- (S) Suspended
- (I) Ineligible
- Injured
- Redshirt
