= 1978 Memphis State Tigers football team =

American college football season

1978 Memphis State Tigers football
- Conference: Independent
- Record: 4–7
- Head coach: Richard Williamson (4th season)
- Offensive coordinator: Jim Ragland (4th season)
- Captains: Earnest Gray; Pete Scatamacchia
- Home stadium: Liberty Bowl Memorial Stadium

1978 NCAA Division I-A independents football records
	Conf.					Overall
Team	W		L		T	W		L		T
No. 4 Penn State		–		–		11	–	1	–	0
North Texas State		–		–		9	–	2	–	0
East Carolina		–		–		9	–	3	–	0
Navy		–		–		9	–	3	–	0
No. 7 Notre Dame		–		–		9	–	3	–	0
Rutgers		–		–		9	–	3	–	0
Florida State		–		–		8	–	3	–	0
Tennessee State		–		–		8	–	3	–	0
Temple		–		–		7	–	3	–	1
Pittsburgh		–		–		8	–	4	–	0
Holy Cross		–		–		7	–	4	–	0
Louisville		–		–		7	–	4	–	0
UNLV		–		–		7	–	4	–	0
Southern Miss		–		–		7	–	4	–	0
Northeast Louisiana		–		–		6	–	4	–	1
Georgia Tech		–		–		7	–	5	–	0
Hawaii		–		–		6	–	5	–	0
Miami (FL)		–		–		6	–	5	–	0
South Carolina		–		–		5	–	5	–	1
William & Mary		–		–		5	–	5	–	1
Cincinnati		–		–		5	–	6	–	0
Villanova		–		–		5	–	6	–	0
Army		–		–		4	–	6	–	1
Memphis State		–		–		4	–	7	–	0
Tulane		–		–		4	–	7	–	0
Virginia Tech		–		–		4	–	7	–	0
Air Force		–		–		3	–	8	–	0
Colgate		–		–		3	–	8	–	0
Richmond		–		–		3	–	8	–	0
Syracuse		–		–		3	–	8	–	0
Illinois State		–		–		2	–	9	–	0
West Virginia		–		–		2	–	9	–	0
Boston College		–		–		0	–	11	–	0
Rankings from AP Poll

The 1978 Memphis State Tigers football team represented Memphis State University (now known as the University of Memphis) as an independent during the 1978 NCAA Division I-A football season. In its fourth season under head coach Richard Williamson, the team compiled a 4–7 record and was outscored by a total of 297 to 200. The team played its home games at Liberty Bowl Memorial Stadium in Memphis, Tennessee.

The team's statistical leaders included Lloyd Patterson with 931 passing yards, Eddie Hill with 739 rushing yards, and Earnest Gray with 690 receiving yards and 54 points scored.

== Schedule ==
Date	Opponent	Site	Result	Attendance	Source
September 9	at Ole Miss	Mississippi Veterans Memorial Stadium; Jackson, MS (rivalry)	L 7–14	47,535	
September 16	Houston	Liberty Bowl Memorial Stadium; Memphis, TN	W 17–3	31,316	
September 23	Mississippi State	Liberty Bowl Memorial Stadium; Memphis, TN	L 14–44	49,238	
September 30	at No. 8 Texas A&M	Kyle Field; College Station, TX	L 0–58	56,818	
October 14	Wichita State	Liberty Bowl Memorial Stadium; Memphis, TN	W 26–13	19,813	
October 21	Southern Miss	Liberty Bowl Memorial Stadium; Memphis, TN (Black and Blue Bowl)	L 10–13	22,630	
October 28	at Tulane	Louisiana Superdome; New Orleans, LA	L 24–41	19,127	
November 4	Vanderbilt^{†}	Liberty Bowl Memorial Stadium; Memphis, TN	W 35–14	22,443	
November 11	at Louisville	Cardinal Stadium; Louisville, KY (rivalry)	W 29–22	17,012	
November 18	at North Texas State	Fouts Field; Denton, TX	L 24–41	13,300	
November 25	Cincinnati	Liberty Bowl Memorial Stadium; Memphis, TN (rivalry)	L 14–34	13,356	
^{†}Homecoming; Rankings from AP Poll released prior to the game
