= 1978 Syracuse Orangemen football team =

American college football season

1978 Syracuse Orangemen football
- Conference: Independent
- Record: 3–8
- Head coach: Frank Maloney (5th season)
- Offensive coordinator: Tom Coughlin (3rd season)
- Captain: Game captains
- Home stadium: Archbold Stadium

1978 NCAA Division I-A independents football records
	Conf.					Overall
Team	W		L		T	W		L		T
No. 4 Penn State		–		–		11	–	1	–	0
North Texas State		–		–		9	–	2	–	0
East Carolina		–		–		9	–	3	–	0
Navy		–		–		9	–	3	–	0
No. 7 Notre Dame		–		–		9	–	3	–	0
Rutgers		–		–		9	–	3	–	0
Florida State		–		–		8	–	3	–	0
Tennessee State		–		–		8	–	3	–	0
Temple		–		–		7	–	3	–	1
Pittsburgh		–		–		8	–	4	–	0
Holy Cross		–		–		7	–	4	–	0
Louisville		–		–		7	–	4	–	0
UNLV		–		–		7	–	4	–	0
Southern Miss		–		–		7	–	4	–	0
Northeast Louisiana		–		–		6	–	4	–	1
Georgia Tech		–		–		7	–	5	–	0
Hawaii		–		–		6	–	5	–	0
Miami (FL)		–		–		6	–	5	–	0
South Carolina		–		–		5	–	5	–	1
William & Mary		–		–		5	–	5	–	1
Cincinnati		–		–		5	–	6	–	0
Villanova		–		–		5	–	6	–	0
Army		–		–		4	–	6	–	1
Memphis State		–		–		4	–	7	–	0
Tulane		–		–		4	–	7	–	0
Virginia Tech		–		–		4	–	7	–	0
Air Force		–		–		3	–	8	–	0
Colgate		–		–		3	–	8	–	0
Richmond		–		–		3	–	8	–	0
Syracuse		–		–		3	–	8	–	0
Illinois State		–		–		2	–	9	–	0
West Virginia		–		–		2	–	9	–	0
Boston College		–		–		0	–	11	–	0
Rankings from AP Poll

The 1978 Syracuse Orangemen football team represented Syracuse University as an independent during the 1978 NCAA Division I-A football season. The team was led by fifth-year head coach Frank Maloney and played their home games at Archbold Stadium in Syracuse, New York. This was the last year that football was played at Archbold Stadium before it was demolished and replaced by the Carrier Dome. The Orangemen finished the season with a record of 3–8.

== Schedule ==
Date	Opponent	Site	Result	Attendance	Source
September 9	No. 17 Florida State	Archbold Stadium; Syracuse, NY	L 0–28	24,272	
September 16	at NC State	Carter Stadium; Raleigh, NC	L 19–27	37,800	
September 23	at Michigan State	Spartan Stadium; East Lansing, MI	L 21–49	74,571	
September 30	Illinois	Archbold Stadium; Syracuse, NY	L 14–28	20,101	
October 7	at West Virginia	Mountaineer Field; Morgantown, WV (rivalry)	W 31–15	32,491	
October 14	No. 10 Maryland	Archbold Stadium; Syracuse, NY	L 9–24	15,079	
October 21	at No. 2 Penn State	Beaver Stadium; University Park, PA (rivalry)	L 15–45	77,827	
November 4	No. 19 Pittsburgh	Archbold Stadium; Syracuse, NY (rivalry)	L 17–18	26,037	
November 11	No. 18 Navy	Archbold Stadium; Syracuse, NY	W 20–17	26,429	
November 18	at Boston College	Alumni Stadium; Chestnut Hill, MA	W 37–23	15,855	
November 25	at Miami (FL)	Miami Orange Bowl; Miami, FL	L 9–21	15,739	
Rankings from AP Poll released prior to the game

== Roster ==
1978 Syracuse Orangemen football team roster
Players
Coaches
Offense

Pos.	#	Name	Class
OT	50	Bruce Babcock	Sr
OT	59	Andrew Gissinger	So
C	54	Joe Hodges	Jr
QB	5	Bill Hurley	Jr
RB	41	Ken Mandeville	So
RB	45	Art Monk	Jr
RB	47	Joe Morris	Fr
TE	81	Tony Sidor	So
QB	11	Dave Warner	Fr
G	51	Glenn Williams	Sr
WR	40	Greg Williams	Jr
QB	9	Tim Wilson	So
G	64	Craig Wolfley	Jr
WR	17	Paul Zambuto	Fr

Defense

Pos.	#	Name	Class
DB	20	Bob Arkellpane	So
DE	94	John Cameron	Jr
LB	33	Jim Collins	So
DE	82	Michael Gyetvay	So
DB	3	Warren Harvey	Jr
DE	43	John Kinley	Jr
LB	58	Ken Kollar	So
LB	97	Fred Lang	So
DB	24	Terry O'Leary	Sr
DB	35	John Patterson	Sr
DE	92	Chris Shaffer	Jr
LB	26	Thomas Seibert	Fr
LB	38	Kevin Yard	So
LB	48	Mike Zunic	So

Special teams

Pos.	#	Name	Class
P	99	Joe Goodwill	So
K	1	Dave Jacobs	Sr

Head coach

- Frank Maloney

Coordinators/assistant coaches

- Tom Coughlin

Legend

- (C) Team captain
- (S) Suspended
- (I) Ineligible
- Injured
- Redshirt
