= 1978 Colgate Red Raiders football team =

American college football season

1978 Colgate Red Raiders football
- Conference: Independent
- Record: 3–8
- Head coach: Frederick Dunlap (3rd season)
- Captains: Doug Curtis; Dick Slenker
- Home stadium: Andy Kerr Stadium

1978 NCAA Division I-A independents football records
	Conf.					Overall
Team	W		L		T	W		L		T
No. 4 Penn State		–		–		11	–	1	–	0
North Texas State		–		–		9	–	2	–	0
East Carolina		–		–		9	–	3	–	0
Navy		–		–		9	–	3	–	0
No. 7 Notre Dame		–		–		9	–	3	–	0
Rutgers		–		–		9	–	3	–	0
Florida State		–		–		8	–	3	–	0
Tennessee State		–		–		8	–	3	–	0
Temple		–		–		7	–	3	–	1
Pittsburgh		–		–		8	–	4	–	0
Holy Cross		–		–		7	–	4	–	0
Louisville		–		–		7	–	4	–	0
UNLV		–		–		7	–	4	–	0
Southern Miss		–		–		7	–	4	–	0
Northeast Louisiana		–		–		6	–	4	–	1
Georgia Tech		–		–		7	–	5	–	0
Hawaii		–		–		6	–	5	–	0
Miami (FL)		–		–		6	–	5	–	0
South Carolina		–		–		5	–	5	–	1
William & Mary		–		–		5	–	5	–	1
Cincinnati		–		–		5	–	6	–	0
Villanova		–		–		5	–	6	–	0
Army		–		–		4	–	6	–	1
Memphis State		–		–		4	–	7	–	0
Tulane		–		–		4	–	7	–	0
Virginia Tech		–		–		4	–	7	–	0
Air Force		–		–		3	–	8	–	0
Colgate		–		–		3	–	8	–	0
Richmond		–		–		3	–	8	–	0
Syracuse		–		–		3	–	8	–	0
Illinois State		–		–		2	–	9	–	0
West Virginia		–		–		2	–	9	–	0
Boston College		–		–		0	–	11	–	0
Rankings from AP Poll

The 1978 Colgate Red Raiders football team was an American football team that represented Colgate University as an independent during the 1978 NCAA Division I-A football season. In its third season under head coach Frederick Dunlap, the team compiled a 3–8 record. Doug Curtis and Dick Slenker were the team captains.

The team played its home games at Andy Kerr Stadium in Hamilton, New York.

== Schedule ==
Date	Opponent	Site	Result	Attendance	Source
September 16	Holy Cross	Andy Kerr Stadium; Hamilton, NY	L 14–27	7,500	
September 23	at Lehigh	Taylor Stadium; Bethlehem, PA	L 7–38	13,500	
September 30	Cornell^{†}	Andy Kerr Stadium; Hamilton, NY (rivalry)	L 12–21	8,500	
October 7	at Harvard	Harvard Stadium; Boston, MA	L 21–24	12,500	
October 14	at Villanova	Villanova Stadium; Villanova, PA	W 20–14	11,200	
October 21	at Princeton	Palmer Stadium; Princeton, NJ	L 12–13	14,005	
October 28	at Army	Michie Stadium; West Point, NY	L 3–28	30,673	
November 4	Lafayette	Andy Kerr Stadium; Hamilton, NY	W 17–7	4,500	
November 11	at Bucknell	Memorial Stadium; Lewisburg, PA	L 0–7	2,500	
November 18	at Delaware	Delaware Stadium; Newark, DE	L 29–38	19,003	
November 25	at Rutgers	Rutgers Stadium; Piscataway, NJ	W 14–9	17,300	
^{†}Homecoming

== Leading players ==
Three trophies were awarded to the Red Raiders' most valuable players in 1978:

- Bruce Nardella, center, received the Andy Kerr Trophy, awarded to the most valuable offensive player.
- Two players received the Hal W. Lahar Trophy, awarded to the most valuable defensive player: Ray Linn, defensive tackle, and Tom McGarrity, defensive back.

Statistical leaders for the 1978 Red Raiders included:

- Rushing: Angelo Colosimo, 792 yards and 9 touchdowns on 205 attempts
- Passing: John Marzo, 1,337 yards, 100 completions and 6 touchdowns on 209 attempts
- Receiving: Two receivers with 36 catches, Dick Slenker (527 yards, 3 touchdowns) and Angelo Colosimo (326 yards, 2 touchdowns)
- Total offense: John Marzo, 1,515 yards (1,337 passing, 178 rushing)
- Scoring: Angelo Colosimo, 68 points from 11 touchdowns and 1 two-point conversion
- All-purpose yards: Angelo Colosimo, 1,127 yards (792 rushing, 326 receiving, 9 kickoff returning)
- Tackles: Doug Curtis, 190 total tackles
- Sacks: Ray Linn, 4 quarterback sacks
