= 1978 Cincinnati Bearcats football team =

American college football season

1978 Cincinnati Bearcats football
- Conference: Independent
- Record: 5–6
- Head coach: Ralph Staub (2nd season)
- Defensive coordinator: Mark Duffner (2nd season)
- Captains: Dwayne Berry; Jim Daley; Howie Kurnick; Mike Rock
- Home stadium: Nippert Stadium

1978 NCAA Division I-A independents football records
	Conf.					Overall
Team	W		L		T	W		L		T
No. 4 Penn State		–		–		11	–	1	–	0
North Texas State		–		–		9	–	2	–	0
East Carolina		–		–		9	–	3	–	0
Navy		–		–		9	–	3	–	0
No. 7 Notre Dame		–		–		9	–	3	–	0
Rutgers		–		–		9	–	3	–	0
Florida State		–		–		8	–	3	–	0
Tennessee State		–		–		8	–	3	–	0
Temple		–		–		7	–	3	–	1
Pittsburgh		–		–		8	–	4	–	0
Holy Cross		–		–		7	–	4	–	0
Louisville		–		–		7	–	4	–	0
UNLV		–		–		7	–	4	–	0
Southern Miss		–		–		7	–	4	–	0
Northeast Louisiana		–		–		6	–	4	–	1
Georgia Tech		–		–		7	–	5	–	0
Hawaii		–		–		6	–	5	–	0
Miami (FL)		–		–		6	–	5	–	0
South Carolina		–		–		5	–	5	–	1
William & Mary		–		–		5	–	5	–	1
Cincinnati		–		–		5	–	6	–	0
Villanova		–		–		5	–	6	–	0
Army		–		–		4	–	6	–	1
Memphis State		–		–		4	–	7	–	0
Tulane		–		–		4	–	7	–	0
Virginia Tech		–		–		4	–	7	–	0
Air Force		–		–		3	–	8	–	0
Colgate		–		–		3	–	8	–	0
Richmond		–		–		3	–	8	–	0
Syracuse		–		–		3	–	8	–	0
Illinois State		–		–		2	–	9	–	0
West Virginia		–		–		2	–	9	–	0
Boston College		–		–		0	–	11	–	0
Rankings from AP Poll

The 1978 Cincinnati Bearcats football team represented University of Cincinnati during 1978 NCAA Division I-A football season. The Bearcats, led by head coach Ralph Staub, participated as independent and played their home games at Nippert Stadium.

== Schedule ==
Date	Opponent	Site	Result	Attendance	Source
September 16	Southern Miss	Nippert Stadium; Cincinnati, OH	W 26–14	10,500	
September 23	Louisville	Nippert Stadium; Cincinnati, OH (The Keg of Nails)	L 14–28		
September 30	at Richmond	City Stadium; Richmond, VA	L 28–51	12,000	
October 7	at No. 18 Florida State	Doak Campbell Stadium; Tallahassee, FL	L 21–26	39,599	
October 14	at Temple	Veterans Stadium; Philadelphia, PA	L 13–16	10,340	
October 21	Tulsa	Nippert Stadium; Cincinnati, OH	L 26–27	11,521	
October 28	at Southwestern Louisiana	Cajun Field; Lafayette, LA	W 38–13		
November 4	Northeast Louisiana	Nippert Stadium; Cincinnati, OH	W 20–7	6,700	
November 11	Ohio^{†}	Nippert Stadium; Cincinnati, OH	W 35–0	14,587	
November 18	at Miami (OH)	Miami Field; Oxford, OH (Victory Bell)	L 24–28		
November 25	at Memphis State	Liberty Bowl Memorial Stadium; Memphis, TN (rivalry)	W 34–14	13,356	
^{†}Homecoming; Rankings from AP Poll released prior to the game
