= 1978 Holy Cross Crusaders football team =

American college football season

1978 Holy Cross Crusaders football
- Conference: Independent
- Record: 7–4
- Head coach: Neil Wheelwright (3rd season)
- Captains: Craig Cerretani; Bob Hurley
- Home stadium: Fitton Field

1978 NCAA Division I-A independents football records
	Conf.					Overall
Team	W		L		T	W		L		T
No. 4 Penn State		–		–		11	–	1	–	0
North Texas State		–		–		9	–	2	–	0
East Carolina		–		–		9	–	3	–	0
Navy		–		–		9	–	3	–	0
No. 7 Notre Dame		–		–		9	–	3	–	0
Rutgers		–		–		9	–	3	–	0
Florida State		–		–		8	–	3	–	0
Tennessee State		–		–		8	–	3	–	0
Temple		–		–		7	–	3	–	1
Pittsburgh		–		–		8	–	4	–	0
Holy Cross		–		–		7	–	4	–	0
Louisville		–		–		7	–	4	–	0
UNLV		–		–		7	–	4	–	0
Southern Miss		–		–		7	–	4	–	0
Northeast Louisiana		–		–		6	–	4	–	1
Georgia Tech		–		–		7	–	5	–	0
Hawaii		–		–		6	–	5	–	0
Miami (FL)		–		–		6	–	5	–	0
South Carolina		–		–		5	–	5	–	1
William & Mary		–		–		5	–	5	–	1
Cincinnati		–		–		5	–	6	–	0
Villanova		–		–		5	–	6	–	0
Army		–		–		4	–	6	–	1
Memphis State		–		–		4	–	7	–	0
Tulane		–		–		4	–	7	–	0
Virginia Tech		–		–		4	–	7	–	0
Air Force		–		–		3	–	8	–	0
Colgate		–		–		3	–	8	–	0
Richmond		–		–		3	–	8	–	0
Syracuse		–		–		3	–	8	–	0
Illinois State		–		–		2	–	9	–	0
West Virginia		–		–		2	–	9	–	0
Boston College		–		–		0	–	11	–	0
Rankings from AP Poll

The 1978 Holy Cross Crusaders football team was an American football team that represented the College of the Holy Cross as an independent during the 1978 NCAA Division I-A football season. Neil Wheelwright returned for his third year as head coach. The team compiled a record of 7–4.

All home games were played at Fitton Field on the Holy Cross campus in Worcester, Massachusetts.

== Schedule ==
Date	Opponent	Site	Result	Attendance	Source
September 9	New Hampshire	Fitton Field; Worcester, MA	W 19–14	14,112	
September 16	at Colgate	Andy Kerr Stadium; Hamilton, NY	W 27–14	7,500	
September 23	at Air Force	Falcon Stadium; Colorado Springs, CO	W 35–18	21,447	
September 30	Dartmouth^{†}	Fitton Field; Worcester, MA	W 35–0	22,024	
October 14	at Army	Michie Stadium; West Point, NY	W 31–0	40,815	
October 28	at Brown	Brown Stadium; Providence, RI	L 25–31	15,000	
November 4	at Boston University	Nickerson Field; Boston, MA	L 7–15	8,760	
November 11	UMass^	Fitton Field; Worcester, MA	L 8–33	20,614	
November 18	Rutgers	Fitton Field; Worcester, MA	L 21–31	14,829	
November 25	Connecticut	Fitton Field; Worcester, MA	W 20–16	8,921	
December 2	at Boston College	Alumni Stadium; Chestnut Hill, MA (rivalry)	W 30–29	28,109	
^{†}Homecoming; ^ Family Weekend

== Statistical leaders ==
Statistical leaders for the 1978 Crusaders included:

- Rushing: Crocky Nangle, 394 yards and 3 touchdowns on 89 attempts
- Passing: Peter Colombo, 1,432 yards, 103 completions and 7 touchdowns on 212 attempts
- Receiving: Chuck Mullen, 587 yards and 6 touchdowns on 40 receptions
- Scoring: Brian Doherty, 42 points from 7 touchdowns
- Total offense: Peter Colombo, 1,517 yards (1,432 passing, 85 rushing)
- All-purpose yards: Larry Ewald, 684 yards (392 rushing, 156 returning, 136 receiving)
- Interceptions: Glenn Verrette, 7 interceptions for 164 yards
