= 1978 West Virginia Mountaineers football team =

American college football season

1978 West Virginia Mountaineers football
- Conference: Independent
- Record: 2–9
- Head coach: Frank Cignetti Sr. (3rd season)
- Home stadium: Mountaineer Field

1978 NCAA Division I-A independents football records
	Conf.					Overall
Team	W		L		T	W		L		T
No. 4 Penn State		–		–		11	–	1	–	0
North Texas State		–		–		9	–	2	–	0
East Carolina		–		–		9	–	3	–	0
Navy		–		–		9	–	3	–	0
No. 7 Notre Dame		–		–		9	–	3	–	0
Rutgers		–		–		9	–	3	–	0
Florida State		–		–		8	–	3	–	0
Tennessee State		–		–		8	–	3	–	0
Temple		–		–		7	–	3	–	1
Pittsburgh		–		–		8	–	4	–	0
Holy Cross		–		–		7	–	4	–	0
Louisville		–		–		7	–	4	–	0
UNLV		–		–		7	–	4	–	0
Southern Miss		–		–		7	–	4	–	0
Northeast Louisiana		–		–		6	–	4	–	1
Georgia Tech		–		–		7	–	5	–	0
Hawaii		–		–		6	–	5	–	0
Miami (FL)		–		–		6	–	5	–	0
South Carolina		–		–		5	–	5	–	1
William & Mary		–		–		5	–	5	–	1
Cincinnati		–		–		5	–	6	–	0
Villanova		–		–		5	–	6	–	0
Army		–		–		4	–	6	–	1
Memphis State		–		–		4	–	7	–	0
Tulane		–		–		4	–	7	–	0
Virginia Tech		–		–		4	–	7	–	0
Air Force		–		–		3	–	8	–	0
Colgate		–		–		3	–	8	–	0
Richmond		–		–		3	–	8	–	0
Syracuse		–		–		3	–	8	–	0
Illinois State		–		–		2	–	9	–	0
West Virginia		–		–		2	–	9	–	0
Boston College		–		–		0	–	11	–	0
Rankings from AP Poll

The 1978 West Virginia Mountaineers football team represented West Virginia University in the 1978 NCAA Division I-A football season. It was the Mountaineers' 86th overall season and they competed as an NCAA Division I-A independent. The team was led by head coach Frank Cignetti Sr., in his third year, and played their home games at Mountaineer Field in Morgantown, West Virginia. They finished the season with a record 2–9.

Cignetti, the father of current Indiana coach Curt Cignetti, hired West Virginia native and future seven-time national championship coach Nick Saban to tutor the Mountaineers' defensive backs.

== Schedule ==
Date	Opponent	Site	Result	Attendance	Source
September 9	Richmond	Mountaineer Field; Morgantown, WV	W 14–12	36,558	
September 16	at No. 3 Oklahoma	Oklahoma Memorial Stadium; Norman, OK	L 10–52	71,187	
September 23	at NC State	Carter Stadium; Raleigh, NC	L 15–29	42,200	
September 30	California	Mountaineer Field; Morgantown, WV	L 21–28	33,190	
October 7	Syracuse^{†}	Mountaineer Field; Morgantown, WV (rivalry)	L 15–31	32,491	
October 14	at Virginia Tech	Lane Stadium; Blacksburg, VA (rivalry)	L 3–16	40,000	
October 21	at Temple	Veterans Stadium; Philadelphia, PA	L 27–28	11,445	
October 28	No. 2 Penn State	Mountaineer Field; Morgantown, WV (rivalry)	L 21–49	34,010	
November 4	Virginia	Mountaineer Field; Morgantown, WV	W 20–17	29,291	
November 11	at No. 20 Pittsburgh	Pitt Stadium; Pittsburgh, PA (rivalry)	L 7–52	53,074	
November 18	at Colorado State	Hughes Stadium; Fort Collins, CO	L 14–50	12,782	
^{†}Homecoming; Rankings from AP Poll released prior to the game

== Roster ==
1978 West Virginia Mountaineers football team roster
Players			Coaches
Offense: Pos. / # / Name / Class; RB / / Terry Bowden	Defense: Pos. / # / Name / Class; DB / 27 / Jerry Holmes / Jr	Special teams: Pos. / # / Name / Class	Head coach: Frank Cignetti; Coordinators/assistant coaches: Nick Saban; Legend: (C) Team captain; (S) Suspended; (I) Ineligible; Injured; Redshirt
