= 1978 Temple Owls football team =

American college football season

1978 Temple Owls football
- Conference: Independent
- Record: 7–3–1
- Head coach: Wayne Hardin (9th season)
- Home stadium: Veterans Stadium

1978 NCAA Division I-A independents football records
	Conf.					Overall
Team	W		L		T	W		L		T
No. 4 Penn State		–		–		11	–	1	–	0
North Texas State		–		–		9	–	2	–	0
East Carolina		–		–		9	–	3	–	0
Navy		–		–		9	–	3	–	0
No. 7 Notre Dame		–		–		9	–	3	–	0
Rutgers		–		–		9	–	3	–	0
Florida State		–		–		8	–	3	–	0
Tennessee State		–		–		8	–	3	–	0
Temple		–		–		7	–	3	–	1
Pittsburgh		–		–		8	–	4	–	0
Holy Cross		–		–		7	–	4	–	0
Louisville		–		–		7	–	4	–	0
UNLV		–		–		7	–	4	–	0
Southern Miss		–		–		7	–	4	–	0
Northeast Louisiana		–		–		6	–	4	–	1
Georgia Tech		–		–		7	–	5	–	0
Hawaii		–		–		6	–	5	–	0
Miami (FL)		–		–		6	–	5	–	0
South Carolina		–		–		5	–	5	–	1
William & Mary		–		–		5	–	5	–	1
Cincinnati		–		–		5	–	6	–	0
Villanova		–		–		5	–	6	–	0
Army		–		–		4	–	6	–	1
Memphis State		–		–		4	–	7	–	0
Tulane		–		–		4	–	7	–	0
Virginia Tech		–		–		4	–	7	–	0
Air Force		–		–		3	–	8	–	0
Colgate		–		–		3	–	8	–	0
Richmond		–		–		3	–	8	–	0
Syracuse		–		–		3	–	8	–	0
Illinois State		–		–		2	–	9	–	0
West Virginia		–		–		2	–	9	–	0
Boston College		–		–		0	–	11	–	0
Rankings from AP Poll

The 1978 Temple Owls football team was an American football team that represented Temple University as an independent during the 1978 NCAA Division I-A football season. In its ninth season under head coach Wayne Hardin, the team compiled a 7–3–1 record and outscored opponents by a total of 280 to 203. The team played its home games at Veterans Stadium in Philadelphia.

The team's statistical leaders included Brian Broomell with 1,362 passing yards, Zachary Dixon with 1,153 rushing yards and 60 points scored, and Steve Watson with 637 receiving yards.

== Schedule ==
Date	Opponent	Site	Result	Attendance	Source
September 1	No. 3 Penn State	Veterans Stadium; Philadelphia, PA	L 7–10	53,103	
September 16	at Drake	Drake Stadium; Des Moines, IA	W 36–29	9,345	
September 23	at No. 11 Pittsburgh	Pitt Stadium; Pittsburgh PA	L 12–20	43,445	
September 30	Delaware	Veterans Stadium; Philadelphia, PA	W 38–7	26,745	
October 7	at William & Mary	Cary Field; Williamsburg, VA	T 22–22	13,000	
October 14	Cincinnati	Veterans Stadium; Philadelphia, PA	W 16–13	10,340	
October 21	West Virginia	Veterans Stadium; Philadelphia, PA	W 28–27	11,445	
November 4	at No. 6 (D-II) Akron	Rubber Bowl; Akron, OH	W 56–21	10,467	
November 11	at Rutgers	Rutgers Stadium; Piscataway, NJ	L 10–13	22,000	
November 18	Villanova	Veterans Stadium; Philadelphia, PA (Mayor's Cup)	W 27–17		
December 10	vs. Boston College	Korakuen Stadium; Tokyo, Japan (Mirage Bowl)	W 28–24	55,000	
Rankings from AP Poll released prior to the game

== Roster ==
1978 Temple Owls football team roster
Players
Coaches
Offense

Pos.	#	Name	Class
RB	25	Anthony Anderson	Sr
QB	12	Brian Broomell	Jr
RB	28	Zachary Dixon	Sr
WR	84	Steve Watson	Sr

Defense

Pos.	#	Name	Class
LB	54	Mike Curcio	Jr
DB	16	Mark McCants	So
LB	50	Mike Fuoco	So
DB/LB	43	Brett Hardenstine	So

Special teams

Pos.	#	Name	Class

Head coach

- Wayne Hardin

Coordinators/assistant coaches

Legend

- (C) Team captain
- (S) Suspended
- (I) Ineligible
- Injured
- Redshirt
