= 1978 Rhode Island Rams football team =

American college football season

1978 Rhode Island Rams football
- Conference: Yankee Conference

Ranking
- AP: No. T–9
- Record: 7–3 (3–2 Yankee)
- Head coach: Bob Griffin (3rd season)
- Defensive coordinator: Pete Adrian (3rd season)
- Home stadium: Meade Stadium

1978 Yankee Conference football standings
	Conf.					Overall
Team	W		L		T	W		L		T
No. T–4 UMass $^	5	–	0	–	0	9	–	4	–	0
No. 7 Rhode Island	3	–	2	–	0	7	–	3	–	0
Connecticut	3	–	2	–	0	4	–	7	–	0
Boston University	2	–	3	–	0	6	–	4	–	0
New Hampshire	1	–	3	–	1	6	–	4	–	1
Maine	0	–	4	–	1	3	–	7	–	1
$ – Conference champion; ^ – NCAA Division I-AA playoff participant; Rankings from Associated Press poll

The 1978 Rhode Island Rams football team was an American football team that represented the University of Rhode Island in the Yankee Conference during the 1978 NCAA Division I-AA football season. In their third season under head coach Bob Griffin, the Rams compiled a 7–3 record (3–2 against conference opponents) and finished in a tie for second place in the conference.

== Schedule ==
Date	Opponent	Rank	Site	Result	Attendance	Source
September 9	at Delaware*		Delaware Stadium; Newark, DE	L 0–37	18,584	
September 16	Northeastern*		Brown Stadium; Providence, RI	W 27–13	1,750	
September 30	at Brown*		Brown Stadium; Providence, RI (rivalry)	W 17–3	8,500	
October 7	at Maine	No. T–10	Alumni Stadium; Orono, ME	W 47–0	7,600	
October 14	Virginia Union*	No. 10	Meade Stadium; Kingston, RI	W 3–0	2,178	
October 21	No. 10 UMass^{†}	No. 8	Meade Stadium; Kingston, RI	L 17–19	7,995	
October 28	No. T–9 Boston University		Meade Stadium; Kingston, RI	W 7–6	8,033	
November 4	at New Hampshire		Cowell Stadium; Durham, NH	W 19–14	9,730	
November 11	No. T–9 Merchant Marine*		Meade Stadium; Kingston, RI	W 34–7	6,161	
November 18	at Connecticut	No. 7	Memorial Stadium; Storrs, CT (rivalry)	L 6–31	7,038	
*Non-conference game; ^{†}Homecoming; Rankings from Associated Press Poll released prior to the game
