= 1978 Tulane Green Wave football team =

American college football season

1978 Tulane Green Wave football
- Conference: Independent
- Record: 4–7
- Head coach: Larry Smith (3rd season)
- Defensive coordinator: Moe Ankney (3rd season)
- Home stadium: Louisiana Superdome

1978 NCAA Division I-A independents football records
	Conf.					Overall
Team	W		L		T	W		L		T
No. 4 Penn State		–		–		11	–	1	–	0
North Texas State		–		–		9	–	2	–	0
East Carolina		–		–		9	–	3	–	0
Navy		–		–		9	–	3	–	0
No. 7 Notre Dame		–		–		9	–	3	–	0
Rutgers		–		–		9	–	3	–	0
Florida State		–		–		8	–	3	–	0
Tennessee State		–		–		8	–	3	–	0
Temple		–		–		7	–	3	–	1
Pittsburgh		–		–		8	–	4	–	0
Holy Cross		–		–		7	–	4	–	0
Louisville		–		–		7	–	4	–	0
UNLV		–		–		7	–	4	–	0
Southern Miss		–		–		7	–	4	–	0
Northeast Louisiana		–		–		6	–	4	–	1
Georgia Tech		–		–		7	–	5	–	0
Hawaii		–		–		6	–	5	–	0
Miami (FL)		–		–		6	–	5	–	0
South Carolina		–		–		5	–	5	–	1
William & Mary		–		–		5	–	5	–	1
Cincinnati		–		–		5	–	6	–	0
Villanova		–		–		5	–	6	–	0
Army		–		–		4	–	6	–	1
Memphis State		–		–		4	–	7	–	0
Tulane		–		–		4	–	7	–	0
Virginia Tech		–		–		4	–	7	–	0
Air Force		–		–		3	–	8	–	0
Colgate		–		–		3	–	8	–	0
Richmond		–		–		3	–	8	–	0
Syracuse		–		–		3	–	8	–	0
Illinois State		–		–		2	–	9	–	0
West Virginia		–		–		2	–	9	–	0
Boston College		–		–		0	–	11	–	0
Rankings from AP Poll

The 1978 Tulane Green Wave football team was an American football team that represented Tulane University during the 1978 NCAA Division I-A football season as an independent. In their third year under head coach Larry Smith, the team compiled a 4–7 record.

== Schedule ==
Date	Opponent	Site	Result	Attendance	Source
September 9	at Maryland	Byrd Stadium; College Park, MD	L 7–31	31,458	
September 16	No. 14 Pittsburgh	Louisiana Superdome; New Orleans, LA	L 6–24	32,658	
September 23	at Georgia Tech	Grant Field; Atlanta, GA	L 17–27	25,805	
September 30	at No. 20 Stanford	Stanford Stadium; Stanford, CA	L 14–17	40,111	
October 7	at Vanderbilt	Dudley Field; Nashville, TN	W 38–3	27,600	
October 14	Boston College	Louisiana Superdome; New Orleans, LA	W 9–3	27,177	
October 21	TCU	Louisiana Superdome; New Orleans, LA	L 7–13	22,748	
October 28	Memphis State	Louisiana Superdome; New Orleans, LA	W 41–24	19,127	
November 4	Miami (FL)	Louisiana Superdome; New Orleans, LA	W 20–16	20,045	
November 11	at Ole Miss	Hemingway Stadium; Oxford, MS (rivalry)	L 3–13	28,500	
November 25	at LSU	Tiger Stadium; Baton Rouge, LA (Battle for the Rag)	L 21–40	75,876	
Rankings from AP Poll released prior to the game
