= 1978 Connecticut Huskies football team =

American college football season

1978 Connecticut Huskies football
- Conference: Yankee Conference
- Record: 4–7 (3–3 Yankee)
- Head coach: Walt Nadzak (2nd season)
- Home stadium: Memorial Stadium

1978 Yankee Conference football standings
	Conf.					Overall
Team	W		L		T	W		L		T
No. T–4 UMass $^	5	–	0	–	0	9	–	4	–	0
No. 7 Rhode Island	3	–	2	–	0	7	–	3	–	0
Connecticut	3	–	2	–	0	4	–	7	–	0
Boston University	2	–	3	–	0	6	–	4	–	0
New Hampshire	1	–	3	–	1	6	–	4	–	1
Maine	0	–	4	–	1	3	–	7	–	1
$ – Conference champion; ^ – NCAA Division I-AA playoff participant; Rankings from Associated Press poll

The 1978 Connecticut Huskies football team represented the University of Connecticut in the 1978 NCAA Division I-AA football season. The Huskies were led by second year head coach Walt Nadzak, and completed the season with a record of 4–7.

== Schedule ==
Date	Opponent	Site	Result	Attendance	Source
September 9	Northeastern*	Memorial Stadium; Storrs, CT	W 21–19		
September 16	William & Mary*	Memorial Stadium; Storrs, CT	L 3–27	5,030	
September 23	Navy*	Memorial Stadium; Storrs, CT	L 0–30		
September 30	at Yale*	Yale Bowl; New Haven, CT	L 7–21	23,431	
October 7	at New Hampshire	Cowell Stadium; Durham, NH	L 17–25		
October 14	at Rutgers*	Rutgers Stadium; Piscataway, NJ	L 0–10	13,500	
October 21	Maine	Memorial Stadium; Storrs, CT	W 49–7		
October 28	at No. 6 UMass	Alumni Stadium; Amherst, MA (rivalry)	L 10–17	14,200	
November 11	Boston University	Memorial Stadium; Storrs, CT	W 27–20		
November 18	No. 7 Rhode Island	Memorial Stadium; Storrs, CT (rivalry)	W 31–6	7,038	
November 25	at Holy Cross*	Fitton Field; Worcester, MA	L 16–20	8,921	
*Non-conference game; Rankings from AP Poll released prior to the game
