= 1978 Lehigh Engineers football team =

American college football season

1978 Lehigh Engineers football
- Conference: Independent

Ranking
- AP: No. 9
- Record: 8–3
- Head coach: John Whitehead (3rd season)
- Captains: Bill Bradley; Pete DeLuca
- Home stadium: Taylor Stadium

1978 NCAA Division I-AA independents football standings
	Conf.			Overall
Team	W	L	T	W		L		T
No. 1 Nevada ^		–		11	–	1	–	0
No. 9 Lehigh		–		8	–	3	–	0
Northeastern		–		6	–	5	–	0
Bucknell		–		5	–	5	–	0
Northwestern State		–		5	–	6	–	0
Portland State		–		5	–	6	–	0
Lafayette		–		4	–	7	–	0
^ – NCAA Division I-AA playoff participant; Rankings from Associated Press poll

The 1978 Lehigh Engineers football team was an American football team that represented Lehigh University as an independent during the 1978 NCAA Division I-AA football season.

In their third year under head coach John Whitehead, the Engineers compiled an 8–3 record. Bill Bradley and Pete DeLuca were the team captains.

Lehigh had won the NCAA Division II Football Championship in 1977, and in 1978 the Engineers moved up to the newly formed Division I-AA, later to be renamed the Football Championship Subdivision. Also moving up from Division II, and competing as I-AA independents, were in-state rivals Bucknell and Lafayette. The Engineers' 1978 schedule included opponents from Division I-A, Division I-AA, Division II and Division III.

Lehigh played its home games at Taylor Stadium on the university's main campus in Bethlehem, Pennsylvania.

== Schedule ==
Date	Opponent	Rank	Site	Result	Attendance	Source
September 9	West Chester		Taylor Stadium; Bethlehem, PA	W 23–20	11,900	
September 16	at Slippery Rock		N. Kerr Thompson Stadium; Slippery Rock, PA	W 17–0		
September 23	Colgate	No. 1	Taylor Stadium; Bethlehem, PA	W 38–7	13,500	
September 29	at Penn	No. 1	Franklin Field; Philadelphia, PA	L 13–21	14,158	
October 7	Delaware	No. 6	Taylor Stadium; Bethlehem, PA (rivalry)	W 27–17	14,000	
October 14	Davidson^	No. 6	Taylor Stadium; Bethlehem, PA	W 27–21	9,000	
October 21	at VMI	No. 5	Alumni Memorial Field; Lexington, VA	W 14–10	8,400	
October 28	Bucknell	No. 3	Taylor Stadium; Bethlehem, PA	L 6–13	11,000	
November 4	C.W. Post	No. 8	Taylor Stadium; Bethlehem, PA	W 24–22	9,000	
November 11	at Maine	No. 6	Alumni Field; Orono, ME	L 18–21	3,000	
November 18	at Lafayette		Fisher Field; Easton, PA (The Rivalry)	W 25–15	17,000	
^ Parents Day; Rankings from Associated Press Poll released prior to the game

== Rankings ==
Ranking movements Legend: ██ Increase in ranking ██ Decrease in ranking — = Not ranked
	Week									
Poll	1	2	3	4	5	6	7	8	9	Final
AP	1	1	6	6	5	3	8	6	—	9
