= 1978 Hawaii Rainbow Warriors football team =

American college football season

1978 Hawaii Rainbow Warriors football
- Conference: Independent
- Record: 6–5
- Head coach: Dick Tomey (2nd season)
- Defensive coordinator: Bob Burt (2nd season)
- Home stadium: Aloha Stadium

1978 NCAA Division I-A independents football records
	Conf.					Overall
Team	W		L		T	W		L		T
No. 4 Penn State		–		–		11	–	1	–	0
North Texas State		–		–		9	–	2	–	0
East Carolina		–		–		9	–	3	–	0
Navy		–		–		9	–	3	–	0
No. 7 Notre Dame		–		–		9	–	3	–	0
Rutgers		–		–		9	–	3	–	0
Florida State		–		–		8	–	3	–	0
Tennessee State		–		–		8	–	3	–	0
Temple		–		–		7	–	3	–	1
Pittsburgh		–		–		8	–	4	–	0
Holy Cross		–		–		7	–	4	–	0
Louisville		–		–		7	–	4	–	0
UNLV		–		–		7	–	4	–	0
Southern Miss		–		–		7	–	4	–	0
Northeast Louisiana		–		–		6	–	4	–	1
Georgia Tech		–		–		7	–	5	–	0
Hawaii		–		–		6	–	5	–	0
Miami (FL)		–		–		6	–	5	–	0
South Carolina		–		–		5	–	5	–	1
William & Mary		–		–		5	–	5	–	1
Cincinnati		–		–		5	–	6	–	0
Villanova		–		–		5	–	6	–	0
Army		–		–		4	–	6	–	1
Memphis State		–		–		4	–	7	–	0
Tulane		–		–		4	–	7	–	0
Virginia Tech		–		–		4	–	7	–	0
Air Force		–		–		3	–	8	–	0
Colgate		–		–		3	–	8	–	0
Richmond		–		–		3	–	8	–	0
Syracuse		–		–		3	–	8	–	0
Illinois State		–		–		2	–	9	–	0
West Virginia		–		–		2	–	9	–	0
Boston College		–		–		0	–	11	–	0
Rankings from AP Poll

The 1978 Hawaii Rainbow Warriors football team represented the University of Hawaiʻi at Mānoa as an independent during the 1978 NCAA Division I-A football season. In their second season under head coach Dick Tomey, the Rainbow Warriors compiled a 6–5 record.

== Schedule ==
Date	Opponent	Site	Result	Attendance	Source
September 9	New Mexico	Aloha Stadium; Halawa, HI	W 22–16	40,701	
September 16	at No. 12 Nebraska	Memorial Stadium; Lincoln, NE	L 10–56	75,615	
September 30	Cal State Fullerton	Aloha Stadium; Halawa, HI	W 42–33	36,618	
October 7	San Jose State	Aloha Stadium; Halawa, HI (rivalry)	W 25–11	36,049	
October 14	at UNLV	Las Vegas Silver Bowl; Whitney, NV	L 20–30	17,010	
October 28	Pacific (CA)^{†}	Aloha Stadium; Halawa, HI	L 17–27	36,867	
November 4	UTEP	Aloha Stadium; Halawa, HI	W 35–13	27,240	
November 11	New Mexico State	Aloha Stadium; Halawa, HI	W 35–20	25,193	
November 18	Wyoming	Aloha Stadium; Halawa, HI (rivalry)	W 27–22	40,182	
November 25	BYU	Aloha Stadium; Halawa, HI	L 13–31	35,678	
December 2	No. 3 USC	Aloha Stadium; Halawa, HI	L 5–21	48,767	
^{†}Homecoming; Rankings from Coaches' Poll released prior to the game
