= 1978 Boston College Eagles football team =

American college football season

1978 Boston College Eagles football
- Conference: Independent
- Record: 0–11
- Head coach: Ed Chlebek (1st season)
- Captains: Paul McCarty; John Schmeding; Fred Smerlas
- Home stadium: Alumni Stadium

1978 NCAA Division I-A independents football records
	Conf.					Overall
Team	W		L		T	W		L		T
No. 4 Penn State		–		–		11	–	1	–	0
North Texas State		–		–		9	–	2	–	0
East Carolina		–		–		9	–	3	–	0
Navy		–		–		9	–	3	–	0
No. 7 Notre Dame		–		–		9	–	3	–	0
Rutgers		–		–		9	–	3	–	0
Florida State		–		–		8	–	3	–	0
Tennessee State		–		–		8	–	3	–	0
Temple		–		–		7	–	3	–	1
Pittsburgh		–		–		8	–	4	–	0
Holy Cross		–		–		7	–	4	–	0
Louisville		–		–		7	–	4	–	0
UNLV		–		–		7	–	4	–	0
Southern Miss		–		–		7	–	4	–	0
Northeast Louisiana		–		–		6	–	4	–	1
Georgia Tech		–		–		7	–	5	–	0
Hawaii		–		–		6	–	5	–	0
Miami (FL)		–		–		6	–	5	–	0
South Carolina		–		–		5	–	5	–	1
William & Mary		–		–		5	–	5	–	1
Cincinnati		–		–		5	–	6	–	0
Villanova		–		–		5	–	6	–	0
Army		–		–		4	–	6	–	1
Memphis State		–		–		4	–	7	–	0
Tulane		–		–		4	–	7	–	0
Virginia Tech		–		–		4	–	7	–	0
Air Force		–		–		3	–	8	–	0
Colgate		–		–		3	–	8	–	0
Richmond		–		–		3	–	8	–	0
Syracuse		–		–		3	–	8	–	0
Illinois State		–		–		2	–	9	–	0
West Virginia		–		–		2	–	9	–	0
Boston College		–		–		0	–	11	–	0
Rankings from AP Poll

The 1978 Boston College Eagles football team represented Boston College as an independent during the 1978 NCAA Division I-A football season. The team compiled a 0–11 record and were outscored by a total of 294 to 153. The team compiled the worst record in Division I-A during the 1978 season. Five of the team's games were lost in late stages. The team traveled to Tokyo to play in the Mirage Bowl on December 10.

Ed Chlebek was hired as the team's head coach in January 1978, after having coached at Eastern Michigan for two years; he was named the Mid-America Conference coach of the year in 1977.

The team's statistical leaders included Jay Palazola with 926 passing yards, Anthony Brown with 748 rushing yards, and Paul McCarty with 531 receiving yards.

The team played its home games at Alumni Stadium in Chestnut Hill, Massachusetts.

== Schedule ==
Date	Opponent	Site	Result	Attendance	Source
September 16	Air Force	Alumni Stadium; Chestnut Hill, MA	L 7–18	21,935	
September 23	No. 9 Texas A&M	Alumni Stadium; Chestnut Hill, MA	L 2–37	26,012	
September 30	Navy	Alumni Stadium; Chestnut Hill, MA	L 8–19	24,082	
October 7	No. 9 Pittsburgh	Alumni Stadium; Chestnut Hill, MA	L 15–32	21,673	
October 14	at Tulane	Louisiana Superdome; New Orleans, LA	L 3–9	27,177	
November 4	at Villanova	Villanova Stadium; Villanova, PA	L 16–28	13,300	
November 11	at Army	Michie Stadium; West Point, NY	L 26–29	28,049	
November 18	Syracuse	Alumni Stadium; Chestnut Hill, MA	L 23–37	15,855	
November 25	at UMass	Alumni Stadium (rivalry); Hadley, MA	L 0–27	7,950	
December 2	Holy Cross	Alumni Stadium; Chestnut Hill, MA (rivalry)	L 29–30	28,109	
December 10	vs. Temple	Korakuen Stadium; Tokyo, Japan (Mirage Bowl)	L 24–28	55,000	
Rankings from AP Poll released prior to the game

== Roster ==
1978 Boston College Eagles football team roster
Players
Coaches
Offense

Pos.	#	Name	Class
TE	87	Tom Carr	Jr
WR	24	Jim O'Brien	Sr
OT	72	Jim Rourke	Sr
TE	83	Tim Sherwin	So
OT	64	Karl Swanke	Jr

Defense

Pos.	#	Name	Class
DL	91	Bill Ohrenberger	Sr
DT	89	Mark Roopenian	So
DT	71	Fred Smerlas	Sr

Special teams

Pos.	#	Name	Class

Head coach

- Ed Chlebek

Coordinators/assistant coaches

Legend

- (C) Team captain
- (S) Suspended
- (I) Ineligible
- Injured
- Redshirt
