= 1978 Illinois State Redbirds football team =

American college football season

1978 Illinois State Redbirds football
- Conference: Independent
- Record: 2–9
- Head coach: Charlie Cowdrey (2nd season)
- Home stadium: Hancock Stadium

1978 NCAA Division I-A independents football records
	Conf.					Overall
Team	W		L		T	W		L		T
No. 4 Penn State		–		–		11	–	1	–	0
North Texas State		–		–		9	–	2	–	0
East Carolina		–		–		9	–	3	–	0
Navy		–		–		9	–	3	–	0
No. 7 Notre Dame		–		–		9	–	3	–	0
Rutgers		–		–		9	–	3	–	0
Florida State		–		–		8	–	3	–	0
Tennessee State		–		–		8	–	3	–	0
Temple		–		–		7	–	3	–	1
Pittsburgh		–		–		8	–	4	–	0
Holy Cross		–		–		7	–	4	–	0
Louisville		–		–		7	–	4	–	0
UNLV		–		–		7	–	4	–	0
Southern Miss		–		–		7	–	4	–	0
Northeast Louisiana		–		–		6	–	4	–	1
Georgia Tech		–		–		7	–	5	–	0
Hawaii		–		–		6	–	5	–	0
Miami (FL)		–		–		6	–	5	–	0
South Carolina		–		–		5	–	5	–	1
William & Mary		–		–		5	–	5	–	1
Cincinnati		–		–		5	–	6	–	0
Villanova		–		–		5	–	6	–	0
Army		–		–		4	–	6	–	1
Memphis State		–		–		4	–	7	–	0
Tulane		–		–		4	–	7	–	0
Virginia Tech		–		–		4	–	7	–	0
Air Force		–		–		3	–	8	–	0
Colgate		–		–		3	–	8	–	0
Richmond		–		–		3	–	8	–	0
Syracuse		–		–		3	–	8	–	0
Illinois State		–		–		2	–	9	–	0
West Virginia		–		–		2	–	9	–	0
Boston College		–		–		0	–	11	–	0
Rankings from AP Poll

The 1978 Illinois State Redbirds football team represented Illinois State University as an independent during the 1978 NCAA Division I-A football season. Led by second-year head coach Charlie Cowdrey, the Redbirds compiled a record of 2–9.

== Schedule ==
Date	Opponent	Site	Result	Attendance	Source
September 9	at Western Michigan	Waldo Stadium; Kalamazoo, MI	L 17–27	19,500	
September 16	Western Kentucky	Hancock Stadium; Normal, IL	L 6–28	12,000	
September 23	at Kent State	Dix Stadium; Kent, OH	L 3–34	4,108	
September 30	at Northern Illinois	Huskie Stadium; DeKalb, IL	L 21–49		
October 7	Southern Illinois	Hancock Stadium; Normal, IL	L 0–26	13,500	
October 14	at Central Michigan	Perry Shorts Stadium; Mount Pleasant, MI	L 7–45		
October 21	Ball State	Hancock Stadium; Normal, IL	L 7–14	8,500	
October 28	at Western Illinois	Hanson Field; Macomb, IL	L 20–26		
November 4	at No. 9 Eastern Illinois	O'Brien Stadium; Charleston, IL (rivalry)	L 7–42	9,000	
November 11	Indiana State	Hancock Stadium; Normal, IL	W 27–14	4,500	
November 18	Eastern Michigan	Hancock Stadium; Normal, IL	W 14–13	2,600	
Rankings from Associated Press Poll released prior to the game
