= 1978 New Hampshire Wildcats football team =

American college football season

1978 New Hampshire Wildcats football
- Conference: Yankee Conference
- Record: 6–4–1 (1–3–1 Yankee)
- Head coach: Bill Bowes (7th season)
- Home stadium: Cowell Stadium

1978 Yankee Conference football standings
	Conf.					Overall
Team	W		L		T	W		L		T
No. T–4 UMass $^	5	–	0	–	0	9	–	4	–	0
No. 7 Rhode Island	3	–	2	–	0	7	–	3	–	0
Connecticut	3	–	2	–	0	4	–	7	–	0
Boston University	2	–	3	–	0	6	–	4	–	0
New Hampshire	1	–	3	–	1	6	–	4	–	1
Maine	0	–	4	–	1	3	–	7	–	1
$ – Conference champion; ^ – NCAA Division I-AA playoff participant; Rankings from Associated Press poll

The 1978 New Hampshire Wildcats football team was an American football team that represented the University of New Hampshire as a member of the Yankee Conference during the 1978 NCAA Division I-AA football season. In its seventh year under head coach Bill Bowes, the team compiled a 6–4–1 record (1–3–1 against conference opponents) and finished fifth out of six teams in the Yankee Conference.

== Schedule ==
Date	Opponent	Site	Result	Attendance	Source
September 9	at Holy Cross	Fitton Field; Worcester, MA	L 14–19	14,112	
September 16	at Central Connecticut*	Arute Field; New Britain, CT	W 36–13	5,000	
September 23	Boston University	Cowell Stadium; Durham, NH	L 5–15		
September 30	at West Chester*	John A. Farrell Stadium; West Chester, PA	W 21–0		
October 7	Connecticut	Cowell Stadium; Durham, NH	W 25–17		
October 14	at Maine	Alumni Field; Orono, ME (rivalry)	T 7–7	8,200	
October 21	at American International*	Miller Field; Springfield, MA	W 10–7	3,885	
October 28	at Northeastern*	Parsons Field; Brookline, MA	W 29–21		
November 4	Rhode Island	Cowell Stadium; Durham, NH	L 14–19	9,730	
November 11	Springfield*	Cowell Stadium; Durham, NH	W 56–35		
November 18	at No. 9 UMass	Alumni Stadium; Hadley, MA (rivalry)	L 7–34	11,300	
*Non-conference game; Rankings from AP Poll released prior to the game
