= 1978 Virginia Tech Gobblers football team =

American college football season

1978 Virginia Tech Gobblers football
- Conference: Independent
- Record: 4–7
- Head coach: Bill Dooley (1st season)
- Home stadium: Lane Stadium

1978 NCAA Division I-A independents football records
| | Conf. | | | | | Overall |
| Team | W | | L | | T | W | | L | | T |
|---|---|---|---|---|---|---|---|---|---|---|
| No. 4 Penn State | | – | | – | | 11 | – | 1 | – | 0 |
| North Texas State | | – | | – | | 9 | – | 2 | – | 0 |
| East Carolina | | – | | – | | 9 | – | 3 | – | 0 |
| Navy | | – | | – | | 9 | – | 3 | – | 0 |
| No. 7 Notre Dame | | – | | – | | 9 | – | 3 | – | 0 |
| Rutgers | | – | | – | | 9 | – | 3 | – | 0 |
| Florida State | | – | | – | | 8 | – | 3 | – | 0 |
| Tennessee State | | – | | – | | 8 | – | 3 | – | 0 |
| Temple | | – | | – | | 7 | – | 3 | – | 1 |
| Pittsburgh | | – | | – | | 8 | – | 4 | – | 0 |
| Holy Cross | | – | | – | | 7 | – | 4 | – | 0 |
| Louisville | | – | | – | | 7 | – | 4 | – | 0 |
| UNLV | | – | | – | | 7 | – | 4 | – | 0 |
| Southern Miss | | – | | – | | 7 | – | 4 | – | 0 |
| Northeast Louisiana | | – | | – | | 6 | – | 4 | – | 1 |
| Georgia Tech | | – | | – | | 7 | – | 5 | – | 0 |
| Hawaii | | – | | – | | 6 | – | 5 | – | 0 |
| Miami (FL) | | – | | – | | 6 | – | 5 | – | 0 |
| South Carolina | | – | | – | | 5 | – | 5 | – | 1 |
| William & Mary | | – | | – | | 5 | – | 5 | – | 1 |
| Cincinnati | | – | | – | | 5 | – | 6 | – | 0 |
| Villanova | | – | | – | | 5 | – | 6 | – | 0 |
| Army | | – | | – | | 4 | – | 6 | – | 1 |
| Memphis State | | – | | – | | 4 | – | 7 | – | 0 |
| Tulane | | – | | – | | 4 | – | 7 | – | 0 |
| Virginia Tech | | – | | – | | 4 | – | 7 | – | 0 |
| Air Force | | – | | – | | 3 | – | 8 | – | 0 |
| Colgate | | – | | – | | 3 | – | 8 | – | 0 |
| Richmond | | – | | – | | 3 | – | 8 | – | 0 |
| Syracuse | | – | | – | | 3 | – | 8 | – | 0 |
| Illinois State | | – | | – | | 2 | – | 9 | – | 0 |
| West Virginia | | – | | – | | 2 | – | 9 | – | 0 |
| Boston College | | – | | – | | 0 | – | 11 | – | 0 |
Rankings from AP Poll

The 1978 Virginia Tech Gobblers football team was an American football team that represented Virginia Tech as an independent during the 1978 NCAA Division I-A football season. In their first year under head coach Bill Dooley, the Gobblers compiled an overall record of 4–7.

== Schedule ==
| Date | Opponent | Site | TV | Result | Attendance | Source |
|---|---|---|---|---|---|---|
| September 9 | Tulsa | Lane Stadium; Blacksburg, Virginia | | L 33–35 | 26,000 | |
| September 16 | at Wake Forest | Groves Stadium; Winston-Salem, NC | | W 28–6 | 22,750 | |
| September 23 | Auburn | Lane Stadium; Blacksburg, VA | | L 7–18 | 38,000 | |
| September 30 | William & Mary | Lane Stadium; Blacksburg, VA | | W 22–19 | 34,000 | |
| October 7 | at Clemson | Memorial Stadium; Clemson, SC | ABC | L 7–38 | 53,054 | |
| October 14 | West Virginia^{†} | Lane Stadium; Blacksburg, VA (rivalry) | | W 16–3 | 40,000 | |
| October 21 | at Virginia | Scott Stadium; Charlottesville, VA (rivalry) | | L 7–17 | 34,275 | |
| October 28 | at No. 3 Alabama | Bryant–Denny Stadium; Tuscaloosa, AL | | L 0–35 | 60,210 | |
| November 4 | Kentucky | Lane Stadium; Blacksburg, VA | | L 0–28 | 36,000 | |
| November 11 | at Florida State | Doak Campbell Stadium; Tallahassee, FL | | L 14–24 | 38,654 | |
| November 18 | VMI | Lane Stadium; Blacksburg, VA (rivalry) | | W 28–2 | 20,000 | |
^{†}Homecoming; Rankings from AP Poll released prior to the game

== Roster ==
The following players were members of the 1978 football team.

1978 Virginia Tech roster
| Chris Albrittain; Zack Apkarian; Jeff Bailey; Gippy Belcher; Greg Birtsch; Brown; Gene Bunn; Steve Casey; Chris Cosh; David Stephen Dolphin; Scott Dovel; John Drinkard; Paul Engle; Larry Fallen; Michel Faulkner; 88 Mickey Fitzgerald; John Gambone; Danny Hill; Dickie Holway; Michael James Hughes; James Johnson; Mathew Dane "Chip" Keatley; Mike Kenley | Eric King; Kent Knupp; Mike Kovac; David Lamie; Don LaRue; John Latina; Ed Lewis; Kenny Lewis Sr.; Ron Luraschi; Carl McDonald; Doug McDougald; Matt Mead; Bucky Methfessel; Wayne Mutter; Charles Novell; Jerome Pannell; Nate Parker; Nick Rapone; Mickey Rogers; Mike Romagnoli; Joe Sansone | Ellis Savage; Mike Scharnus; Dennis Scott; Jerry Sheehan; Dave Smigelsky; Gary Smith; Gary Smith; Henry Smith; Tory Smith; Sidney Snell; Lewis Stuart; Craig Van Schoick; Roe Waldron; Leonard Walker; Paul Watkins; Tom Webb; Denny Windmuller; Steve Wirt; Lawrence Young; Ron Zollicoffer; Michael Edward Zouzalik |
