= 1978 South Carolina Gamecocks football team =

American college football season

1978 South Carolina Gamecocks football
- Conference: Independent
- Record: 5–5–1
- Head coach: Jim Carlen (4th season)
- Defensive coordinator: Richard Bell (4th season)
- Home stadium: Williams–Brice Stadium

1978 NCAA Division I-A independents football records
	Conf.					Overall
Team	W		L		T	W		L		T
No. 4 Penn State		–		–		11	–	1	–	0
North Texas State		–		–		9	–	2	–	0
East Carolina		–		–		9	–	3	–	0
Navy		–		–		9	–	3	–	0
No. 7 Notre Dame		–		–		9	–	3	–	0
Rutgers		–		–		9	–	3	–	0
Florida State		–		–		8	–	3	–	0
Tennessee State		–		–		8	–	3	–	0
Temple		–		–		7	–	3	–	1
Pittsburgh		–		–		8	–	4	–	0
Holy Cross		–		–		7	–	4	–	0
Louisville		–		–		7	–	4	–	0
UNLV		–		–		7	–	4	–	0
Southern Miss		–		–		7	–	4	–	0
Northeast Louisiana		–		–		6	–	4	–	1
Georgia Tech		–		–		7	–	5	–	0
Hawaii		–		–		6	–	5	–	0
Miami (FL)		–		–		6	–	5	–	0
South Carolina		–		–		5	–	5	–	1
William & Mary		–		–		5	–	5	–	1
Cincinnati		–		–		5	–	6	–	0
Villanova		–		–		5	–	6	–	0
Army		–		–		4	–	6	–	1
Memphis State		–		–		4	–	7	–	0
Tulane		–		–		4	–	7	–	0
Virginia Tech		–		–		4	–	7	–	0
Air Force		–		–		3	–	8	–	0
Colgate		–		–		3	–	8	–	0
Richmond		–		–		3	–	8	–	0
Syracuse		–		–		3	–	8	–	0
Illinois State		–		–		2	–	9	–	0
West Virginia		–		–		2	–	9	–	0
Boston College		–		–		0	–	11	–	0
Rankings from AP Poll

The 1978 South Carolina Gamecocks football team represented the University of South Carolina as an independent during the 1978 NCAA Division I-A football season. Led by fourth-year head coach Jim Carlen, the Gamecocks compiled a record of 5–5–1. The team played its home games at Williams–Brice Stadium.

The Gamecocks had a second consecutive non-winning season, highlighted by an upset over No. 19 Georgia.

== Schedule ==
Date	Opponent	Site	Result	Attendance	Source
September 9	Furman	Williams–Brice Stadium; Columbia, SC	W 45–10	50,239	
September 16	No. 17 Kentucky	Williams–Brice Stadium; Columbia, SC	T 14–14	56,385	
September 23	at Duke	Wallace Wade Stadium; Durham, NC	L 12–16	33,895	
September 30	No. 19 Georgia	Williams–Brice Stadium; Columbia, SC (rivalry)	W 27–10	56,514	
October 7	at Georgia Tech	Grant Field; Atlanta, GA	L 3–6	36,129	
October 14	Ohio	Williams–Brice Stadium; Columbia, SC	W 24–7	50,188	
October 21	Ole Miss	Williams–Brice Stadium; Columbia, SC	W 18–17	50,226	
October 28	North Carolina	Williams–Brice Stadium; Columbia, SC (rivalry)	L 22–24	55,104	
November 4	at NC State	Carter Stadium; Raleigh, NC	L 13–22	34,400	
November 18	Wake Forest	Williams–Brice Stadium; Columbia, SC	W 37–14	42,762	
November 25	at No. 10 Clemson	Memorial Stadium; Clemson, SC (rivalry)	L 23–41	63,050–63,479	
Rankings from AP Poll released prior to the game

== Roster ==
1978 South Carolina Gamecocks football team roster
Players			Coaches
Offense: Pos. / # / Name / Class; RB / 38 / George Rogers / So	Defense: Pos. / # / Name / Class; DB / 22 / Mark Dantonio / Sr	Special teams: Pos. / # / Name / Class	Head coach: Jim Carlen; Coordinators/assistant coaches Legend: (C) Team captain; (S) Suspended; (I) Ineligible; Injured; Redshirt
