= 1978 Tennessee State Tigers football team =

American college football season

1978 Tennessee State Tigers football
- Conference: Independent
- Record: 8–3
- Head coach: John Merritt (16th season)
- Home stadium: Hale Stadium; Dudley Field

1978 NCAA Division I-A independents football records
	Conf.					Overall
Team	W		L		T	W		L		T
No. 4 Penn State		–		–		11	–	1	–	0
North Texas State		–		–		9	–	2	–	0
East Carolina		–		–		9	–	3	–	0
Navy		–		–		9	–	3	–	0
No. 7 Notre Dame		–		–		9	–	3	–	0
Rutgers		–		–		9	–	3	–	0
Florida State		–		–		8	–	3	–	0
Tennessee State		–		–		8	–	3	–	0
Temple		–		–		7	–	3	–	1
Pittsburgh		–		–		8	–	4	–	0
Holy Cross		–		–		7	–	4	–	0
Louisville		–		–		7	–	4	–	0
UNLV		–		–		7	–	4	–	0
Southern Miss		–		–		7	–	4	–	0
Northeast Louisiana		–		–		6	–	4	–	1
Georgia Tech		–		–		7	–	5	–	0
Hawaii		–		–		6	–	5	–	0
Miami (FL)		–		–		6	–	5	–	0
South Carolina		–		–		5	–	5	–	1
William & Mary		–		–		5	–	5	–	1
Cincinnati		–		–		5	–	6	–	0
Villanova		–		–		5	–	6	–	0
Army		–		–		4	–	6	–	1
Memphis State		–		–		4	–	7	–	0
Tulane		–		–		4	–	7	–	0
Virginia Tech		–		–		4	–	7	–	0
Air Force		–		–		3	–	8	–	0
Colgate		–		–		3	–	8	–	0
Richmond		–		–		3	–	8	–	0
Syracuse		–		–		3	–	8	–	0
Illinois State		–		–		2	–	9	–	0
West Virginia		–		–		2	–	9	–	0
Boston College		–		–		0	–	11	–	0
Rankings from AP Poll

The 1978 Tennessee State Tigers football team represented Tennessee State University as an independent during the 1978 NCAA Division I-A football season. In their 16th year under head coach John Merritt, the team compiled an overall record of 8–3.

== Schedule ==
Date	Opponent	Site	Result	Attendance	Source
September 2	Middle Tennessee	Dudley Field; Nashville, TN	W 13–6		
September 9	Jackson State	Dudley Field; Nashville, TN	L 24–35	17,000	
September 16	Alabama A&M	Hale Stadium; Nashville, TN	W 20–0		
September 23	at Texas Southern	Astrodome; Houston, TX	L 0–16		
September 30	at Central State (OH)	McPherson Stadium; Wilberforce, OH	W 13–11	5,300	
October 7	at Grambling State	Grambling Stadium; Grambling, LA	L 11–16		
October 21	at No. 4 Florida A&M	Doak Campbell Stadium; Tallahassee, FL	W 24–21	29,820	
October 28	Southern	Hale Stadium; Nashville, TN	W 30–13		
November 4	vs. North Carolina Central	RFK Stadium; Washington, DC	W 41–7	8,500	
November 11	Cameron	Hale Stadium; Nashville, TN	W 34–0		
November 18	Chattanooga	Hale Stadium; Nashville, TN	W 27–23	10,000	
Rankings from Associated Press Poll released prior to the game
