= 1978 North Texas State Mean Green football team =

American college football season

1978 North Texas State Mean Green football
- Conference: Independent
- Record: 9–2
- Head coach: Hayden Fry (6th season)
- Home stadium: Fouts Field, Texas Stadium

1978 NCAA Division I-A independents football records
	Conf.					Overall
Team	W		L		T	W		L		T
No. 4 Penn State		–		–		11	–	1	–	0
North Texas State		–		–		9	–	2	–	0
East Carolina		–		–		9	–	3	–	0
Navy		–		–		9	–	3	–	0
No. 7 Notre Dame		–		–		9	–	3	–	0
Rutgers		–		–		9	–	3	–	0
Florida State		–		–		8	–	3	–	0
Tennessee State		–		–		8	–	3	–	0
Temple		–		–		7	–	3	–	1
Pittsburgh		–		–		8	–	4	–	0
Holy Cross		–		–		7	–	4	–	0
Louisville		–		–		7	–	4	–	0
UNLV		–		–		7	–	4	–	0
Southern Miss		–		–		7	–	4	–	0
Northeast Louisiana		–		–		6	–	4	–	1
Georgia Tech		–		–		7	–	5	–	0
Hawaii		–		–		6	–	5	–	0
Miami (FL)		–		–		6	–	5	–	0
South Carolina		–		–		5	–	5	–	1
William & Mary		–		–		5	–	5	–	1
Cincinnati		–		–		5	–	6	–	0
Villanova		–		–		5	–	6	–	0
Army		–		–		4	–	6	–	1
Memphis State		–		–		4	–	7	–	0
Tulane		–		–		4	–	7	–	0
Virginia Tech		–		–		4	–	7	–	0
Air Force		–		–		3	–	8	–	0
Colgate		–		–		3	–	8	–	0
Richmond		–		–		3	–	8	–	0
Syracuse		–		–		3	–	8	–	0
Illinois State		–		–		2	–	9	–	0
West Virginia		–		–		2	–	9	–	0
Boston College		–		–		0	–	11	–	0
Rankings from AP Poll

The 1978 North Texas State Mean Green football team represented North Texas State University—now known as the University of North Texas—during the 1978 NCAA Division I-A football season. In its sixth and final season under head coach Hayden Fry, the team compiled a 9–2 record. The team primarily played its home games at Fouts Field in Denton, Texas, and three other games at Texas Stadium in Irving, Texas.

This would mark the final season North Texas State played more than two games, home or neutral, at Texas Stadium (the home of the Dallas Cowboys at the time) after SMU gained full-time access to the venue in 1979.

== Schedule ==
Date	Opponent	Site	Result	Attendance	Source
September 2	UTEP	Fouts Field; Denton, TX	W 49–0	17,200	
September 9	Mississippi State	Texas Stadium; Irving, TX	L 5–17	21,000	
September 16	vs. UT Arlington	Texas Stadium; Irving, TX	W 28–23	16,821	
September 23	at New Mexico State	Aggie Memorial Stadium; Las Cruces, NM	W 22–21	13,196	
September 30	Oklahoma State	Texas Stadium; Irving, TX	W 12–7	21,800	
October 7	at West Texas State	Kimbrough Memorial Stadium; Canyon, TX	W 35–0	17,660	
October 14	at No. 12 Texas	Texas Memorial Stadium; Austin, TX	L 16–26	63,000	
October 28	at Louisiana Tech	State Fair Stadium; Shreveport, LA	W 16–14	6,510	
November 4	Southern Miss^{†}	Fouts Field; Denton, TX	W 25–12	18,400	
November 11	Northeast Louisiana	Fouts Field; Denton, TX	W 28–6	14,400	
November 18	Memphis State	Fouts Field; Denton, TX	W 41–24	13,300	
^{†}Homecoming; Rankings from AP Poll released prior to the game

== Game summaries ==
=== At Texas ===
North Texas State at Texas

Team	1	2	3	4	Total
Mean Green	7	2	7	0	16
• No. 12 Longhorns	0	16	7	3	26

- Date: October 14
- Location: Texas Memorial Stadium, Austin, Texas
- Game start: 7:01 pm CDT
- Elapsed time: 2:33
- Game attendance: 63,000
- Game weather: 71 °F (22 °C), Clear, Wind N 5 mph (8.0 km/h)

Scoring summary
1	6:13	UNT	Murray 38-yard pass from Case (Hamm kick)	UNT 7–0
2	13:32	UNT	Safety (Erxleben fumbled out of end zone)	UNT 9–0
2	1:48	TEX	Jam Jones 1-yard run (Erxleben kick)	UNT 9–7
2	1:06	TEX	Safety (Snap out of end zone)	Tied 9–9
2	0:17	TEX	Lam Jones 41-yard pass from McEachern (Erxleben kick)	Texas 16–9
3	8:31	TEX	Studdard 13-yard pass from McEachern (Erxleben kick)	Texas 23–9
3	3:10	UNT	Jackson 2-yard run (Hamm kick)	Texas 23–16
4	2:37	TEX	Erxleben 47-yard field goal	Texas 26–16

== Roster ==
1978 North Texas Mean Green football team roster
Players
Coaches
Offense

Pos.	#	Name	Class
QB	8	Jordan Case	Jr
RB		Bernard Jackson	Jr

Defense

Pos.	#	Name	Class
DL		Reginald Lewis	Sr
LB		Burks Washington	Sr

Special teams

Pos.	#	Name	Class

Head coach

- Hayden Fry

Coordinators/assistant coaches

- Bill Brashier
- Bill Snyder

Legend

- (C) Team captain
- (S) Suspended
- (I) Ineligible
- Injured
- Redshirt

== Team players in the 1979 NFL draft ==
Player	Position	Round	Pick	NFL club
Reginald Lewis	DE	3	78	Tampa Bay Buccaneers
