= 1978 UNLV Rebels football team =

American college football season

1978 UNLV Rebels football
- Conference: Independent
- Record: 7–4
- Head coach: Tony Knap (3rd season)
- Home stadium: Las Vegas Silver Bowl

1978 NCAA Division I-A independents football records
	Conf.					Overall
Team	W		L		T	W		L		T
No. 4 Penn State		–		–		11	–	1	–	0
North Texas State		–		–		9	–	2	–	0
East Carolina		–		–		9	–	3	–	0
Navy		–		–		9	–	3	–	0
No. 7 Notre Dame		–		–		9	–	3	–	0
Rutgers		–		–		9	–	3	–	0
Florida State		–		–		8	–	3	–	0
Tennessee State		–		–		8	–	3	–	0
Temple		–		–		7	–	3	–	1
Pittsburgh		–		–		8	–	4	–	0
Holy Cross		–		–		7	–	4	–	0
Louisville		–		–		7	–	4	–	0
UNLV		–		–		7	–	4	–	0
Southern Miss		–		–		7	–	4	–	0
Northeast Louisiana		–		–		6	–	4	–	1
Georgia Tech		–		–		7	–	5	–	0
Hawaii		–		–		6	–	5	–	0
Miami (FL)		–		–		6	–	5	–	0
South Carolina		–		–		5	–	5	–	1
William & Mary		–		–		5	–	5	–	1
Cincinnati		–		–		5	–	6	–	0
Villanova		–		–		5	–	6	–	0
Army		–		–		4	–	6	–	1
Memphis State		–		–		4	–	7	–	0
Tulane		–		–		4	–	7	–	0
Virginia Tech		–		–		4	–	7	–	0
Air Force		–		–		3	–	8	–	0
Colgate		–		–		3	–	8	–	0
Richmond		–		–		3	–	8	–	0
Syracuse		–		–		3	–	8	–	0
Illinois State		–		–		2	–	9	–	0
West Virginia		–		–		2	–	9	–	0
Boston College		–		–		0	–	11	–	0
Rankings from AP Poll

The 1978 UNLV Rebels football team was an American football team that represented the University of Nevada, Las Vegas as an independent during the 1978 NCAA Division I-A football season. In their third year under head coach Tony Knap, the team compiled a 7–4 record.

== Schedule ==
Date	Opponent	Site	Result	Attendance	Source
September 9	at Washington State	Joe Albi Stadium; Spokane, WA	L 7–34	25,250	
September 16	Nevada	Las Vegas Silver Bowl; Whitney, NV (Fremont Cannon)	L 14–23	20,910	
September 23	at New Mexico	University Stadium; Albuquerque, NM	L 0–24	17,291	
October 7	Idaho	Las Vegas Silver Bowl; Whitney, NV	W 53–14	18,944	
October 14	Hawaii	Las Vegas Silver Bowl; Whitney, NV	W 30–20	17,010	
October 21	at Colorado State	Hughes Stadium; Fort Collins, CO	W 33–6	21,585	
October 28	Montana	Las Vegas Silver Bowl; Whitney, NV	W 25–16	17,058	
November 11	Wyoming	Las Vegas Silver Bowl; Whitney, NV	W 12–10	18,374	
November 18	UTEP	Las Vegas Silver Bowl; Whitney, NV	W 27–0	15,610	
November 25	Cal State Fullerton	Las Vegas Silver Bowl; Whitney, NV	W 24–7	14,896	
December 2	vs. BYU	Yokohama Stadium; Yokohama, Japan (Yokohama Bowl)	L 24–28	27,500	
