= 1978 Richmond Spiders football team =

American college football season

1978 Richmond Spiders football
- Conference: Independent
- Record: 3–8
- Head coach: Jim Tait (5th season)
- Captains: Jeff Nixon; Ray Chase
- Home stadium: City Stadium

1978 NCAA Division I-A independents football records
	Conf.					Overall
Team	W		L		T	W		L		T
No. 4 Penn State		–		–		11	–	1	–	0
North Texas State		–		–		9	–	2	–	0
East Carolina		–		–		9	–	3	–	0
Navy		–		–		9	–	3	–	0
No. 7 Notre Dame		–		–		9	–	3	–	0
Rutgers		–		–		9	–	3	–	0
Florida State		–		–		8	–	3	–	0
Tennessee State		–		–		8	–	3	–	0
Temple		–		–		7	–	3	–	1
Pittsburgh		–		–		8	–	4	–	0
Holy Cross		–		–		7	–	4	–	0
Louisville		–		–		7	–	4	–	0
UNLV		–		–		7	–	4	–	0
Southern Miss		–		–		7	–	4	–	0
Northeast Louisiana		–		–		6	–	4	–	1
Georgia Tech		–		–		7	–	5	–	0
Hawaii		–		–		6	–	5	–	0
Miami (FL)		–		–		6	–	5	–	0
South Carolina		–		–		5	–	5	–	1
William & Mary		–		–		5	–	5	–	1
Cincinnati		–		–		5	–	6	–	0
Villanova		–		–		5	–	6	–	0
Army		–		–		4	–	6	–	1
Memphis State		–		–		4	–	7	–	0
Tulane		–		–		4	–	7	–	0
Virginia Tech		–		–		4	–	7	–	0
Air Force		–		–		3	–	8	–	0
Colgate		–		–		3	–	8	–	0
Richmond		–		–		3	–	8	–	0
Syracuse		–		–		3	–	8	–	0
Illinois State		–		–		2	–	9	–	0
West Virginia		–		–		2	–	9	–	0
Boston College		–		–		0	–	11	–	0
Rankings from AP Poll

The 1978 Richmond Spiders football team was an American football team that represented the University of Richmond as an independent during the 1978 NCAA Division I-A football season. In their fifth season under head coach Jim Tait, Richmond compiled a 3–8 record.

== Schedule ==
Date	Opponent	Site	Result	Attendance	Source
September 2	Southern Miss	City Stadium; Richmond, VA	L 7–10	15,000	
September 9	at West Virginia	Mountaineer Field; Morgantown, WV	L 12–14	36,558	
September 16	at Wisconsin	Camp Randall Stadium; Madison, WI	L 6–7	60,877	
September 23	at Appalachian State	Conrad Stadium; Boone, NC	L 19–24	8,416	
September 30	Cincinnati	City Stadium; Richmond, VA	W 51–28	12,000	
October 7	at Villanova	Villanova Stadium; Villanova, PA	L 14–17		
October 14	VMI	City Stadium; Richmond, VA (Tobacco Bowl/rivalry)	L 6–23	20,000	
October 21	vs. East Carolina	Foreman Field; Norfolk, VA (Oyster Bowl)	L 14–21	23,000	
November 4	North Carolina	City Stadium; Richmond, VA	W 27–18	15,000	
November 11	at Chattanooga	Chamberlain Field; Chattanooga, TN	L 3–30		
November 18	William & Mary	City Stadium; Richmond, VA (rivalry)	W 17–3	17,500	
