= 1978 Rutgers Scarlet Knights football team =

American college football season

1978 Rutgers Scarlet Knights football

Garden State Bowl, L 18–34 vs. Arizona State
- Conference: Independent
- Record: 9–3
- Head coach: Frank R. Burns (6th season)
- Offensive coordinator: Bill Speranza (2nd season)
- Defensive coordinator: Bob Naso (11th season)
- Home stadium: Rutgers Stadium; Giants Stadium

1978 NCAA Division I-A independents football records
	Conf.					Overall
Team	W		L		T	W		L		T
No. 4 Penn State		–		–		11	–	1	–	0
North Texas State		–		–		9	–	2	–	0
East Carolina		–		–		9	–	3	–	0
Navy		–		–		9	–	3	–	0
No. 7 Notre Dame		–		–		9	–	3	–	0
Rutgers		–		–		9	–	3	–	0
Florida State		–		–		8	–	3	–	0
Tennessee State		–		–		8	–	3	–	0
Temple		–		–		7	–	3	–	1
Pittsburgh		–		–		8	–	4	–	0
Holy Cross		–		–		7	–	4	–	0
Louisville		–		–		7	–	4	–	0
UNLV		–		–		7	–	4	–	0
Southern Miss		–		–		7	–	4	–	0
Northeast Louisiana		–		–		6	–	4	–	1
Georgia Tech		–		–		7	–	5	–	0
Hawaii		–		–		6	–	5	–	0
Miami (FL)		–		–		6	–	5	–	0
South Carolina		–		–		5	–	5	–	1
William & Mary		–		–		5	–	5	–	1
Cincinnati		–		–		5	–	6	–	0
Villanova		–		–		5	–	6	–	0
Army		–		–		4	–	6	–	1
Memphis State		–		–		4	–	7	–	0
Tulane		–		–		4	–	7	–	0
Virginia Tech		–		–		4	–	7	–	0
Air Force		–		–		3	–	8	–	0
Colgate		–		–		3	–	8	–	0
Richmond		–		–		3	–	8	–	0
Syracuse		–		–		3	–	8	–	0
Illinois State		–		–		2	–	9	–	0
West Virginia		–		–		2	–	9	–	0
Boston College		–		–		0	–	11	–	0
Rankings from AP Poll

The 1978 Rutgers Scarlet Knights football team represented Rutgers University as an independent during the 1978 NCAA Division I-A football season. In their sixth season under head coach Frank R. Burns, the Scarlet Knights compiled a 9–3 record while competing as an independent. The team outscored its opponents 284 to 165 and finished the season with a 34–18 loss to Arizona State in the Garden State Bowl. The team's statistical leaders included Bob Hering with 1,193 passing yards, Glen Kehler with 883 rushing yards, and David Dorn with 535 receiving yards. It was the Scarlet Knights' first major bowl appearance.

== Schedule ==
Date	Time	Opponent	Site	Result	Attendance	Source
September 9	1:30 p.m.	at No. 3 Penn State	Beaver Stadium; University Park, PA	L 17–20	77,154	
September 23	1:30 p.m.	at Bucknell	Memorial Stadium; Lewisburg, PA	W 27–13	9,500	
September 30	1:30 p.m.	Princeton	Giants Stadium; East Rutherford, NJ (rivalry)	W 24–0	25,307	
October 7	1:30 p.m.	at Yale	Yale Bowl; New Haven, CT	W 28–27	21,000	
October 14	1:30 p.m.	Connecticut	Rutgers Stadium; Piscataway, NJ	W 10–0	13,500	
October 21	1:30 p.m.	Villanova^{†}	Rutgers Stadium; Piscataway, NJ	W 24–9	18,500	
October 28	1:30 p.m.	Columbia	Giants Stadium; East Rutherford, NJ	W 69–0	7,665	
November 4	1:00 p.m.	at UMass	Warren McGuirk Alumni Stadium; Hadley, MA	W 21–11	9,800	
November 11	1:00 p.m.	Temple	Rutgers Stadium; Piscataway, NJ	W 13–10	22,000	
November 18	1:30 p.m.	at Holy Cross	Fitton Field; Worcester, MA	W 31–21	14,829	
November 25	1:00 p.m.	Colgate	Rutgers Stadium; Piscataway, NJ	L 9–14	17,300	
December 16		vs. Arizona State	Giants Stadium; East Rutherford, NJ (Garden State Bowl)	L 18–34	33,402	
^{†}Homecoming; Rankings from AP Poll released prior to the game; All times are in Eastern time

== Coaching staff ==
- Head coach: Frank R. Burns
- Offensive coordinator: Bill Speranza
- Offensive line coach: James Taigia
- Wide receivers coach: Dick Curl
- Defensive coordinator: Bob Naso
- Defensive backs coach: Pete Savino
- Defensive line coach: Ted Cottrell
- Graduate assistant: Greg Gigantino
