= 1978 East Carolina Pirates football team =

American college football season

1978 East Carolina Pirates football

Independence Bowl, W 35–13 vs. Louisiana Tech
- Conference: Independent
- Record: 9–3
- Head coach: Pat Dye (5th season)
- Home stadium: Ficklen Memorial Stadium

1978 NCAA Division I-A independents football records
	Conf.					Overall
Team	W		L		T	W		L		T
No. 4 Penn State		–		–		11	–	1	–	0
North Texas State		–		–		9	–	2	–	0
East Carolina		–		–		9	–	3	–	0
Navy		–		–		9	–	3	–	0
No. 7 Notre Dame		–		–		9	–	3	–	0
Rutgers		–		–		9	–	3	–	0
Florida State		–		–		8	–	3	–	0
Tennessee State		–		–		8	–	3	–	0
Temple		–		–		7	–	3	–	1
Pittsburgh		–		–		8	–	4	–	0
Holy Cross		–		–		7	–	4	–	0
Louisville		–		–		7	–	4	–	0
UNLV		–		–		7	–	4	–	0
Southern Miss		–		–		7	–	4	–	0
Northeast Louisiana		–		–		6	–	4	–	1
Georgia Tech		–		–		7	–	5	–	0
Hawaii		–		–		6	–	5	–	0
Miami (FL)		–		–		6	–	5	–	0
South Carolina		–		–		5	–	5	–	1
William & Mary		–		–		5	–	5	–	1
Cincinnati		–		–		5	–	6	–	0
Villanova		–		–		5	–	6	–	0
Army		–		–		4	–	6	–	1
Memphis State		–		–		4	–	7	–	0
Tulane		–		–		4	–	7	–	0
Virginia Tech		–		–		4	–	7	–	0
Air Force		–		–		3	–	8	–	0
Colgate		–		–		3	–	8	–	0
Richmond		–		–		3	–	8	–	0
Syracuse		–		–		3	–	8	–	0
Illinois State		–		–		2	–	9	–	0
West Virginia		–		–		2	–	9	–	0
Boston College		–		–		0	–	11	–	0
Rankings from AP Poll

The 1978 East Carolina Pirates football team was an American football team that represented East Carolina University as an independent during the 1978 NCAA Division I-A football season. In their fifth season under head coach Pat Dye, the team compiled a 9–3 record.

== Schedule ==
Date	Opponent	Site	Result	Attendance	Source
September 2	Western Carolina	Ficklen Memorial Stadium; Greenville, NC	W 14–6	31,251	
September 9	at NC State	Carter Stadium; Raleigh, NC (rivalry)	L 13–29	50,800	
September 16	at North Carolina	Kenan Memorial Stadium; Chapel Hill, NC	L 10–14	51,150	
September 23	at Southwestern Louisiana	Cajun Field; Lafayette, LA	W 38–9	14,103	
September 30	UT Arlington	Ficklen Memorial Stadium; Greenville, NC	W 23–17	25,986	
October 7	at VMI	Alumni Memorial Field; Lexington, VA	W 19–6	6,900	
October 14	at Southern Miss	M. M. Roberts Stadium; Hattiesburg, MS	L 16–17	15,632	
October 21	vs. Richmond	Foreman Field; Norfolk, VA (Oyster Bowl)	W 21–14	23,000	
November 4	Appalachian State	Ficklen Memorial Stadium; Greenville, NC	W 33–8	19,726	
November 11	William & Mary	Ficklen Memorial Stadium; Greenville, NC	W 20–3	26,231	
November 18	Marshall	Ficklen Memorial Stadium; Greenville, NC	W 45–0	22,450	
December 16	vs. Louisiana Tech	State Fair Stadium; Shreveport, LA (Independence Bowl)	W 35–13	18,200	
