= 1978 UMass Minutemen football team =

American college football season

1978 UMass Minutemen football

Yankee Conference champion Lambert Cup winner

NCAA Division I-AA Championship Game, L 28–35 vs. Florida A&M
- Conference: Yankee Conference

Ranking
- AP: No. T–4
- Record: 9–4 (5–0 Yankee)
- Head coach: Bob Pickett (1st season)
- Defensive coordinator: Jim Reid (1st season)
- Home stadium: Alumni Stadium

1978 Yankee Conference football standings
	Conf.					Overall
Team	W		L		T	W		L		T
No. T–4 UMass $^	5	–	0	–	0	9	–	4	–	0
No. 7 Rhode Island	3	–	2	–	0	7	–	3	–	0
Connecticut	3	–	2	–	0	4	–	7	–	0
Boston University	2	–	3	–	0	6	–	4	–	0
New Hampshire	1	–	3	–	1	6	–	4	–	1
Maine	0	–	4	–	1	3	–	7	–	1
$ – Conference champion; ^ – NCAA Division I-AA playoff participant; Rankings from Associated Press poll

The 1978 UMass Minutemen football team represented the University of Massachusetts Amherst in the 1978 NCAA Division I-AA football season as a member of the Yankee Conference. The team was coached by Bob Pickett and played its home games at Alumni Stadium in Hadley, Massachusetts. The 1978 season was the first after the NCAA split Division I football into two subdivisions, and the first that featured a postseason playoff for Division I-AA. The Minutemen reached this inaugural championship game, losing to Florida A&M, 35–28. UMass finished the season with a record of 9–4 overall and 5–0 in conference play.

== Schedule ==
Date	Opponent	Rank	Site	TV	Result	Attendance	Source
September 16	Villanova*		Alumni Stadium; Hadley, MA		L 21–25	8,800	
September 23	at Maine		Alumni Stadium; Orono, ME		W 40–6	7,200	
September 30	at Harvard*		Harvard Stadium; Boston, MA		L 0–10	12,200	
October 7	Morgan State*		Alumni Stadium; Hadley, MA		W 38–6	6,700	
October 14	at No. 5 Boston University		Nickerson Field; Boston, MA		W 31–7	3,570	
October 21	at No. 8 Rhode Island	No. 10	Meade Stadium; Kingston, RI		W 19–17	7,995	
October 28	Connecticut	No. 6	Alumni Stadium; Hadley, MA (rivalry)		W 17–10	14,200	
November 4	Rutgers*	No. 4	Alumni Stadium; Hadley, MA		L 11–21	9,800	
November 11	at Holy Cross*		Fitton Field; Worcester, MA		W 33–8	20,614	
November 18	New Hampshire	No. 9	Alumni Stadium; Hadley, MA (rivalry)		W 34–7	11,300	
November 25	Boston College*	No. T–4	Alumni Stadium; Hadley, MA (rivalry)		W 27–0	7,950	
December 9	at No. 1 Nevada*	No. T–4	Mackay Stadium; Reno, NV (NCAA Division I-AA Semifinal)		W 44–21	14,026	
December 16	vs. No. 3 Florida A&M*	No. T–4	Memorial Stadium; Wichita Falls, TX (NCAA Division I-AA Championship Game—Pioneer Bowl)	ABC	L 28–35	13,604	
*Non-conference game; Rankings from Associated Press Poll released prior to the game
