= 1978 Bucknell Bison football team =

American college football season

1978 Bucknell Bison football
- Conference: Independent
- Record: 5–5
- Head coach: Bob Curtis (4th season)
- Captains: John Cieslewicz; Mike Cosimano; Brian Shaffer
- Home stadium: Memorial Stadium

1978 NCAA Division I-AA independents football standings
	Conf.			Overall
Team	W	L	T	W		L		T
No. 1 Nevada ^		–		11	–	1	–	0
No. 9 Lehigh		–		8	–	3	–	0
Northeastern		–		6	–	5	–	0
Bucknell		–		5	–	5	–	0
Northwestern State		–		5	–	6	–	0
Portland State		–		5	–	6	–	0
Lafayette		–		4	–	7	–	0
^ – NCAA Division I-AA playoff participant; Rankings from Associated Press poll

The 1978 Bucknell Bison football team was an American football team that represented Bucknell University as an independent during the 1978 NCAA Division I-AA football season.

Bucknell played its home games at Memorial Stadium on the university campus in Lewisburg, Pennsylvania.

== History ==
During its fourth year under head coach Bob Curtis, the Bison compiled a 5–5 record. John Cieslewicz, Mike Cosimano and Brian Shaffer were the team captains.

This was the first year of competition for Division I-AA, later to be renamed the Football Championship Subdivision. Bucknell, along with its in-state rivals Lafayette and Lehigh, moved up to I-AA after having previously competed as independents in NCAA Division II.

The Bison's 1978 schedule included opponents from Division I-A, Division I-AA, Division II and Division III.

== Schedule ==
Date	Opponent	Site	Result	Attendance	Source
September 16	at VMI	Alumni Memorial Field; Lexington, VA	L 14–25		
September 23	Rutgers^{†}	Memorial Stadium; Lewisburg, PA	L 13–27	9,500	
September 30	at Davidson	Richardson Stadium; Davidson, NC	W 21–20	4,600	
October 7	at Cornell	Schoellkopf Field; Ithaca, NY	L 0–24	12,500	
October 14	Lafayette^	Memorial Stadium; Lewisburg, PA	L 7–14		
October 21	at Gettysburg	Musselman Stadium; Gettysburg, PA	W 37–7	5,286	
October 28	at No. 3 Lehigh	Taylor Stadium; Bethlehem, PA	W 13–6	11,000	
November 4	Northeastern	Memorial Stadium; Lewisburg, PA	W 34–9		
November 11	Colgate	Memorial Stadium; Lewisburg, PA	W 7–0	2,500	
November 18	at Boston University	Nickerson Field; Boston, MA	L 10–27	3,178	
^{†}Homecoming; ^ Parents Weekend; Rankings from Associated Press Poll released prior to the game
