= Jimmy Jordan (quarterback) =

American football player (born 1958)

No. 15
- Position: Quarterback

Personal information
- Born: February 11, 1958 (age 68)

Career information
- College: Florida State
- NFL draft: 1980: 12th round, 320th overall pick

Career history
- New England Patriots (1980)*; Tampa Bay Bandits (1983–1985)
- * Offseason or practice squad member only

Career USFL statistics
- TD–INT: 18–26
- Passing yards: 2,583

Jimmy Jordan (born February 11, 1958) is an American former professional football quarterback in the United States Football League (USFL). He played for the Tampa Bay Bandits. He was selected by the New England Patriots in the 12th round of the 1980 NFL draft, but was released and never played in any games with the team. Jordan played college football at Florida State.

Jordan was inducted into Florida State's Hall of Fame in 1985.
