= 1978 Notre Dame Fighting Irish football team =

American college football season

1978 Notre Dame Fighting Irish football

Cotton Bowl champion

Cotton Bowl Classic, W 35–34 vs. Houston
- Conference: Independent

Ranking
- Coaches: No. 6
- AP: No. 7
- Record: 9–3
- Head coach: Dan Devine (4th season)
- Offensive coordinator: Merv Johnson (4th season)
- Offensive scheme: Pro set
- Base defense: 4-3
- MVP: Joe Montana
- Captains: Bob Golic; Jerome Heavens; Joe Montana
- Home stadium: Notre Dame Stadium

1978 NCAA Division I-A independents football records
	Conf.					Overall
Team	W		L		T	W		L		T
No. 4 Penn State		–		–		11	–	1	–	0
North Texas State		–		–		9	–	2	–	0
East Carolina		–		–		9	–	3	–	0
Navy		–		–		9	–	3	–	0
No. 7 Notre Dame		–		–		9	–	3	–	0
Rutgers		–		–		9	–	3	–	0
Florida State		–		–		8	–	3	–	0
Tennessee State		–		–		8	–	3	–	0
Temple		–		–		7	–	3	–	1
Pittsburgh		–		–		8	–	4	–	0
Holy Cross		–		–		7	–	4	–	0
Louisville		–		–		7	–	4	–	0
UNLV		–		–		7	–	4	–	0
Southern Miss		–		–		7	–	4	–	0
Northeast Louisiana		–		–		6	–	4	–	1
Georgia Tech		–		–		7	–	5	–	0
Hawaii		–		–		6	–	5	–	0
Miami (FL)		–		–		6	–	5	–	0
South Carolina		–		–		5	–	5	–	1
William & Mary		–		–		5	–	5	–	1
Cincinnati		–		–		5	–	6	–	0
Villanova		–		–		5	–	6	–	0
Army		–		–		4	–	6	–	1
Memphis State		–		–		4	–	7	–	0
Tulane		–		–		4	–	7	–	0
Virginia Tech		–		–		4	–	7	–	0
Air Force		–		–		3	–	8	–	0
Colgate		–		–		3	–	8	–	0
Richmond		–		–		3	–	8	–	0
Syracuse		–		–		3	–	8	–	0
Illinois State		–		–		2	–	9	–	0
West Virginia		–		–		2	–	9	–	0
Boston College		–		–		0	–	11	–	0
Rankings from AP Poll

The 1978 Notre Dame Fighting Irish football team was an American football team that represented the University of Notre Dame as an independent during the 1978 NCAA Division I-A football season. In their fourth year under head coach Dan Devine, the Irish compiled a 9–3 record, outscored opponents by a total of 258 to 163, and were ranked No. 7 in the final AP poll and No. 6 in the final UPI poll. Returning multiple starters from the 1977 national championship team, the Irish were ranked No. 5 in the preseason AP poll, but dropped out of the poll after losing the first two games to unranked Missouri and No. 5 Michigan. The Irish then won eight straight games and closed the season with a two-point loss to No. 3 USC and a victory over No. 9 Houston in the Cotton Bowl. In the Cotton Bowl, quarterback Joe Montana rallied the team from a 22-point deficit in the fourth quarter.

Center Dave Huffman and linebacker Bob Golic were consensus first-team picks on the 1978 All-America college football team. The team's statistical leaders included quarterback Joe Montana (2,010 passing yards), running backs Vagas Ferguson (1,192 rushing yards, 48 points scored) and Jerome Heavens (728 rushing yards), and wide receiver Kris Haines (32 receptions for 699 yards).

The team played its home games at Notre Dame Stadium in Notre Dame, Indiana.

== Schedule ==
Date	Time	Opponent	Rank	Site	TV	Result	Attendance	Source
September 9	1:30 p.m.	Missouri	No. 5	Notre Dame Stadium; Notre Dame, IN		L 0–3	59,075	
September 23	11:50 a.m.	No. 5 Michigan	No. 14	Notre Dame Stadium; Notre Dame, IN (rivalry)	ABC	L 14–28	59,075	
September 30	1:30 p.m.	Purdue		Notre Dame Stadium; Notre Dame, IN (rivalry)		W 10–6	59,075	
October 7	1:30 p.m.	at Michigan State		Spartan Stadium; East Lansing, MI (rivalry)		W 29–25	77,087	
October 14	12:40 p.m.	No. 9 Pittsburgh		Notre Dame Stadium; Notre Dame, IN (rivalry)	ABC	W 26–17	59,075	
October 21	2:30 p.m.	at Air Force	No. 20	Falcon Stadium; Colorado Springs, CO (rivalry)		W 38–15	35,425	
October 28	1:30 p.m.	Miami (FL)	No. 19	Notre Dame Stadium; Notre Dame, IN (rivalry)		W 20–0	59,075	
November 4	1:50 p.m.	vs. No. 11 Navy	No. 15	Cleveland Municipal Stadium; Cleveland, OH (rivalry)		W 27–7	63,780	
November 11	1:30 p.m.	Tennessee	No. 14	Notre Dame Stadium; Notre Dame, IN		W 31–14	59,075	
November 18	1:30 p.m.	at No. 20 Georgia Tech	No. 10	Grant Field; Atlanta, GA (rivalry)		W 38–21	54,526	
November 25	4:10 p.m.	at No. 3 USC	No. 8	Los Angeles Memorial Coliseum; Los Angeles, CA (rivalry)	ABC	L 25–27	84,256	
January 1, 1979	2:00 p.m.	vs. No. 9 Houston	No. 10	Cotton Bowl; Dallas, TX (Cotton Bowl)	CBS	W 35–34	32,500	
Rankings from AP Poll released prior to the game; All times are in Eastern time

== Game summaries ==
=== Michigan ===
Michigan Wolverines (1–0) at Notre Dame Fighting Irish (0–1)

Quarter	1	2	3	4	Total
#5 Michigan	0	7	7	14	28
Notre Dame	7	7	0	0	14

at Notre Dame Stadium, South Bend, Indiana

- Date: September 23
- Game time: 11:50 a.m. EST
- Game attendance: 59,075
- Referee: Gene Calhoun
- TV announcers (ABC): Chris Schenkel and Frank Broyles
- Recap

Game information

First quarter

- ND – Dennis Grindinger 6-yard pass from Joe Montana (Joe Unis kick), 14:07. Notre Dame 7–0. Drive:

Second quarter

- MICH – Rick Leach 4-yard run (Gregg Willner kick). Tie 7–7. Drive: 59 yards.
- ND – Vagas Ferguson 4-yard run (Joe Unis kick). Notre Dame 14–7. Drive:

Third quarter

- MICH – Doug Marsh 5-yard pass from Leach (Willner kick). Tie 14–14. Drive:

Fourth quarter

- MICH – Marsh 17-yard pass from Leach (kick failed). Michigan 20–14. Drive:
- MICH – Ralph Clayton 40-yard pass from Leach (run failed). Michigan 26–14. Drive:
- MICH – Safety, Montana tackled by Curtis Greer in end zone. Michigan 28–14.

Top passers

- MICH – Rick Leach – 8/20, 110 yards, 3 TD
- ND – Joe Montana – 16/29, 192 yards, TD, 2 INT

Top rushers

- MICH – Harlan Huckleby – 96 yards
- ND

Top receivers

- MICH
- ND

- The Reunion Game - first meeting between the two schools in 35 years
- Notre Dame wore green jerseys for the game

=== Pittsburgh ===
Team	1	2	3	4	Total
#9 Pittsburgh	0	10	0	7	17
• Notre Dame	7	0	0	19	26

- Date: October 14
- Location: Notre Dame Stadium, South Bend, Indiana
- Game start: 12:40 p.m. EDT
- Game attendance: 59,075
- Referee: Glenn Fortin (Big Ten)
- TV announcers (ABC): Keith Jackson and Frank Broyles

Scoring summary
1	ND	Heavens 1-yard run (Unis kick)	ND 7-0
2	PITT	Trocano 3-yard run (Schubert kick)	Tied 7-7
2	PITT	Schubert 33-yard field goal	PITT 10-7
4	PITT	Trocano 3-yard run (Schubert kick)	PITT 17-7
4	ND	Haines 8-yard pass from Montana (pass failed)	PITT 17-13
4	ND	Montana 1-yard run (kick failed)	ND 19-17
4	ND	Ferguson 3-yard pass from Montana (Unis kick)	ND 26-17

Notre Dame handed #9 Pittsburgh its first loss of the season. Jerome Heavens, who had never seen Knute Rockne, All American, surpassed George Gipp on the school's all-time rushing list. Heavens passed Gipp on his 24th carry but lost yardage on his 25th before moving past him for good on his 26th attempt. "I think the Gipper tackled me on that," Heavens said.

=== Cotton Bowl ===
The Cotton Bowl win over Houston on New Year's Day was Notre Dame's 600th victory.

== Roster ==
1978 Notre Dame Fighting Irish football team roster
Players
Coaches
Offense

Pos.	#	Name	Class
HB	2	Tyrone Barber	Fr
FB		Tony Belden
FL		Mike Boushka
FB	35	Pete Buchanan
C	65	Bob Burger	So
SE	80	Dave Condeni	Fr
FL	2	Mike Courey	So
C	53	Jeff Crippin	Jr
TE	81	Marty Detmer	So
RB		Steve Dover
HB	32	Vagas Ferguson	Jr
OT	73	Tim Foley	Jr
TE		Dennis Grindinger
SE	83	Kris Haines	Sr
TE	97	Kevin Hart	Jr
G		Jim Hautman
FB	30	Jerome Heavens (C)	Sr
FL	31	Pete Holohan	So
G		Ted Horansky (injured)
G		Larry Hufford
C	56	Dave Huffman	Sr
G	78	Tim Huffman	So
QB	13	Greg Knaflec	So
QB	14	Tim Koegel	So
G	69	John Leon	Jr
QB	6	Rusty Lisch	Jr
OT	75	Rob Martinovich	Jr
TE	86	Dean Masztak	Fr
OT		Keith McCormick
G		Howard Meyer
G		Ron Mishler
FB		Dave Mitchell
QB	3	Joe Montana (C)	Sr
E		Lou Pagley
RB	45	Pete Pallas	Sr
OT	71	Phil Pozderac	Fr
OT	57	John Scully	So
HB	42	Jim Stone	So
E	84	Tim Tripp	Fr
TE	95	Nick Vehr	So

Defense

Pos.	#	Name	Class
DT	94	Tom Bock	Fr
CB	24	Dick Boushka
S	33	Jim Browner	Sr
CB		Rick Buehner
DT	77	Mike Calhoun	Sr
DE	75	Jay Case	Sr
S	40	Steve Cichy	Fr
LB	43	Bob Crable	Fr
DB	20	Angelo Fasano	So
CB	25	Tom Flynn	Sr
CB	27	Tom Gibbons	So
LB	55	Bob Golic (C)	Sr
DE	92	Joe Gramke	Fr
DE	47	John Hankred	So
S	10	Randy Harrison
LB		Steve Hartwig
LB	58	Steve Heimkreiter	Sr
LB	51	Pete Johnson
SS	29	Phil Johnson	Sr
CB	19	John Krimm	Fr
LB	61	Bobby Leopold	Jr
DE	98	Pat Kramer	Fr
LB	59	Brendan Moynihan	So
DE		Hardy Rayam
S, P	7	Joe Restic	Sr
DT		John Thomas
CB	34	Dave Waymer	Jr
DT	74	Jeff Weston
OLB	54	Mike Whittington	Jr
DT	68	Tom Wroblewski	Jr
DE	70	Scott Zettek	Jr

Special teams

Pos.	#	Name	Class
PK	4	Chuck Male	Jr
PK	99	Joe Unis

Head coach

- Dan Devine

Coordinators/assistant coaches

- Brian Boulac
- Jim Gruden
- Jim Johnson
- Merv Johnson
- Ross Stephenson
- Ron Toman
- Joe Yonto

Legend

- (C) Team captain
- (S) Suspended
- (I) Ineligible
- Injured
- Redshirt

Roster
Last update: 2015-12-20
