= 1978 Cotton Bowl Classic =

- 42nd Cotton Bowl Classic
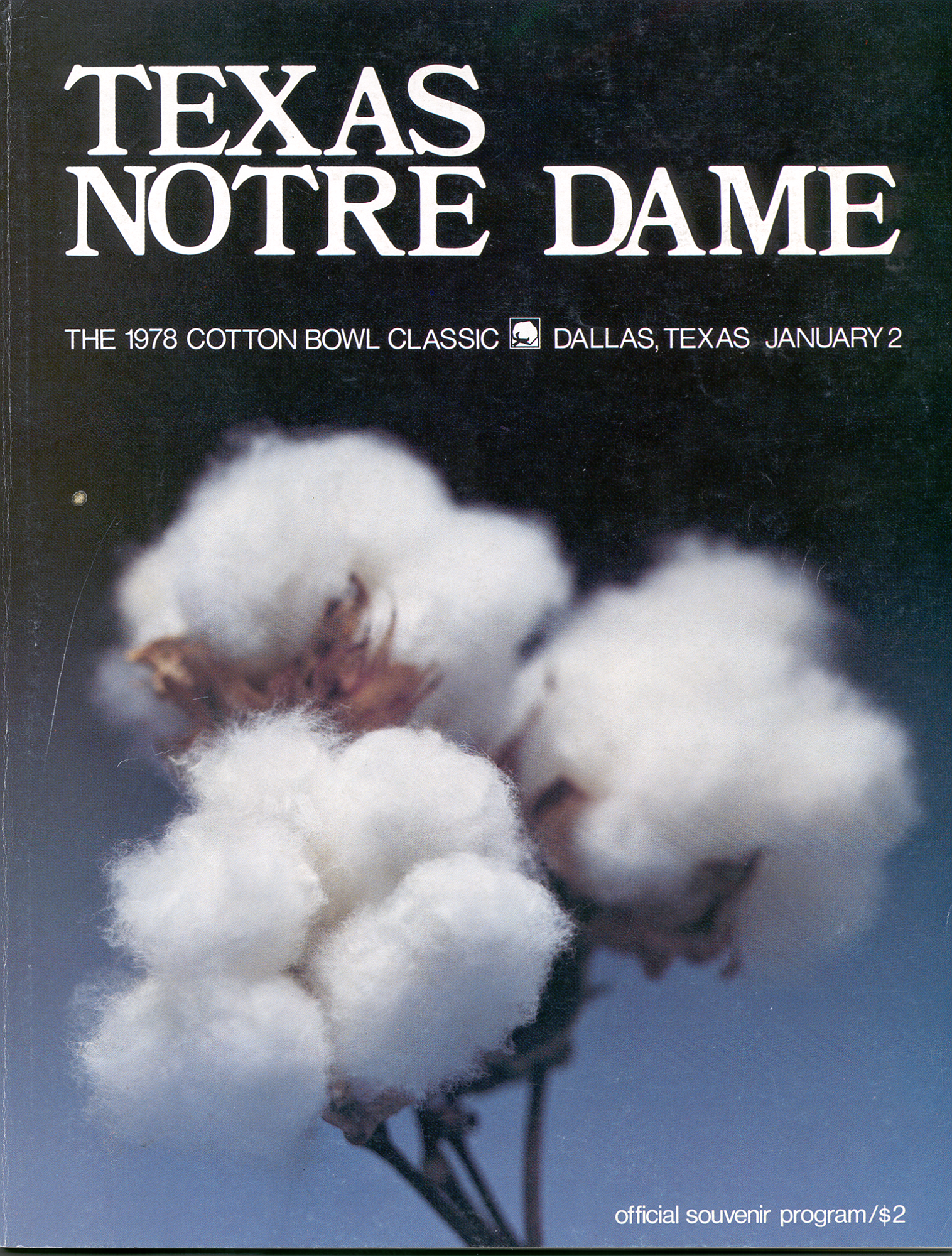
Notre Dame Fighting Irish	Texas Longhorns
(10–1)	(11–0)
Independent	SWC
38	10
Head coach: Dan Devine	Head coach: Fred Akers
AP / Coaches; 5 / 5	AP / Coaches; 1 / 1
	1	2	3	4	Total
Notre Dame	3	21	7	7	38
Texas	3	7	0	0	10
- Date: January 2, 1978
- Season: 1977
- Stadium: Cotton Bowl
- Location: Dallas, Texas
- MVP: Bob Golic (N. Dame LB); Vagas Ferguson (N. Dame RB)
- Favorite: Texas by 7 points
- Referee: Vance Carlson (Big Eight)
- Attendance: 76,701

United States TV coverage
- Network: CBS
- Announcers: Lindsey Nelson, Paul Hornung, Paul Alexander, and Don Criqui

The Cotton Bowl in Dallas, Texas, hosted the Cotton Bowl Classic.

The 1978 Cotton Bowl Classic was the 42nd edition of the college football bowl game, played at the Cotton Bowl in Dallas, Texas, on Monday, January 2. Part of the 1977–78 bowl game season, it matched the top-ranked and undefeated Texas Longhorns of the Southwest Conference (SWC) and the #5 Notre Dame Fighting Irish, an independent. A record crowd of 76,701 turned up to see the coronation of the Longhorns championship season, but Notre Dame surprisingly won as they dominated the Longhorns 38–10.

New Year's Day was on Sunday in 1978, and the major college bowl games were played the following day.

== Teams ==
=== Notre Dame ===
Fifth-ranked Notre Dame entered the game at 10–1. In September, they were upset by Mississippi in Jackson, but had won all nine games since.

=== Texas ===
Texas had won all eleven games; the closest margins were in October against Oklahoma and Arkansas.

== Game summary ==
Televised by CBS, the game kicked off at around 1 p.m. CST, as did the Sugar Bowl on ABC.

Heisman Trophy winner Earl Campbell of Texas gained 116 yards on 29 carries, but was kept out of the end zone. Tied at three after the first quarter, the Irish scored three touchdowns in eight minutes to lead 24–3; Texas finally got in the end zone late in the second quarter to narrow the lead to fourteen points at halftime. Notre Dame then shut out the Longhorns in the second half while scoring two more touchdowns.

The 28-point loss by the Longhorns resulted in complete chaos in the final polls, with Notre Dame vaulting past #3 Alabama to win the national championship.

=== Scoring ===
First quarter

- Notre Dame – Dave Reeve 47-yard field goal, 11:35 remaining (after fumble recovery by Ross Browner) ND 3–0
- Texas – Russell Erxleben 42-yard field goal, 6:07. Tie 3–3

Second quarter

- Notre Dame – Terry Eurick 6-yard run (Reeve kick), 14:56 (after fumble recovery by Jim Browner) ND 10–3
- Notre Dame – Eurick 10-yard run (Reeve kick), 11:37 (after fumble recovery by Willie Fry) ND 17–3
- Notre Dame – Vagas Ferguson 17-yard pass from Joe Montana (Reeve kick), 7:28 (after interception by Doug Becker) ND 24–3
- Texas – Mike Lockett 13-yard pass from Randy McEachern (Erxleben kick), 0:01 ND 24–10

Third quarter

- Notre Dame – Ferguson 3-yard run (Reeve kick), 6:49 (after interception by Steve Heimkreiter) ND 31–10

Fourth quarter

- Notre Dame – Ferguson 26-yard run (Reeve kick), 9:41 (after fake punt attempt) ND 38–10

== Statistics ==
Statistics	Notre Dame	Texas
First downs	26	16
Rushing yards	53–243	50–130
Passing yards	156	160
Passing	14–32–1	11–24–3
Total offense	85–399	74–290
Fumbles–lost	0–0	3–3
Turnovers	1	6
Punts–average	5–30.4	3–40.0
Penalties–yards	4–37	1–5

== Aftermath ==
Texas' loss opened the door to the national championship for several teams: second-ranked Oklahoma was soundly beaten 31–6 by #6 Arkansas in the Orange Bowl nightcap, and in between, fourth-ranked Michigan fell 27–20 to #13 Washington in the Rose Bowl. That left third-ranked Alabama and #5 Notre Dame as the primary teams for the title.

Alabama felt that with their convincing 35–6 win over #9 Ohio State in the Sugar Bowl, they would be champions due to the losses by Texas and Oklahoma, but the pollsters saw it differently. Notre Dame was voted number one in every poll. Perhaps the rout by fellow SWC member Arkansas in the Orange Bowl made the difference as it made Notre Dame's victory over Texas (who had won at Arkansas in mid-October) even more impressive.
