= 1979 Cotton Bowl Classic =

- 43rd Cotton Bowl Classic "The Chicken Soup Game"
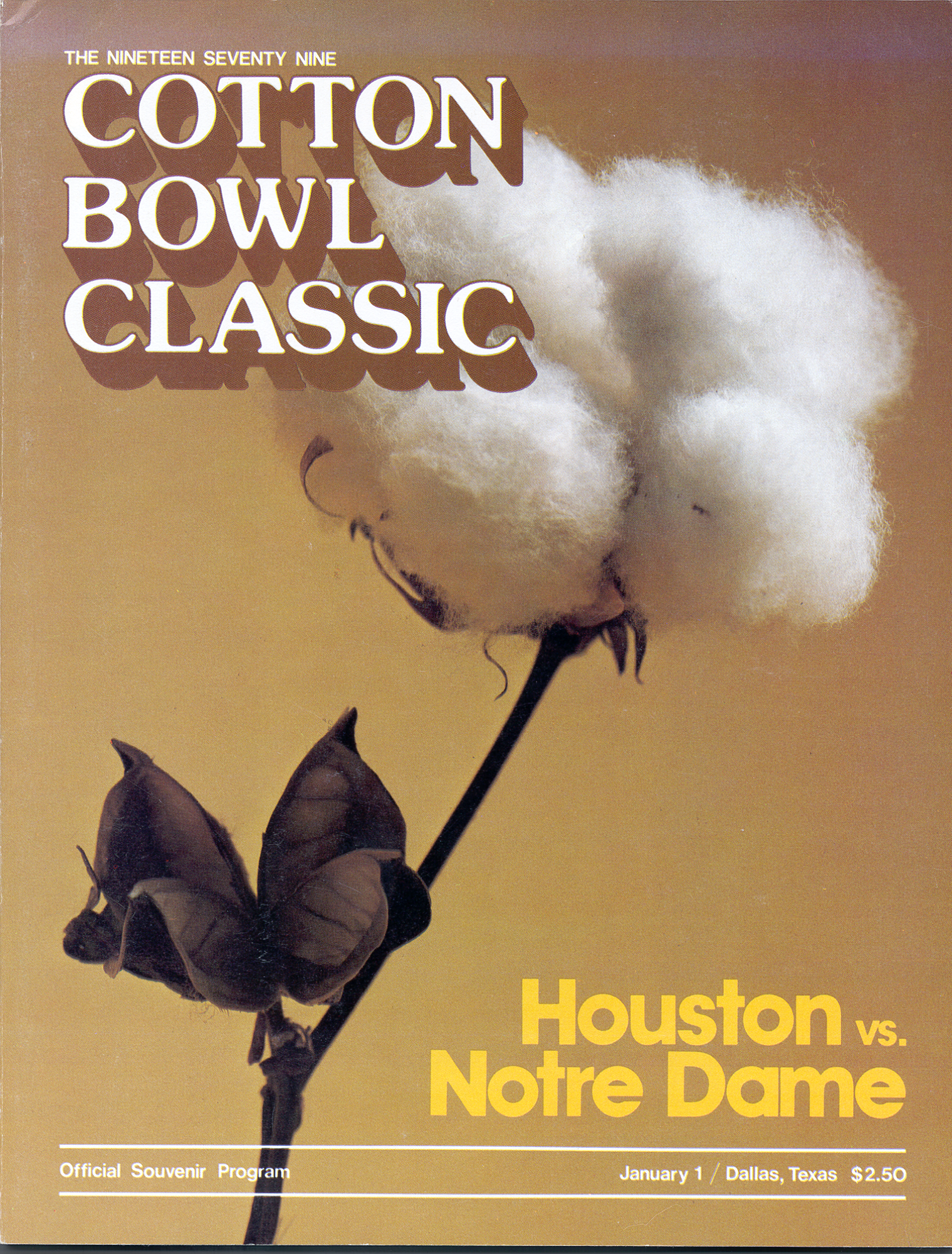
Notre Dame Fighting Irish	Houston Cougars
(8–3)	(9–2)
Independent	SWC
35	34
Head coach: Dan Devine	Head coach: Bill Yeoman
AP / Coaches; 10 / 9	AP / Coaches; 9 / 11
	1	2	3	4	Total
Notre Dame	12	0	0	23	35
Houston	7	13	14	0	34
- Date: January 1, 1979
- Season: 1978
- Stadium: Cotton Bowl
- Location: Dallas, Texas
- MVP: Joe Montana (Notre Dame QB); David Hodge (Houston LB)
- Favorite: Notre Dame by 3 points
- Referee: Pete Williams (SEC)
- Attendance: 72,000 (32,500 est. actual)

United States TV coverage
- Network: CBS
- Announcers: Lindsey Nelson, Paul Hornung, and Frank Glieber

The Cotton Bowl in Dallas, Texas, hosted the Cotton Bowl Classic.

The 1979 Cotton Bowl Classic was the 43rd edition of the college football bowl game, played at the Cotton Bowl in Dallas, Texas, on Monday, January 1. Part of the 1978–79 bowl game season, it matched the tenth-ranked Notre Dame Fighting Irish, an independent, and the #9 Houston Cougars of the Southwest Conference (SWC).

Popularly called the Chicken Soup Game, it took place on an unusually cold day, the day after the worst ice storm in Dallas in thirty years. Quarterback Joe Montana, who had the flu, rallied Notre Dame to victory in the second half after eating a bowl of chicken soup. The Irish outscored the Cougars 23–0 in the fourth quarter, scoring the game-tying touchdown and game-winning extra point with no time remaining.

== Pre-game information ==
Televised by CBS, the game kicked off shortly after 1 p.m. CST, as did the Sugar Bowl on ABC.

The seats at the Cotton Bowl were half empty despite the fact that the game was officially sold out. This was presumably caused by the "worst ice storm in 30 years," which had recently hit the Dallas area. "Some 50,000 homes were" allegedly "out of electricity the day before."

The game-time temperature was 22 °F (−5 °C) and an 18-mph wind caused a chill factor of −6 °F (−21 °C). The weather was expected to have an impact on the field conditions, as the "old artificial turf field," which was scheduled to be torn up after the season, was "icy at spots."

== Game summary ==
After Notre Dame took a 12–0 lead on two touchdowns in the first quarter, Houston scored 34 unanswered points to go up 34–12, ten minutes into the second half. At that point, Joe Montana, who had sat out the beginning of the half because of hypothermia, returned to the game and eventually led Notre Dame to a 35–34 win on two late touchdown drives, with the game-winning score occurring as time had expired.

=== First half ===
All the scoring in the first half occurred off turnovers. Both teams scored two touchdowns, which gave Houston a 14–12 lead after a missed extra point and an unsuccessful two-point try by Notre Dame.

In the first quarter, Notre Dame scored the first twelve points of the game, with its first score coming on a rushing touchdown by Joe Montana. After recovering a muffed punt deep in Notre Dame territory, Houston scored a touchdown on a 3rd-and-13 completion by Danny Davis to Willis Adams.

The Cougars added another touchdown on a fourth-and-goal play after recovering another Notre Dame fumble deep in Irish territory. Late in the first half, two interceptions by Montana led to two field goals for Houston. Aided by the direction of the wind, Houston had thus gained the lead in the second quarter and led 20–12 at halftime.

=== Second half ===
When the teams returned to the field to start the second half, Notre Dame quarterback Joe Montana remained in the locker room. During the game, Montana's body temperature had dipped to 96 °F (35.6 °C) and he had to fight off hypothermia. He was forced to retire to the locker room where the Notre Dame medical staff, led by orthopedic surgeon Les Bodnar, warmed Montana by feeding him chicken bouillon soup, originally intended for offensive lineman Tim Foley, and covering him with warm blankets.

In the third quarter, Houston built a 34–12 lead on two touchdowns coming on option running plays by quarterback Danny Davis. Montana returned to the field after missing just over ten minutes of game time and was cheered actively by the Notre Dame fans. He led Notre Dame to its initial first down of the second half but threw interceptions on his first two drives of the half for a total of four in the game.

Playing with the wind in the fourth quarter, however, Notre Dame cut the Houston lead to six points. Having blocked a Houston punt on the Cougars' previous drive, the Irish repeated that feat, with Steve Cichy running the ball in for a touchdown. On Notre Dame's next offensive possession, Montana threw a 30-yard completion to Jerome Heavens and scored a rushing touchdown. Having converted a two-point attempt after both of these touchdowns, Notre Dame had closed the gap to six points to make the score 34–28 Houston.

With a half minute left and fourth down and one on their own 29, Houston went for the first down and was stopped. With six seconds left on the eight-yard-line, Montana threw the ball out of bounds and only two seconds remained.

The final play was a touchdown pass to receiver Kris Haines as time expired. Placekicker Joe Unis was forced to kick the extra point twice after a Notre Dame penalty but was successful both times, and Notre Dame won by a point, 35–34.

With a high temperature of 24 °F (−4 °C), a strong 30 mph (50 km/h) north wind affected both the subzero wind chill and the outcome of the game; all but seven of the game's 69 combined points were scored by the team defending the north end zone. Because of the weather, the stadium was less than half full in the first half and as few as 7,000 remained at game's end.

=== Scoring ===
First quarter

- Notre Dame – Joe Montana 3-yard run (kick failed)
- Notre Dame – Pete Buchanan 1-yard run (pass failed)
- Houston – Willis Adams 15-yard pass from Danny Davis (Kenny Hatfield kick)

Second quarter

- Houston – Randy Love 1-yard run (Hatfield kick)
- Houston – Hatfield 21-yard field goal
- Houston – Hatfield 24-yard field goal

Third quarter

- Houston – Davis 2-yard run (Hatfield kick)
- Houston – Davis 5-yard run (Hatfield kick)

Fourth quarter

- Notre Dame – Steve Cichy 33-yard blocked punt return (Vagas Ferguson pass from Montana)
- Notre Dame – Montana 2-yard run (Kris Haines pass from Montana)
- Notre Dame – Haines 8-yard pass from Montana (Joe Unis kick)

== Statistics ==
Statistics	Notre Dame	Houston
First downs	13	16
Rushing yards	40–131	63–229
Passing yards	163	60
Passing	13–37–4	4–13–0
Total offense	77–294	73–289
Fumbles–lost	3–3	6–3
Turnovers	7	3
Punts–average	7–26	10–25
Penalties–yards	8–74	6–39

== Aftermath ==
The game is one of the most notable games in Montana's entire football career. It was his final game for Notre Dame and helped to reinforce his image with football fans as "The Comeback Kid." Six months after the game, Notre Dame put out a promotional film called Seven and a Half Minutes to Destiny. Notre Dame head coach Dan Devine called the movie a "Joe Montana film."

The Cougars returned the following year and staged a dramatic win of their own, defeating Nebraska 17–14 in the final seconds.

Montana went on to a hall of fame career in the National Football League (NFL), winning four Super Bowls with the San Francisco 49ers.
