= 1977 Notre Dame Fighting Irish football team =

American college football season

1977 Notre Dame Fighting Irish football

Consensus national champion Cotton Bowl Classic champion

Cotton Bowl Classic, W 38–10 vs. Texas
- Conference: Independent

Ranking
- Coaches: No. 1
- AP: No. 1
- Record: 11–1
- Head coach: Dan Devine (3rd season)
- Offensive coordinator: Merv Johnson (3rd season)
- Offensive scheme: Pro set
- Defensive coordinator: Joe Yonto
- Base defense: 4–3
- MVP: Joe Montana
- Captains: Terry Eurick; Willie Fry; Steve Orsini
- Home stadium: Notre Dame Stadium

1977 NCAA Division I independents football records
	Conf.					Overall
Team	W		L		T	W		L		T
No. 1 Notre Dame		–		–		11	–	1	–	0
No. 5 Penn State		–		–		11	–	1	–	0
Colgate		–		–		10	–	1	–	0
North Texas State *		–		–		10	–	1	–	0
No. 16 San Diego State		–		–		10	–	1	–	0
Tennessee State		–		–		8	–	1	–	1
No. 14 Florida State		–		–		10	–	2	–	0
No. 8 Pittsburgh		–		–		9	–	2	–	1
East Carolina		–		–		8	–	3	–	0
Rutgers		–		–		8	–	3	–	0
Army		–		–		7	–	4	–	0
Louisville		–		–		7	–	4	–	1
Boston College		–		–		6	–	5	–	0
Cincinnati		–		–		5	–	4	–	2
Georgia Tech		–		–		6	–	5	–	0
Memphis State		–		–		6	–	5	–	0
Northwestern State		–		–		6	–	5	–	0
Syracuse		–		–		6	–	5	–	0
William & Mary		–		–		6	–	5	–	0
Southern Miss		–		–		6	–	5	–	0
Temple		–		–		5	–	5	–	1
Hawaii		–		–		5	–	6	–	0
Navy		–		–		5	–	6	–	0
West Virginia		–		–		5	–	6	–	0
South Carolina		–		–		5	–	7	–	0
Utah State		–		–		4	–	7	–	0
Villanova		–		–		4	–	7	–	0
Illinois State		–		–		3	–	7	–	1
Virginia Tech		–		–		3	–	7	–	1
Miami (FL)		–		–		3	–	8	–	0
Richmond		–		–		3	–	8	–	0
Tulane		–		–		3	–	8	–	0
Air Force		–		–		2	–	8	–	1
Holy Cross		–		–		2	–	8	–	0
Northeast Louisiana		–		–		2	–	9	–	0
North Texas State (originally 9–2) awarded a forfeit win after Mississippi State was found to be using an ineligible player.; Rankings from AP Poll

The 1977 Notre Dame Fighting Irish football team represented the University of Notre Dame during the 1977 NCAA Division I football season. The Irish, coached by Dan Devine, ended the season with 11 wins and one loss, winning the national championship. The Fighting Irish won the title by defeating the previously unbeaten and No. 1 ranked Texas Longhorns in the Cotton Bowl Classic by a score of a 38–10. The 1977 squad became the tenth Irish team to win the national title and were led by All-Americans Ken MacAfee, Ross Browner, Luther Bradley, and Bob Golic. Junior Joe Montana, a future Pro Football Hall of Famer, was the team's starting quarterback.

Dan Devine entered his third year as head coach, coming off of a 9–3 season in 1976 that culminated in a Gator Bowl win over Penn State. Devine returned a highly touted defense, featuring 1976 Outland Trophy winner Ross Browner, defensive end Willie Fry, and All-American linebacker Bob Golic. On offense, quarterback Joe Montana earned the starting job and led an offense that included running backs Jerome Heavens and Vagas Ferguson and All-American tight end Ken MacAfee. Montana, earned a reputation as "the comeback kid", had two come from behind victories in the fourth quarter, against Purdue and Clemson, down 17 and 10 respectively. After a surprising loss to unranked Ole Miss, patience among the fans was running thin, who considered Devine's previous 8–3 and 9–3 seasons as lackluster compared to the team success under Devine's predecessor, Ara Parseghian. The Irish rebounded to win their remaining games, including a 49–19 rout of USC in the now famous "Green Jersey Game." The Irish earned a berth in the Cotton Bowl Classic, where they defeated No. 1 and unbeaten Texas by a score of 38–10 to capture Notre Dame's tenth national title. The Irish leaped four spots in the polls after the Cotton Bowl Classic victory to claim the consensus title.

== Schedule ==
Date	Time	Opponent	Rank	Site	TV	Result	Attendance	Source
September 10	3:50 p.m.	at No. 7 Pittsburgh	No. 3	Pitt Stadium; Pittsburgh, PA (rivalry)	ABC	W 19–9	56,500	
September 17	2:30 p.m.	vs. Ole Miss	No. 3	Mississippi Veterans Memorial Stadium; Jackson, MS		L 13–20	48,200	
September 24	2:30 p.m.	at Purdue	No. 11	Ross–Ade Stadium; West Lafayette, IN (rivalry)		W 31–24	68,966	
October 1	2:30 p.m.	Michigan State	No. 14	Notre Dame Stadium; Notre Dame, IN (rivalry)		W 16–6	59,075	
October 15	1:30 p.m.	vs. Army	No. 11	Giants Stadium; East Rutherford, NJ (rivalry)		W 24–0	72,594	
October 22	1:50 p.m.	No. 5 USC	No. 11	Notre Dame Stadium; Notre Dame, IN (rivalry)	ABC	W 49–19	59,075	
October 29	2:30 p.m.	Navy	No. 5	Notre Dame Stadium; Notre Dame, IN (rivalry)		W 43–10	59,075	
November 5	1:30 p.m.	Georgia Tech	No. 5	Notre Dame Stadium; Notre Dame, IN (rivalry)		W 69–14	59,075	
November 12	1:30 p.m.	at No. 15 Clemson	No. 5	Memorial Stadium; Clemson, SC		W 21–17	53,467–54,189	
November 19	1:30 p.m.	Air Force	No. 6	Notre Dame Stadium; Notre Dame, IN (rivalry)		W 49–0	59,075	
December 3	8:00 p.m.	at Miami (FL)	No. 5	Miami Orange Bowl; Miami, FL (rivalry)		W 48–10	35,789	
January 2, 1978	2:00 p.m.	vs. No. 1 Texas	No. 5	Cotton Bowl; Dallas, TX (Cotton Bowl Classic)	CBS	W 38–10	76,701	
Rankings from AP Poll released prior to the game; All times are in Eastern time

== Game summaries ==
=== Pittsburgh ===
Notre Dame Fighting Irish (0–0) at Pittsburgh Panthers (0–0)

Quarter	1	2	3	4	Total
Notre Dame	0	6	0	13	19
Pittsburgh	7	2	0	0	9

at Pitt Stadium, Pittsburgh, Pennsylvania

- Date: September 10, 1977
- Game attendance: 56,500
- Referee: Paul Bertha
- TV announcers (ABC): Keith Jackson and Ara Parseghian
- Recap

Game information

First quarter

- PITT – Gordon Jones 12-yard pass from Matt Cavanaugh (Mark Schubert kick). Pitt 7–0. Drive:

Second quarter

- PITT – Safety, Joe Restic tackled in end zone. Pitt 9–0.
- ND – Ken MacAfee 5-yard pass from Rusty Lisch (kick blocked). Pitt 9–6. Drive:

Fourth quarter

- ND – Dave Reeve 35-yard field goal. Tie 9–9. Drive:
- ND – Dave Reeve 26-yard field goal. Notre Dame 12–9. Drive:
- ND - Terry Eurick 4-yard run (Dave Reeve kick). Notre Dame 19–9. Drive:

Top rushers

- ND – Jerome Heavens – 88 yards

=== Ole Miss ===
Notre Dame Fighting Irish (1–0) at Ole Miss Rebels

Quarter	1	2	3	4	Total
Notre Dame	0	7	0	6	13
Ole Miss	3	7	0	10	20

at Mississippi Veterans Memorial Stadium, Jackson, Mississippi

- Date: September 17, 1977
- Game weather: Sunny, 90 °F (32 °C)
- Game attendance: 48,200
- Recap

Game information

First quarter

- MISS – Carl Langley 29-yard field goal. Ole Miss 3–0. Drive: 64 yards.

Second quarter

- ND – Jerome Heavens 2-yard run (Dave Reeve kick). Notre Dame 7–3. Drive: 8 plays.
- MISS – James Storey 10-yard pass from Bobby Garner (Carl Langley kick). Ole Miss 10–7. Drive: 6 plays, 75 yards.

Fourth quarter

- ND – Dave Reeve 44-yard field goal. Tie 10–10. Drive: 5 plays
- ND – Dave Reeve 28-yard field goal, 4:53. Notre Dame 13–10. Drive:
- MISS – James Storey 10-yard pass from Tim Ellis (Carl Langley kick), 3:13. Ole Miss 17–13. Drive: 5 plays, 80 yards.
- MISS – Carl Langley 27-yard field goal, 1:44. Ole Miss 20–13. Drive:

Top passers

- ND – Rusty Lisch – 11/25, 127 yards, 2 INT

Top rushers

- ND – Jerome Heavens – 16 rushes, 70 yards, TD

Top receivers

- ND – Ken MacAfee – 6 receptions, 69 yards

Ole Miss gave the eventual national champion Notre Dame its only loss of the season.

=== Purdue ===
Team	1	2	3	4	Total
• Notre Dame	0	14	0	17	31
Purdue	10	14	0	0	24

- Date: September 24
- Location: Ross–Ade Stadium, West Lafayette, IN
- Game attendance: 68,966

Scoring summary
1		PUR	Scott Sovereen 25-yard field goal	PUR 3-0
1		PUR	Reggie Arnold 8-yard pass from Mark Herrmann (Scott Sovereen kick)	PUR 10-0
2		ND	Terry Eurick 6-yard pass from Rusty Lisch (Dave Reeve kick)	PUR 10-7
2		ND	Terry Eurick 18-yard pass from Rusty Lisch (Dave Reeve kick)	ND 14-10
2		PUR	Raymond Smith 37-yard pass from Mark Herrmann (Scott Sovereen kick)	PUR 17-14
2		PUR	Russell Pope 43-yard pass from Mark Herrmann (Scott Sovereen kick)	PUR 24-14
4		ND	Dave Reeve 24-yard field goal	PUR 24-17
4		ND	Ken MacAfee 13-yard pass from Joe Montana (Dave Reeve kick)	Tied 24-24
4	1:39	ND	Dave Mitchell 4-yard run (Dave Reeve kick)	ND 31-24

=== Michigan State ===
Michigan St at #14 Notre Dame

Team	1	2	3	4	Total
Michigan St	3	0	3	0	6
• Notre Dame	0	10	6	0	16

- Date: October 1
- Location: Notre Dame Stadium, South Bend, IN

Scoring summary
1	MSU	Nielsen 38-yard field goal	MSU 3-0
2	ND	Reeve 42-yard field goal	Tied 3-3
2	ND	Mitchell 9-yard run (Reeve kick)	ND 10-3
3	ND	Reeve 40-yard field goal	ND 13-3
3	ND	Reeve 51-yard field goal	ND 16-3
4	MSU	Nielsen 37-yard field goal	ND 16-6

=== Army ===
Team	1	2	3	4	Total
Army	0	0	0	0	0
• Notre Dame	0	7	10	7	24

- Date: October 15
- Location: Giants Stadium
- Game attendance: 72,594

Scoring summary
Q2	ND	Heavens 3 yard run (Reeve kick)	ND 7–0
Q2	ND	Reeve 29 yard field goal	ND 10–0
Q3	ND	Eurick 2 yard run (Reeve kick)	ND 17–0
Q4	ND	Eurick 3 yard run (Reeve kick)	ND 24–0

- ND: Jerome Heavens 34 Rush, 200 Yds (single game school record - Sitko 1948 vs. Michigan St)

=== USC ===
Team	1	2	3	4	Total
USC	0	7	0	12	19
• Notre Dame	7	15	13	14	49

- Date: October 22
- Location: Notre Dame Stadium, South Bend, IN
- Game attendance: 59,075
- Referee: Glenn Fortin (Big Ten)
- TV announcers (ABC): Keith Jackson, Frank Broyles

Scoring summary
1	ND	Dave Mitchell 4-yard run (Dave Reeve kick)	ND 7-0
2	USC	Mario Celotto 5-yard fumble return (Frank Jordan kick)	Tied 7-7
2	ND	Joe Montana 1-yard run (Ted Burgmeier to Tom Domin pass)	ND 15-7
2	ND	Ken MacAfee 13-yard pass from Joe Montana (Dave Reeve kick)	ND 22-7
3	ND	Jay Case 30-yard blocked punt return (Dave Reeve kick)	ND 29-7
3	ND	Ken MacAfee 1-yard pass from Joe Montana (kick failed)	ND 35-7
4	ND	Joe Montana 1-yard run (Dave Reeve kick)	ND 42-7
4	USC	Calvin Sweeney 14-yard pass from Rob Hertel (Frank Jordan kick)	ND 42-14
4	ND	Kevin Hart 4-yard pass from Rusty Lisch (Dave Reeve kick)	ND 49-14

Notre Dame wore green jerseys for the first time since their 1963 game against Syracuse.

=== Navy ===
Team	1	2	3	4	Total
Navy	0	0	3	7	10
• Notre Dame	7	9	14	13	43

- Date: October 29
- Location: Notre Dame Stadium • South Bend, Indiana
- Game attendance: 59,075

Scoring summary
1	ND	Heavens 49-yard run (Reeve kick)	Notre Dame 7-0
2	ND	Reeve 34-yard field goal	Notre Dame 10-0
2	ND	Reeve 24-yard field goal	Notre Dame 13-0
2	ND	Reeve 32-yard field goal	Notre Dame 16-0
3	ND	Montana 1-yard run (Reeve kick)	Notre Dame 23-0
3	NAVY	Tata 46-yard field goal	Notre Dame 23-3
3	ND	Mitchell 7-yard pass from Montana (Reeve kick)	Notre Dame 30-3
4	ND	Stone 58-yard run (kick failed)	Notre Dame 36-3
4	NAVY	McConkey 7-yard pass from Powers (Tata kick)	Notre Dame 36-10
4	ND	Leopold 50-yard pass interception return (Unis kick)	Notre Dame 43-10

Notre Dame wore green jerseys for the second straight week.

=== Georgia Tech ===
Team	1	2	3	4	Total
Georgia Tech	0	7	0	7	14
• Notre Dame	0	21	21	27	69

- Date: November 5
- Location: Notre Dame Stadium • South Bend, Indiana
- Game start: 1:30 pm EST
- Game attendance: 59,075

Scoring summary
2	ND	Montana 1-yard run (kick failed)	Notre Dame 6-0
2	GT	Ivery 97-yard kickoff return (Smith kick)	Ga. Tech 7-6
2	ND	Eurick 8-yard pass from Montana (Montana run)	Notre Dame 14-7
2	ND	Haines 18-yard pass from Montana (Reeve kick)	Notre Dame 21-7
3	ND	Waymer 68-yard pass from Montana (Reeve kick)	Notre Dame 28-7
3	ND	Heavens 2-yard run (Reeve kick)	Notre Dame 35-7
3	ND	Ferguson 1-yard run (Reeve kick)	Notre Dame 42-7
4	ND	Ferguson 56-yard run (Reeve kick)	Notre Dame 49-7
4	ND	Stone 14-yard pass from Lisch (kick failed)	Notre Dame 55-7
4	ND	Stone 21-yard run (Unis kick)	Notre Dame 62-7
4	ND	S. Hart 31-yard pass from Koegel (Unis kick)	Notre Dame 69-7
4	GT	D. Hill 18-yard pass from Hardie (Smith kick)	Notre Dame 69-14

Notre Dame wore green jerseys for the third straight week, and for every home game through the end of the 1980 season. The 69 points were the second most ever scored at Notre Dame Stadium.

=== Clemson ===
Team	1	2	3	4	Total
• Notre Dame	7	0	0	14	21
Clemson	0	10	7	0	17

- Date: November 12
- Location: Memorial Stadium • Clemson, SC
- Game start: 1:30 pm EST
- Game attendance: 54,189

Scoring summary
1	ND	Heavens 5-yard run (Reeve kick)	Notre Dame 7-0
2	Clem	Ariri 30-yard field goal	Notre Dame 7-3
2	Clem	Fuller 10-yard run (Ariri kick)	Clemson 10-7
3	Clem	Brown 1-yard run (Ariri kick)	Clemson 17-7
4	ND	Montana 2-yard run (Reeve kick)	Clemson 17-14
4	ND	Montana 1-yard run (Reeve kick)	Notre Dame 21-17

This was the first-ever meeting between Notre Dame and Clemson.

=== Air Force ===
Team	1	2	3	4	Total
Air Force	0	0	0	0	0
• Notre Dame	21	14	7	7	49

- Date: November 19
- Location: Notre Dame Stadium • South Bend, Indiana
- Game start: 1:30 pm EST
- Game attendance: 59,075
- Game weather: cloudy, 40 degrees

Scoring summary
1	ND	Ferguson 56-yard run (Reeve kick)	Notre Dame 7-0
1	ND	Ferguson 9-yard run (Reeve kick)	Notre Dame 14-0
1	ND	Heavens 1-yard run (Reeve kick)	Notre Dame 21-0
2	ND	Ferguson 2-yard run (Reeve kick)	Notre Dame 28-0
2	ND	Haines 33-yard pass from Montana (Reeve kick)	Notre Dame 35-0
3	ND	Eurick 2-yard run (Reeve kick)	Notre Dame 42-0
4	ND	Schmitz 11-yard pass from Lisch (Reeve kick)	Notre Dame 49-0

This was the final game for Air Force head coach Ben Martin after 20 seasons. It also remains the most lopsided game in the 30-game series between Notre Dame and Air Force (the Fighting Irish lead 24–6).

=== Miami (FL) ===
Team	1	2	3	4	Total
• Notre Dame	14	6	21	7	48
Miami (FL)	0	10	0	0	10

- Date: December 3
- Location: Miami Orange Bowl
- Game attendance: 35,789

Scoring summary
Q1	ND	Ferguson 11 yard run (Reeve kick)	ND 7–0
Q1	ND	Leopold 17 yard interception return (Reeve kick)	ND 14–0
Q2	MIA	Dennis 38 yard field goal	ND 14–3
Q2	MIA	Alvers 35 yard pass from McMillian (Dennis kick)	ND 14–10
Q2	ND	Ferguson 23 yard pass from Montana (kick failed)	ND 20–10
Q3	ND	MacAfee 4 yard pass from Montana (Reeve kick)	ND 27–10
Q3	ND	Mitchell 3 yard run (Reeve kick)	ND 34–10
Q3	ND	MacAfee 5 yard pass from Montana (Reeve kick)	ND 41–10
Q4	ND	Lisch 1 yard run (Reeve kick)	ND 48–10

=== Texas (Cotton Bowl) ===
Team	1	2	3	4	Total
• Notre Dame	3	21	7	7	38
Texas	3	7	0	0	10

- Location: Cotton Bowl
- Game attendance: 76,701
- Game weather: Sunny; 35 °F (2 °C)

Scoring summary
Q1	11:35	ND	Reeve 47 yard field goal	ND 3–0
Q1	6:07	TEX	Erxleben 42 yard field goal	Tie 3–3
Q2	14:56	ND	Eurick 6 yard run (Reeve kick)	ND 10–3
Q2	11:37	ND	Eurick 10 yard run (Reeve kick)	ND 17–3
Q2	7:28	ND	Ferguson 17 yard pass from Montana (Reeve kick)	ND 24–3
Q2	0:00	TEX	Lockett 13 yard pass from McEachern (Erxeleben kick)	ND 24–10
Q3	6:49	ND	Ferguson 3 yard run (Reeve kick)	ND 31–10
Q4	9:41	ND	Ferguson 26 yard run (Reeve kick)	ND 38–10

== Roster ==
1977 Notre Dame Fighting Irish football team roster
Players
Coaches
Offense

Pos.	#	Name	Class
TE	87	Mark Czaja	So
WR	1	Ty Dickerson	Fr
RB	26	Tom Domin
RB	5	Steve Dover
QB	8	Gary Forystek
RB	40	Terry Eurick (C)
RB	32	Vagas Ferguson	So
OT	73	Tim Foley	So
WR	82	Kris Haines	Jr
TE	97	Kevin Hart
WR	85	Speedy Hart	Jr
C	63	Jim Hautman
RB	30	Jerome Heavens	Jr
G	66	Ted Horansky
C	56	Dave Huffman	Jr
OT	78	Tim Huffman	Fr
G	65	Ernie Hughes	Sr
QB	1	Greg Knafelc	Fr
RB	21	Dan Knott	Sr
QB	14	Tim Koegel	Fr
G	69	John Leon
QB	6	Rusty Lisch	So
TE	81	Ken MacAfee	Sr
OT	75	Rob Martinovich	So
OT	71	Steve McDaniels	Sr
G	60	Howard Meyer	Jr
RB	44	Dave Mitchell
QB	3	Joe Montana	Jr
C	50	Terry Murphy
RB	14	Steve Orsini (C)
RB	45	Pete Pallas	Jr
RB	19	Steve Schmitz	Sr
RB	42	Jim Stone
OT	67	Bob Tull	Sr
G	59	Dave Vinson
RB	34	Dave Waymer	So

Defense

Pos.	#	Name	Class
LB	43	Doug Becker	Sr
CB	24	Dick Boushka
CB	20	Luther Bradley	Sr
SS	33	Jim Browner	Jr
DE	89	Ross Browner	Sr
CB	18	Ted Burgmeier
DT	77	Mike Calhoun	Jr
DT	75	Jay Case	Jr
SS	28	Ross Christensen	Sr
CB	16	Nick DeCicco
DT	79	Ken Dike	Sr
CB	23	Tom Flynn	Jr
DE	94	Willie Fry (C)
FS	27	Tom Gibbons	Fr
LB	55	Bob Golic	Jr
LB	47	John Hankerd
FS	10	Randy Harrison	Jr
LB	58	Steve Heimkreiter	Jr
SS, QB	31	Pete Holohan	Fr
LB	51	Pete Johnson
SS	29	Phil Johnson	Jr
LB	61	Bobby Leopold	So
CB	9	Jim Morse
DE	72	Hardy Rayam
FS	7	Joe Restic	Jr
DE	88	Tom VanDenburgh	So
DT	74	Jeff Weston	Jr
LB	54	Mike Whittington	So
DT	68	Tom Wroblewski	So
DE	70	Scott Zettek	So

Special teams

Pos.	#	Name	Class
P	4	Kevin Muno	So
K	13	Dave Reeve	Sr
P	7	Joe Restic	Jr
K	99	Joe Unis

Head coach

- Dan Devine

Coordinators/assistant coaches

Legend

- (C) Team captain
- (S) Suspended
- (I) Ineligible
- Injured
- Redshirt

== Award winners ==
- Ross Browner, Lombardi Award, Maxwell Award
- Ken MacAfee, Walter Camp Award

Heisman Trophy voting

Ken MacAfee, 3rd
Ross Browner, 5th

All-Americans
Name	AP	UPI	NEA	FC	SN	FW	FN	WCF	CW
† Ross Browner, DE	1	1	1	1	1	1	1	1	1
† Ken MacAfee, TE	1	1	1	1	1	1	1	1	1
‡ Luther Bradley, DB	2	1	2	1			1	1	
Ernie Hughes, G	2	2							
Bob Golic, MG (MLB)	2	2				2			
Willie Fry, DE		2							
Ted Burgmeier, DB						2			
†denotes unanimous selection ‡denotes consensus selection

College Football Hall of Fame inductees
Name	Position	Year Inducted
Ross Browner	Defensive end	1999
Dan Devine	Coach	1985
Ken MacAfee	Tight end	1997

== 1978 NFL draft ==
Player	Position	Round	Pick	Franchise
Ken MacAfee	Tight end	1(7)	7	San Francisco 49ers
Ross Browner	Defensive end	1(8)	8	Cincinnati Bengals
Luther Bradley	Defensive back	1(11)	11	Detroit Lions
Willie Fry	Defensive end	2(23)	49	Pittsburgh Steelers
Ernie Hughes	Guard	3(23)	79	San Francisco 49ers
Ted Burgmeier	Defensive back	5(1)	111	Miami Dolphins
Steve McDaniels	Tackle	9(27)	249	San Francisco 49ers
Doug Becker	Linebacker	10(18)	268	Pittsburgh Steelers
