= Notre Dame–USC football rivalry =

American college football rivalry

- Notre Dame Fighting Irish USC Trojans
- First meeting: December 4, 1926; Los Angeles Memorial Coliseum; Notre Dame, 13–12
- Latest meeting: October 18, 2025; Notre Dame Stadium; Notre Dame, 34–24
- Next meeting: August 31, 2030; Los Angeles Memorial Coliseum
- Trophy: Jeweled Shillelagh (1952–present); None (1926–1951)

Statistics
- Total meetings: 96
- All-time series: Notre Dame leads, 51–37–5 (.575) (Note: On the field, including vacated wins, Notre Dame leads 53–38–5)
- Trophy series: Notre Dame leads, 36–30–3 (.543)
- Largest victory: Notre Dame, 51–0 (1966)
- Longest win streak: Notre Dame, 11 (1983–1993)
- Longest unbeaten streak: Notre Dame, 13 (1983–1995)
- Current win streak: Notre Dame, 3 (2023–present)

Locations of USC and Notre Dame

The Notre Dame–USC football rivalry is an American college football rivalry between the Notre Dame Fighting Irish football team of the University of Notre Dame and USC Trojans football team of the University of Southern California, customarily played on the Saturday following Thanksgiving Day when the game is in Los Angeles and on the second or third Saturday of October when the game is in Notre Dame, Indiana. The series is scheduled to resume in the 2030 season through the 2033 season.

The rivalry began in 1926 and is considered one of the fiercest in college football. The game has been played every year from 1926 to the present with the exception of 1943 to 1945 when the game was cancelled during World War II and in 2020 when the Pac-12 Conference cancelled all non-conference games in response to the COVID-19 pandemic. The pandemic therefore interrupted a streak of 73 consecutive years in which the game had been played. The 2021 matchup marked the first time in series history that two consecutive games between the rivals were played in Indiana, although the games were not played in consecutive years.

Notre Dame and USC have been among the most successful programs in college football, with the schools having won a combined 22 national championships and 15 Heisman Trophies (8 for USC—the most in college football—and 7 for Notre Dame) through the 2023 season. Moreover, both schools have fielded a significant number of Consensus All-Americans (102 for Notre Dame—the most in college football—and 82 for USC), College Football Hall of Famers (46 from Notre Dame and 43 from USC) and Pro Football Hall of Famers (13 from each). The rivals account for the highest numbers of players selected in the NFL draft of any school; Notre Dame has had 546 players taken, and USC has had 530. No other rivalry in college football accounts for as many combined honors.

The teams play for the Jeweled Shillelagh, a trophy that goes to the winning team each year. As of 2025, Notre Dame leads the all-time series 51–37–5 and also leads 36–30–3 since the introduction of the trophy. Despite many close games, the series has had dominant runs by both sides: USC went 12–2–2 from 1967 through 1982, Notre Dame went 11–0–1 from 1983 through 1995, and USC went 8–0 from 2002 through 2009. From 2010 to 2025, Notre Dame has gone 11-4 on the field, although 2 Irish wins in 2012 and 2013 against USC and USC's 2005 win over Notre Dame were vacated for NCAA rules violations. However, while Notre Dame and USC have played in landmark games enabling one of them to move on to a national title, the two teams have also played spoiler to each other several times.

A No. 1 undefeated Notre Dame beat No. 2 undefeated USC in the Coliseum en route to the national title in 1988. The Irish also spoiled Trojan title campaigns by handing them their first loss in the last game of the season in 1947 and 1952, as well as beating them in 1927, 1973 and 1995. The Irish also tied No. 1 ranked USC in 1968 21–21, knocking them down to No. 2 behind Ohio State, who then beat USC in a No. 1 vs. No. 2 matchup in the Rose Bowl). The Irish tied the Trojans again in 1969 14–14, the only blemish in USC's 10–0–1 season.

USC spoiled Irish title hopes in 1938, 1964, 1970, 1980 and tied them in 1948 after Michigan already had been voted No. 1 by the AP Poll. Each game came in the final week of the season. USC also spoiled Irish campaigns in 1931 and 1971.

Although the game is played in Los Angeles in even numbered years, it was not part of Fox's Pac-12 Conference football package. Currently the games played in Los Angeles fall under the TV contract of the Big Ten Conference and could air on CBS, NBC, FS1, Peacock or BTN. Although Fox Sports holds primary TV rights to the Big Ten Conference, it does not have the opportunity to air this game since Fox has chosen to air the Michigan-Ohio State rivalry game usually played on the same date instead. In odd-numbered years when the game is played in Indiana, it is broadcast on NBC as part of its coverage of Notre Dame's home schedule.

== Series history ==
=== Origins ===
==== Conversation between wives ====
The origin of the series is often referred to as a "conversation between wives" of Notre Dame head coach Knute Rockne and USC athletic director Gwynn Wilson. The rivalry began with USC looking for a nationally prominent opponent. USC dispatched Wilson and his wife to Lincoln, Nebraska, where Notre Dame was playing the Nebraska Cornhuskers on Thanksgiving Day. Following Notre Dame's 17–0 loss, Knute Rockne resisted the idea of a home-and-home series with USC because of the travel involved, but Mrs. Wilson was able to persuade Mrs. Rockne that a trip every two years to Southern California was better than one to snowy, hostile Nebraska. Mrs. Rockne spoke to her husband and on December 4, 1926, USC became an annual fixture on Notre Dame's schedule.

==== Another tale ====
While the "wives story" remains the classic explanation for starting the series, college football historian Murray Sperber in his book Shake Down the Thunder on the early days of Notre Dame football uncovered a different explanation for the creation of the series that somewhat contradicts that story. Sperber documents that the series was created primarily for financial and political reasons and that Rockne's resistance to the series is misstated. During the 1920s, many college institutions, including the Big Ten (then called the Western Conference), sought to combat the commercialism that was steadily increasing in college athletics. Part of the concern over commercialism stemmed from the large money payouts teams would receive by traveling long distances to play in bowl games.

Meanwhile, Notre Dame had difficulty scheduling local Western Conference opponents because of a ban placed on member schools from playing them. The Irish were initially forced to seek out opponents nationally to fill its schedule, often traveling far away to do so. After the Irish started winning landmark games against elite programs such as Georgia Tech and Army, the team started to grow in popularity and could command more money for games it scheduled. Notre Dame attracted interest from the Rose Bowl Committee to come and play a Pacific Coast Conference opponent for the 1924 football season. Coach Rockne and the Notre Dame administration realized how lucrative an annual trip to Los Angeles would be for the football program. Notre Dame's West Coast alumni began lobbying Rockne to bring the team to the Rose Bowl as a season finale every year. The Rose Bowl Committee favored this arrangement, and at the time there was no tie in with the Big Ten; however, the Pacific Coast Conference had reservations. Specifically, two members schools, Stanford and California refused to play Notre Dame "on account of Notre Dame's low [sic] scholastic standards." Since Notre Dame was a Catholic university, its academics were considered by some as inferior at the time. USC's coach Gus Henderson reached out to Rockne through correspondence stating that "USC would welcome the chance to play Notre Dame New Year's Day in Pasadena." While Rockne favored playing USC, Stanford (which won the Pacific Coast Conference title that year) had first choice and eventually realized that playing Notre Dame would be lucrative, and the two played in the 1925 Rose Bowl.

The series between Notre Dame and USC was created because of the still-existing desire for Notre Dame to travel to Los Angeles to please its alumni, earn a large payout, and create an opportunity as well to recruit West Coast high school players. While the creation of the series was contradictory to Notre Dame's efforts to follow the Big Ten in combating commercialism (the Big Ten had had a 26-year Bowl ban, which Notre Dame followed even longer), Rockne and other administrators justified the game since it was created as a home-and-home series, only to be played in Los Angeles every other year. The creation of the series was also influenced by the USC hiring of Howard Jones, who knew Rockne from coaching against him at Iowa. To the Notre Dame administration, playing USC in Los Angeles every other year was preferable to making further trips to the Rose Bowl game. Notre Dame would not agree to play in another bowl game until the 1970 Cotton Bowl.

==== Knute Rockne–Howard Jones connection ====
Another factor in the creation of the series is the connection between both schools' coaches, Knute Rockne and Howard Jones. Following Notre Dame's 1924 championship season, Rockne was approached by USC to take over its football program. Rockne would often entertain such advances and let the news slip out to the Notre Dame administration in order to get a raise and bolster his position internally and nationally. While Rockne ultimately turned down the offer, he recommended that USC look at his friend Jones. Barry LeBrock, author of The Trojan Ten, also confirms that Rockne lent the Trojans a helping hand in recommending that they consider hiring Jones after firing "Gloomy Gus" Henderson. The creation of the series was likely also influenced by Jones' desire to take USC to Notre Dame's elite level.

=== 1920s ===
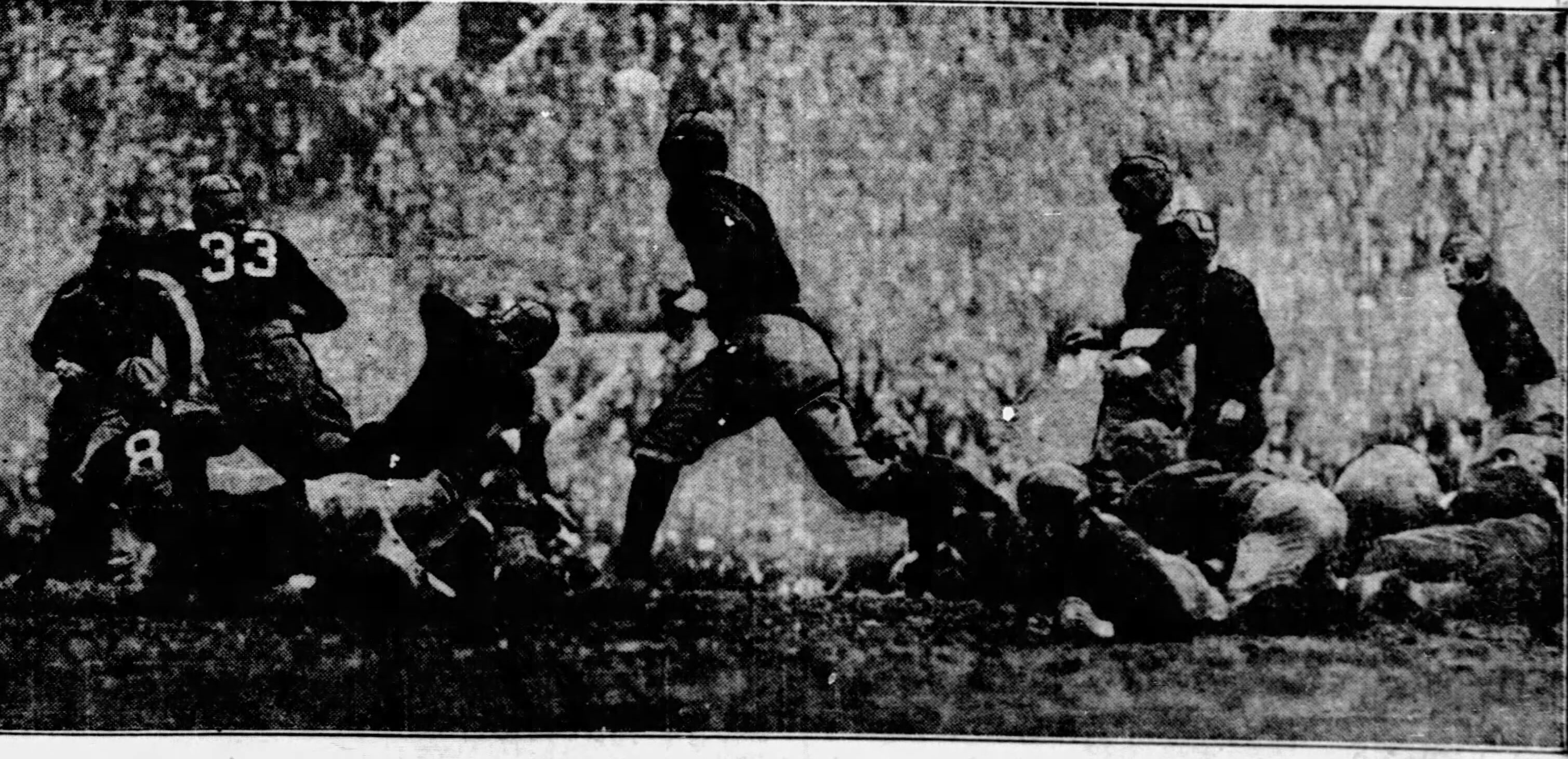
Christie Flanagan with ball during the 1927 USC–Notre Dame game

Notre Dame and USC played their first game in 1926, a 13–12 win for the Irish. Rockne was quoted as saying it was the greatest game he ever saw. The following year, Notre Dame and USC would play a memorable game at Soldier Field in Chicago, a slim 7–6 Irish victory. An estimated 120,000 people were in attendance, a crowd that is one of the largest attended games in NCAA history. USC's first win in the series also came during the same year that they won their first national title in 1928. From 1928 to 1932, USC and Notre Dame combined to win the national title five straight years, with USC winning in 1928, 1931, and 1932, and Notre Dame winning in 1929 and 1930. During this period, there was some talk of canceling the series due to the long travel time it took by train from Indiana to Los Angeles. Rockne argued for the series against the Notre Dame faculty board and its chair the Rev. Michael Mulcaire, countering that "he saw the day coming when most college teams will be going by air exclusively."

In 1929, Notre Dame defeated USC 13 to 12. This game played at Soldier Field has one of largest verified attendances in the history of NCAA football at 112,912. As of 2008, it still ranked the second-highest verified attendance.

=== 1930s ===
In 1930, Notre Dame won its second consecutive national championship and third overall and 19th straight game in what turned out to be the last regular season game under coach Knute Rockne.

1931 – USC 16, Notre Dame 14
More than 300,000 fans welcomed the Trojans home from this thrilling victory in South Bend — a victory clinched by what sportswriter Maxwell Stiles called "Johnny Baker's 10 little toes and three BIG points." After trailing 14–0, USC won the game with a Johnny Baker 33-yard field goal with one minute remaining. The win snapped Notre Dame's 26-game unbeaten string and was the Trojans' first win in South Bend. Called "the biggest upset since Mrs. O'Leary's cow knocked over that lantern" by El Rodeo, USC's student yearbook, it clinched USC's second national title. Sports historians cite this come-from-behind victory with Jones as coach that prompted the school from the West to catapult into the same elite circle with ND.

1932 – USC 13, Notre Dame 0
USC shut out Notre Dame on its way to a second consecutive consensus national title, matching Notre Dame's feat in 1929 and 1930.

1938 – USC 13, Notre Dame 0
Notre Dame entered the game ranked No. 1 in the scheduled final AP Poll, released in late November prior to the game. Following their loss, the AP poll was extended for one week due to the "select quality of last Saturday's games, three of which had a direct bearing on the ranking." USC's win dropped the Irish to No. 5 and out of AP national championship consideration.

=== 1940s ===
The 1940s were good for the Irish, which earned national titles in 1943, 1946, 1947, and 1949. Meanwhile, USC was fielding competitive teams but none that achieved national championship status. Still, this era provided some memorable games, with USC playing spoiler to the Irish in 1948.

1947 – Notre Dame 38, USC 7
104,953 were on hand, the highest attendance for a football game in the Coliseum, to see 7–0–1 Rose Bowl-bound USC lose to 8–0 Notre Dame 38–7. Notre Dame was awarded the AP National Championship. USC would lose to Michigan 49–0 in the Rose Bowl, leading Michigan also to claim a national championship.

1948 – USC 14, Notre Dame 14
The Irish were undefeated and untied riding a 21-game winning streak before this game on December 2.

=== 1950s ===
1950 – USC 9, Notre Dame 7
USC's 300th victory in a dismal 4–4–1 season for the Irish, their worst under coach Frank Leahy.

1954 – Notre Dame 23, USC 17
Notre Dame quarterback Ralph Guglielmi threw a 72-yard pass to Jim Morse with 5:52 remaining for the win.

1959 – Notre Dame 16, USC 6
This was the last game played between the two teams in Indiana in November. Athletic director Jess Hill proposed moving USC's games at Notre Dame Stadium to mid-October while continuing to play the Coliseum games in late November, to which Notre Dame agreed.

=== 1960s ===
The 1960s–1982 period is considered by most fans to be the golden age of the rivalry, as Notre Dame and USC combined to win eight national titles. Notre Dame won national titles in the 1966, 1973, and 1977 seasons; USC won titles in 1962, 1967, 1972, 1974, and 1978. USC also played spoiler to Notre Dame in the 1964 season, costing them a chance at the national title. The rivalry was equally intense between USC coach John McKay and Notre Dame coach Ara Parseghian.

1960 – Notre Dame 17, USC 0
Notre Dame was 1–8 coming into this game, having lost eight straight games, a school record that still stands. The Trojans, under rookie coach John McKay, finished 4–6.

1961 – Notre Dame 30, USC 0
The Irish improved to 3–0 for the season in notching their fifth straight win against the Trojans in dominating fashion in the first meeting between the two rivals played in October. USC ended up with zero net rushing yards as their quarterbacks were sacked repeatedly. It was the largest margin of victory for a Joe Kuharich-coached Notre Dame team and in the process, Kuharich became the only Irish coach to date to post back-to-back shutouts over USC.

1962 – USC 25, Notre Dame 0
USC was undefeated and ranked #1 in the nation while Notre Dame was 5–4, having won four straight. The Trojans would be voted national champions after this game and would go on to outlast Wisconsin in a wild Rose Bowl victory, while Irish coach Joe Kuharich would resign the following spring.

1963 – Notre Dame 17, USC 14
Ken Ivan's fourth-quarter field goal proved to be the difference as the Irish avoided an 0–3 start by knocking off the defending national champions. Notre Dame won only one more game all season long, a 27–12 victory over UCLA the following week, and finished a dismal 2–7 under interim head coach Hugh Devore.

1964 – USC 20, Notre Dame 17
Notre Dame was ranked #1, undefeated and an 11-point favorite going into the game at USC's Los Angeles Memorial Coliseum. Ara Parseghian, Notre Dame's first-year head coach, was in the midst of a major Irish turnaround at 9–0 after ND had gone 2–7 the previous year. USC was unranked and was 6–3 on the season. Star quarterback and eventual Heisman winner John Huarte directed the Irish to a 17–0 lead at halftime. That lead would evaporate, however, as the Trojans took a 20–17 lead on a fourth-down pass from Trojan quarterback Craig Fertig to wide receiver Rod Sherman with 1:35 remaining. A game-changing call came on USC's last touchdown drive when Fertig was hit and fumbled the ball backwards. Despite an apparent recovery by the Irish, the officials ruled that this was an incomplete pass, despite it being thrown in the direction of no eligible receiver. Notre Dame put together a last-minute drive, and with six seconds left, Huarte threw a pass to receiver Jack Snow that was broken up in the end zone. Notre Dame's hopes of a national title evaporated, though the Trojans' bid for the Rose Bowl berth also fell short despite the upset. Notre Dame fell to a number 3 ranking the following week's polls but was still awarded the MacArthur Bowl as the nation's #1 team at year's end.

1965 – Notre Dame 28, USC 7
USC came into this game undefeated while the Irish were 3–1. Heisman Trophy winner Mike Garrett was held to 43 yards rushing as the Irish avenged their 20–17 loss the previous season. Fullback Larry Conjar scored all four Irish touchdowns and rushed for 116 yards. It was Ara Parseghian's only win against the Trojans to not come during a national title year for the Irish.

1966 – Notre Dame 51, USC 0
Following its controversial 10–10 tie with Michigan State, Notre Dame routed the Trojans 51–0, earning Notre Dame the number one ranking. Backup quarterback Coley O'Brien, who came off the bench the previous week after Terry Hanratty was injured, made the most of his only collegiate start, completing 21 of 31 passes for 255 yards and three touchdowns. Tom Schoen and Dave Martin each returned interceptions for touchdowns. The game still stands as the worst defeat in Trojan history and until 2009 it was one of only two times the Trojans had given up 50 points in a game. McKay allegedly vowed never to lose to Notre Dame again after that game, although he denied ever making such a statement. However, McKay did say that the Trojans would never lose again by a score of 51–0.

1967 – USC 24, Notre Dame 7
Coming off the previous year's loss, the Trojans came into the game ranked number 1 in the polls, although Notre Dame was still a heavy favorite. The win marked USC's first win in Indiana since 1939 behind the running of tailback O. J. Simpson, the junior college transfer from San Francisco. Simpson rushed for 160 yards on 38 carries and scored all three USC touchdowns after Notre Dame led at halftime, 7–0. The victory solidified USC's place at the top of the final rankings.

1968 – Notre Dame 21, USC 21
USC came into the game undefeated and ranked number 1 in the nation behind the running of eventual Heisman Trophy winner O. J. Simpson, while the Irish were 7–2. The game was one of the most widely viewed in college football history with a 22.9 rating, surpassing even the 1966 Notre Dame match-up with Michigan State. Joe Theismann started at quarterback in place of the injured Terry Hanratty, and on the second play of the game, he threw an interception that Sandy Durko returned for a touchdown and a quick 7–0 lead for the Trojans. However, Theismann was unfazed and by halftime had staked the Irish to a 21–7 lead, the third touchdown coming on a halfback-to-quarterback option pass by Coley O'Brien. The Trojans scored twice in the second half to tie the score and after two unsuccessful field goal attempts by Notre Dame, the game ended in a tie. Simpson was held to 55 net rushing yards, his lowest output of the season. The Irish finished with a fifth-place ranking with a 7–2–1 record, while the Trojans would lose to the eventual national champion Ohio State in the Rose Bowl. It marked the last season of self-imposed bowl abstinence for Notre Dame.

1969 – USC 14, Notre Dame 14
For the second straight year, the Irish and the Trojans tied. Notre Dame came into the game at 3–1, having lost to Purdue and their quarterback Mike Phipps while USC was undefeated. After a scoreless first half, the Trojans took a 14–7 lead in the fourth quarter. Notre Dame tied the game after blocking a USC punt deep in Trojan territory. As was the case a year earlier, the Irish missed a field goal late in the game that would have put them ahead. USC would finish their season 10–0–1 with a Rose Bowl win over Michigan while Notre Dame would end its self-imposed refusal to go to bowl games and make its first bowl appearance in 45 years, losing to eventual national champion Texas in the Cotton Bown in a 21–17 thriller.

=== 1970s ===
1970 – USC 38, Notre Dame 28
Notre Dame was 9–0 and ranked #2 behind Texas, whom they would face in a rematch in the Cotton Bowl Classic, while USC was 5–4–1. Heisman Trophy runner-up Joe Theismann set a still-standing single game school record with 526 passing yards in a losing effort. The game was played in a torrential downpour, and two fumbles, one in their own end zone, proved costly for the Irish as the Trojans extended their lead to 38–14. Notre Dame came back to within ten early in the fourth quarter but would not get any closer. They would go on to end Texas's 30-game winning streak with a 24–11 victory in the Cotton Bowl.

1972 – USC 45, Notre Dame 23
USC was 10–0 and ranked #1 while the Irish were 8–1 and Orange Bowl-bound. Trojan tailback Anthony Davis scored six touchdowns including two kickoff returns that went the distance. The Trojans went on to rout Ohio State in the Rose Bowl and to claim the national championship while Notre Dame would suffer its worst defeat under coach Ara Parseghian against Nebraska in the Orange Bowl, 40–6.

1973 – Notre Dame 23, USC 14
Notre Dame was 5–0. while the Trojans were 5–0–1. Trojan tailback Anthony Davis managed only 55 yards rushing in the contest. Eric Penick's 85-yard touchdown run early in the third quarter was the key play of the game. Notre Dame's defense set the tone on the first play of the game when Trojan quarterback Pat Haden attempted a swing pass to Lynn Swann, who was hit so hard by freshman Luther Bradley that his helmet flew off. Bradley's interception late in the game sealed the victory, only the third for Ara Parseghian against the Trojans. The Irish would proceed to run the table and stake their claim to the national championship after a thrilling 24–23 win over Alabama in the Sugar Bowl.

1974 – USC 55, Notre Dame 24 "The Comeback"
In a notable comeback, the 1974 Trojans erased a 24-point deficit to beat defending national champion Notre Dame 55–24 in the Coliseum. Some football historians cite this as one of USC's 10 greatest games. The Irish had jumped out to a 24–0 lead, but with 10 seconds remaining before halftime, Anthony Davis scored on a 7-yard pass from Pat Haden. At the start of second half, Davis took the opening kickoff and raced 102 yards for a score, opening the floodgates as USC rallied for 35 points in the third quarter. Davis scored 2 more touchdowns that quarter, and Haden threw two TD passes to J. K. McKay, the head coach's son. In the fourth quarter, Haden connected with Shelton Diggs for a touchdown and Charles Phillips returned an interception 58 yards for a touchdown. USC scored 55 points in under 17 minutes. A few weeks later, Ara Parseghian announced his resignation, and the Irish gave him a fitting farewell present with an emotional 13–11 win over Alabama and Bear Bryant in the Orange Bowl.

1975 – USC 24, Notre Dame 17
Notre Dame came into this game at 5–1, having lost only to Michigan State, while USC was 6–0 and ranked third in the country. Joe Montana made his first start at quarterback for Notre Dame after engineering two fourth-quarter comeback victories in as many weeks against North Carolina and Air Force. Al Hunter's 52-yard touchdown run gave the Irish an early lead. Notre Dame missed the extra point, and the lead stayed at 6–0. After USC subsequently took a 7–6 lead, Notre Dame blocked a punt and returned it for an apparent touchdown, but the play was nullified by a penalty. Undaunted, the Irish blocked the punt a second time and also returned it for a touchdown. The play stood, and after a successful two-point conversion, the Irish were back in front, 14–7. They took a 17–14 lead into the fourth quarter, but USC would score ten unanswered points to put the game away. Following the win, Trojan coach John McKay announced he would jump to the NFL expansion Tampa Bay Buccaneers the following season. The Trojans would lose their last four regular season games en route to an 8–4 campaign while the Irish would finish 8–3.

1977 – Notre Dame 49, USC 19 "The Green Jersey Game"
Dan Devine entered his third year as the Irish head coach while coach John Robinson was in his second year at USC following the departure of John McKay to the NFL. Notre Dame sat at 4–1, with an upset loss coming to unranked Ole Miss in the second game of the season. Patience was running thin with Irish fans, who considered Devine's consecutive 8–3 and 9–3 seasons as lackluster compared to what they were accustomed to with coach Ara Parseghian. Devine needed a win against the 5–1 Trojans, whose only blemish was a 1-point loss to Alabama. However, Devine had something special in mind for the game. During pregame warmups, the Irish players wore their traditional navy blue jerseys. Following their warmups, they went into the locker room and found co-captains Terry Eurick and Willie Fry clad in emerald green jerseys. A similar green jersey sat in each player's locker. The players quickly returned to the field, followed by a Trojan Horse containing students dressed as Notre Dame players but wearing blue jerseys, being dragged by students wearing togas. The sight of the team wearing green sent the crowd at Notre Dame Stadium into a frenzy that would carry on through the entire game. Quarterback Joe Montana led the Irish offense to a quick 7–0 lead, but the USC linebacker Mario Celloto tied the score on a five-yard fumble return. After several missed field goals, Montana led the offense on a quarterback sneak and directed the Irish to 28 unanswered points, including two touchdown passes to All-American tight end Ken MacAfee. Senior defensive back Ted Burgmeier intercepted a Rob Hertel pass, executed a fake field goal to perfection, and turned a botched snap on a point after touchdown into a successful two-point conversion when he lofted a pass to halfback Tom Domin. USC could not score until the 4th quarter, and Notre Dame went on to win the game and wore the green jerseys all the way to a victory over Texas in the Cotton Bowl Classic and captured the National Championship.

1978 – USC 27, Notre Dame 25
Notre Dame came into the game with an 8–2 record, having won eight straight after dropping their first two games and were headed to the Cotton Bowl Classic. For three quarters, USC moved the ball at will and was overwhelming the Irish. Trailing 24–6, Irish quarterback Joe Montana led a fourth quarter comeback, and Notre Dame took a 25–24 lead with 45 seconds remaining. Notre Dame attempted a two point comversion after the touchdown but was stopped. In the ensuing series, Notre Dame recovered an apparent fumble by Trojan quarterback Paul McDonald, but the play was ruled an incomplete pass. Given new life, the Trojans moved into field goal range, and with four seconds left, Frank Jordan scored the game winner for a 27–25 win. Montana would lead his team to victory one last time in the 1979 Cotton Bowl Classic.

1979 – USC 42, Notre Dame 23
Notre Dame was 4–1 while USC came into this game at 5–0–1. Both teams would accumulate over 500 yards of total offense as the Trojans pulled away in the second half after being tied 7–7 after 30 minutes. Heisman Trophy winner Charles White accounted for 261 rushing yards on 44 carries.

=== 1980s – Notre Dame's "Decade of Dominance" ===
1980 – USC 20, Notre Dame 3
Notre Dame entered this game at 9–0–1 and headed for a matchup against Georgia in the Sugar Bowl and a shot at a national championship. They came out flat and sputtered offensively all afternoon. Trojan tailback Marcus Allen did not play because of an eye injury. This was the final regular season game for Irish coach Dan Devine, who announced in August that he would be leaving Notre Dame at season's end. Notre Dame would subsequently lose to Georgia in the Sugar Bowl and finish 9–2–1.

1982 – USC 17, Notre Dame 13
The Trojans won in the closing seconds in what was Trojan coach John Robinson's last game in his first stint with the team; he had stated that he wanted his players to "win one for the fat guy." Concluding one drive, Trojan Michael Harper appeared to have fumbled the ball before crossing the goal line, and despite the fact that Notre Dame recovered the ball, the touchdown stood. Notre Dame finished 6–4–1 for the season, losing their last three games, while the Trojans wound up 8–3.

From 1983 to 1993, Notre Dame entered an unprecedented run of success in the series, beating USC 11 straight times. Including a 1994 tie, USC did not beat Notre Dame until 1996, going 13 years without a win. Despite the one-sided nature of the series during this time period, the rivalry still produced several memorable games, including the series' first and only #1 vs #2 matchup to date.

1983 – Notre Dame 27, USC 6
Notre Dame began an undefeated streak against USC which did not end until 1996. Coach Gerry Faust pulled out all the stops in an effort to halt a five-game slide for the Irish in the series. As in the 1977 "green jersey" game when Coach Dan Devine had the Irish warm up in traditional blue, then come out of the tunnel in Irish Green jerseys, Faust did the same in this game.

1985 – Notre Dame 37, USC 3
Notre Dame head coach Gerry Faust had his team switch to green jerseys during halftime with the Irish leading, 24–0.

1986 – Notre Dame 38, USC 37
Trailing 37–20 in the fourth quarter, the Irish rallied to win the game on John Carney's 19-yard field goal as time expired in Lou Holtz's first season as head coach. USC appeared to have a first down on a 4th and 1 play deep in Notre Dame territory while leading 37–27, but the officials did not award forward progress and then flagged USC quarterback Rodney Peete for unsportsmanlike conduct when he threw his arms up in disgust at where the ball was marked. The victory was not enough to prevent a losing season, as Notre Dame finished 5–6. It was also a breakout game for future Heisman Trophy winner Tim Brown.

1987 – Notre Dame 26, USC 15
Notre Dame entered this game at 4–1 while USC was 4–2. After the Trojans scored a quick touchdown on their first possession, the Irish unleashed an overpowering running attack that would net 351 rushing yards. USC would not score again until the closing seconds.

1988 – Notre Dame 27, USC 10 – #1 vs #2
For the first time in this storied series, both teams entered the game undefeated and ranked number one and two respectively. In a controversial move, coach Lou Holtz took his 10–0 Irish squad to L.A. without stars Ricky Watters and Tony Brooks, whom he suspended for disciplinary reasons. The USC Trojans were also undefeated under head coach Larry Smith and standout quarterback Rodney Peete. The Irish came into the game as underdogs, but the play of defensive end Frank Stams and cornerback Stan Smagala aided the Irish offense led by Tony Rice in capturing another Irish victory. Notre Dame went on to capture the National Championship that year, beating West Virginia in the Fiesta Bowl. The sellout crowd of 93,829 was the largest in this rivalry since 1955.

1989 – Notre Dame 28, USC 24
Notre Dame was ranked #1 with an 18-game winning streak. The game was marred by a brawl in the tunnel before the start of the contest. The game itself was a thriller. USC quarterback Todd Marinovich completed 33 of 55 passes and staked the Trojans to a 17–7 halftime lead, but the Irish fought back in the second half with Tony Rice scoring the winning TD on a keeper, and Notre Dame's defense held off one last Trojan drive.

=== 1990s ===
1995 – Notre Dame 38, USC 10
USC came into the October game undefeated and ranked #5, while Notre Dame was ranked #17. Riding a six-game win streak with dominating wins over #25 Arizona and conference opponent Arizona State, USC was enjoying its best start to a football season since 1988. The Irish defense held USC to 10 points, including a forced fumble on the goal line by Irish linebacker Kinnon Tatum. USC lost the game but would finish at 9–2–1 with a Rose Bowl title, while Notre Dame finished 9–3. It would be Holtz's last victory against USC.

For a six-year period, USC and Notre Dame went .500 against each other, with Southern California winning the first three games and Notre Dame winning the last three. The 2001 Notre Dame victory was also their last until their 2010 defeat of the Trojans.

1996 – USC 27, Notre Dame 20
After 11 straight years of losses and 13 straight years without beating Notre Dame, the Trojans defeated the Irish. USC was struggling at 5–6 after a double-overtime loss to UCLA the previous week, while Notre Dame had an 8–2 record. and a New Year's Day bowl bid still possible. The Trojans managed to stay in the game despite playing without starting quarterback Brad Otton for most of the contest due to injury. Notre Dame scored a touchdown to go ahead 20–12 with the PAT pending in the fourth quarter, but Irish kicker Jim Sanson missed the extra point and the margin stayed at eight. The Trojans responded with an eight-play 67-yard drive culminating in Delon Washington's 15-yard touchdown run with 1:50 remaining. Washington also ran in the two-point conversion and the score was tied at 20. Neither team could score before the end of regulation and overtime ensued. On USC's first drive, Otton passed to Rodney Sermons for a five-yard touchdown pass and the Trojans went ahead for the first time, 27–20. Jubilation erupted in the Coliseum when Mark Cusano batted down Ron Powlus' fourth-down pass for a Trojan victory. It was Lou Holtz's last game as coach of the Irish and his first loss to the Trojans. It was also the first overtime game in the series. Holtz compiled a 9–1–1 record against USC.

1998 – USC 10, Notre Dame 0
USC came into this matchup at 7–4 under first-year coach Paul Hackett while Notre Dame was 9–1 and hoping to secure a major bowl bid with a victory. Their chances were dealt a severe blow the previous week when quarterback Jarious Jackson suffered a knee injury on the last play of the game against LSU, sidelining him for the USC game. Without Jackson, the Irish offense was powerless, suffering its first shutout in this series since 1962. Notre Dame played in the Gator Bowl, losing to Georgia Tech.

1999 – Notre Dame 25, USC 24
In an otherwise dismal season by the Irish, Notre Dame overcame a 21-point deficit to beat the Trojans 25–24 at Notre Dame stadium. The game winner came when Irish tight end Jabari Halloway recovered a Jarious Jackson fumble in the end zone with 2:40 remaining on the game clock. It marked the first time since 1996 that Notre Dame had beaten USC.

=== 2000s – USC's Dominance ===
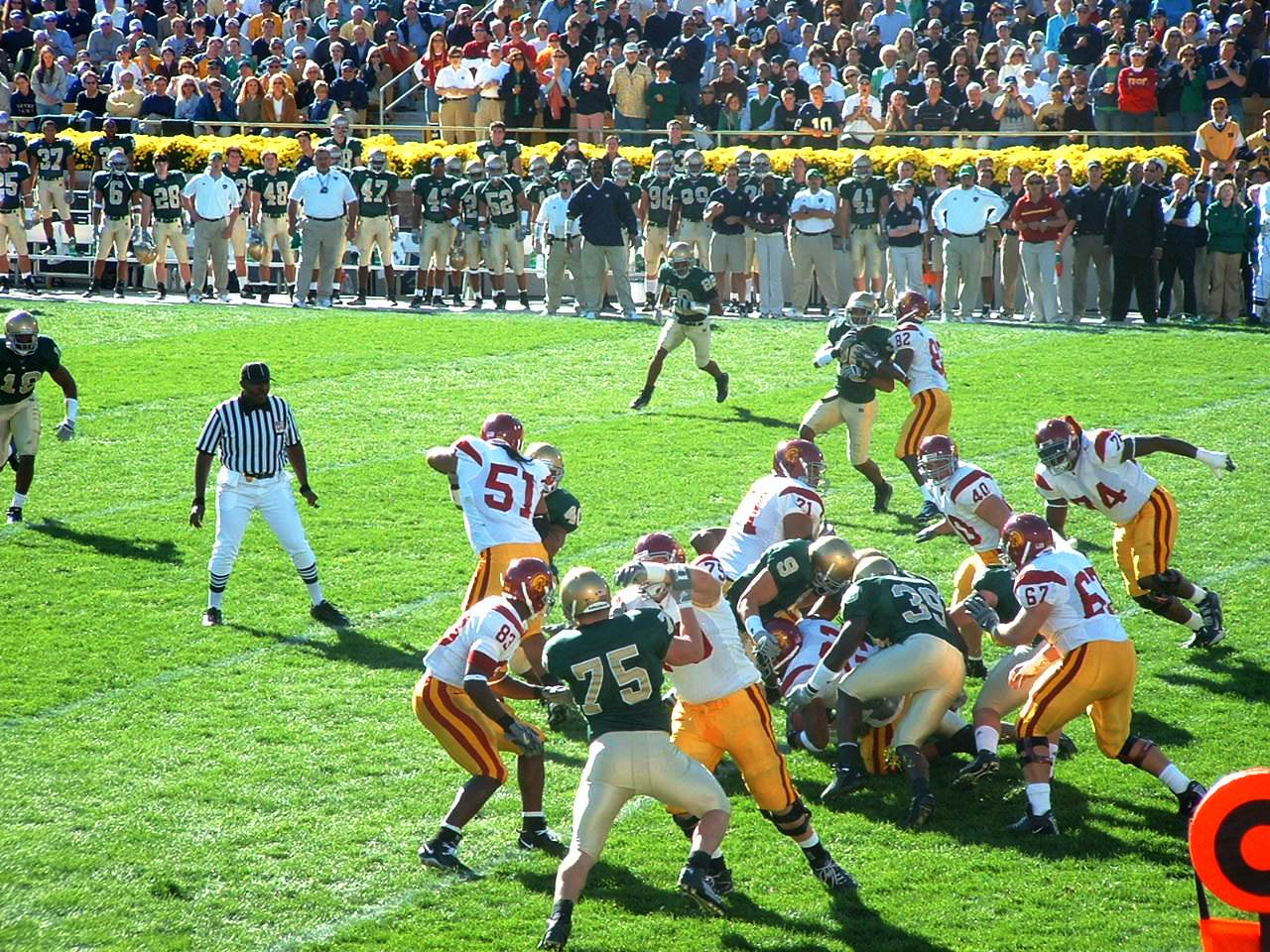
Notre Dame vs. USC (2005)

2000 – Notre Dame 38, USC 21
The Irish secured their first BCS bowl berth by beating the Trojans.

2001 – Notre Dame 27, USC 16
After an 0–3 start, the first in school history, Bob Davie's squad managed a win against USC in Indiana. It was the last win the Irish recorded against USC until 2010. Until 2009, the Irish were the only team to have beaten a Pete-Carroll-coached Trojan squad by more than seven points.

From 2002 – 2009, USC defeated Notre Dame eight straight times, in some games winning in a lopsided fashion unprecedented in the series. Despite the one-sided nature of this stretch, the series still produced a classic game in 2005.

2002 – USC 44, Notre Dame 13

This game reestablished USC on a national level after a decade-long absence from the elite ranks. The Trojans had not played in such a high-stakes game since the 1988 No. 1 vs. No. 2 loss to the Irish. The victory for the Trojans helped them clinch their first-ever BCS bowl berth and established Trojan quarterback Carson Palmer as a Heisman Trophy candidate, which he eventually won. The game culminated USC's most successful season since 1979. A capacity crowd and a national television audience saw USC quarterback Carson Palmer throw for 425 yards and four touchdowns, at the time Notre Dame opponent records. Palmer led the Trojan offense to 610 total yards, the most yards ever against the Irish. Notre Dame briefly took a 13–10 lead, but Palmer led the Trojans on a 75-yard drive in just over a minute, culminating in a pass that sailed over the outstretched hands of two Irish defenders and into the waiting arms of Mike Williams for a 19-yard touchdown. The Trojans sprinted into the locker room with a 17–13 halftime lead. USC's 44 points were the most against the Irish by a USC team since Troy's 55–24 victory in 1974.

2005 – USC 34, Notre Dame 31 "The Bush Push"

After beating the Irish by 31 points each of the past three years, the Trojans came into Indiana to meet Notre Dame and first-year head coach Charlie Weis. The Irish players entered the stadium before the game wearing green jerseys, which put the crowd into a frenzy. A close game throughout, the Irish took the lead with two minutes left on a Brady Quinn touchdown run. The Trojans stormed back after a 4th and 9 pass by Matt Leinart to Dwayne Jarrett that brought the ball inside the ND 15-yard line. As Leinart scrambled and tried to dive into the end zone, he was hit hard short of the goal line, and the ball was knocked out of bounds with seven seconds to go. However, the clock continued to count down, and after it hit zero, the Irish fans began to storm the field. There was no replay in this game at the request of coach Pete Carroll, but after huddling, the officials spotted the ball on the one-yard line and put seven seconds back on the clock. On the next play, instead of spiking the ball and kicking a field goal to secure a tie that would have resulted in overtime, the Trojan offense surprised the Irish by running the ball. Trojan running back Reggie Bush pushed Matt Leinart into the end zone. Although this was against the rules at that time, the referees awarded USC the winning touchdown. Weis said he would hope his running back would make a play like that in a similar situation. The Trojans went on to lose to the Texas Longhorns in the BCS Championship Game.

In 2010, USC was sanctioned by the NCAA for displaying a lack of institutional control for its football, men's basketball, and women's tennis programs. As a result, all USC football victories from December 2004 through the 2005 season were vacated, including this game. These sanctions have been criticized by some NCAA football writers, including ESPN's Ted Miller, who wrote, "It's become an accepted fact among informed college football observers that the NCAA sanctions against USC were a travesty of justice, and the NCAA's refusal to revisit that travesty are a massive act of cowardice on the part of the organization."

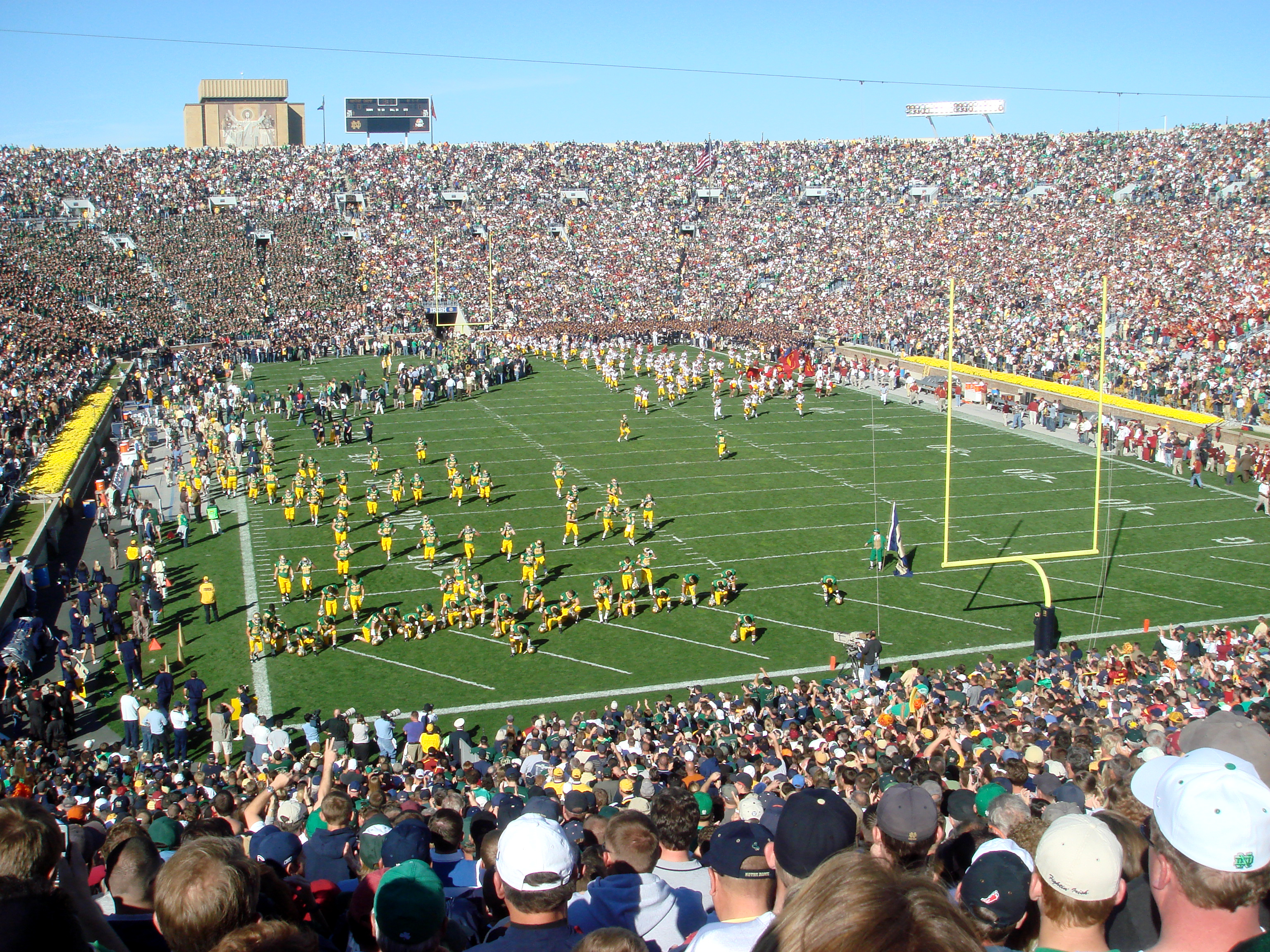
Notre Dame and USC take the field in the 79th edition of the rivalry.

2007 – USC 38, Notre Dame 0

This was the largest margin of victory for the Trojans over the Irish. It was also USC's first shutout against them since 1998. USC came into this game 5–1, while Notre Dame came in 1–6. Notre Dame head coach Charlie Weis announced during that summer that his team would wear throwback green jerseys for the matchup, marking the 30-year anniversary of the Irish beating the Trojans in their green jerseys in 1977 when Weis was a senior at Notre Dame. Because of John David Booty's injured finger, USC backup quarterback Mark Sanchez was the starter in his second game at the position. Sanchez completed 21 of 38 passes with a combined total of 235 yards and 4 touchdown passes. This was the Trojans' 6th consecutive victory over the Irish. In the process, they became only the third team to accomplish this feat.

=== 2010s ===
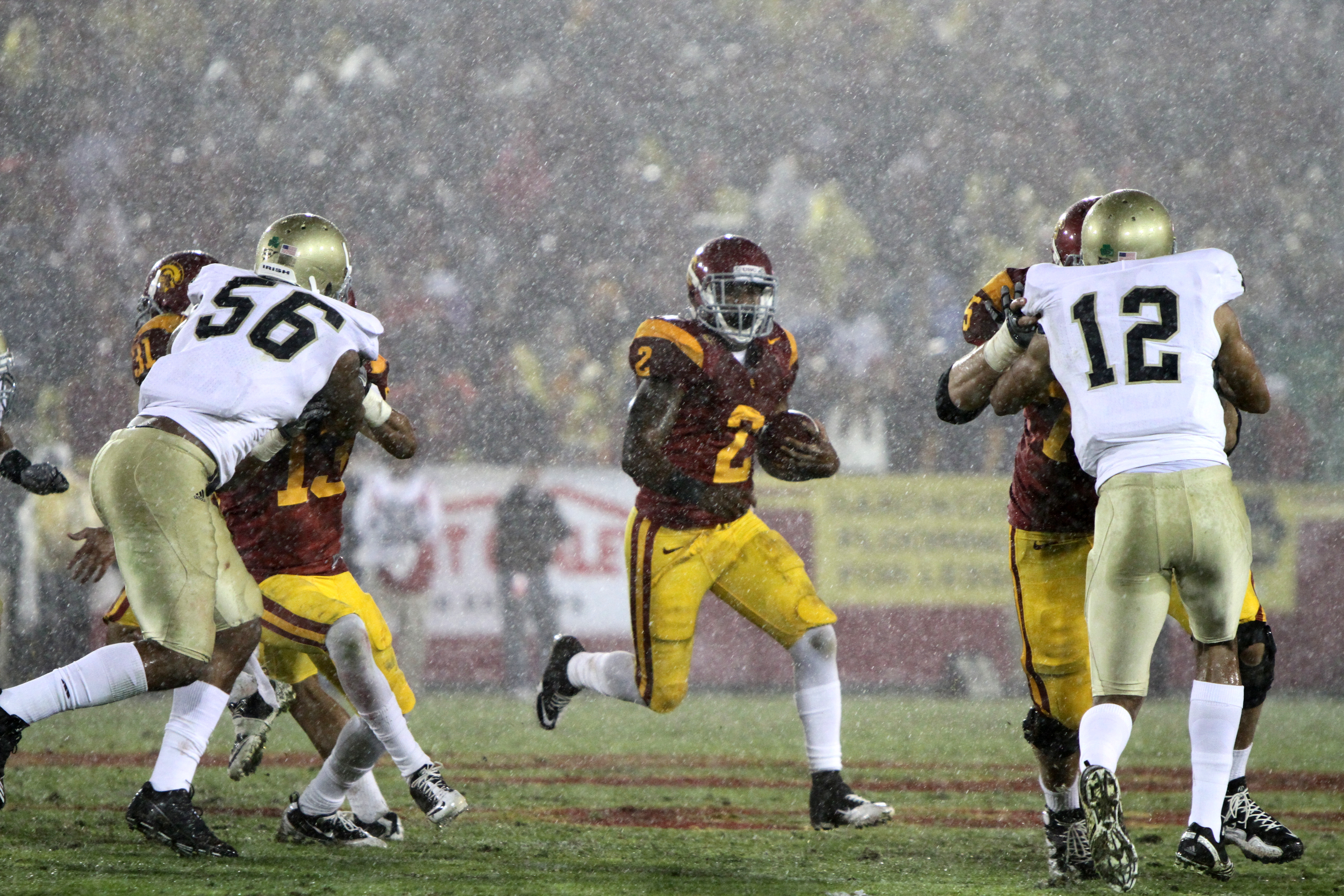
USC Trojans fell to the Notre Dame Fighting Irish 20-16 at the Los Angeles Memorial Coliseum November 27, 2010

After eight straight victories by USC, the 2010s were a period of relative dominance by Notre Dame, as the Irish won 7 out of 10 games after Pete Carroll left USC to become the head coach of the Seattle Seahawks. While USC had four different coaches during the 2010s, Brian Kelly was the Irish's head coach for the entire decade.

2010 – Notre Dame 20, USC 16

For the first time since 1941, both teams faced each other with first-year head coaches who had never met and did not know each other. With the Irish coming off of two stellar performances against #14 Utah and Army (27–3 at Yankee Stadium), Notre Dame was riding high, while USC was one week removed from one of their most one-sided defeats in the last decade, a 36–7 loss to the Oregon State Beavers and would be starting fifth-year senior and backup QB Mitch Mustain for the first time due to an injury to starter Matt Barkley. Three key touchdown drives all taking place in the last three minutes of either half and a dropped pass by Ronald Johnson with a little over a minute remaining in the game led the Irish to their first victory over USC since 2001. They would go on to defeat Miami in the Sun Bowl and finish 8–5 under new coach Brian Kelly.

2011 – USC 31, Notre Dame 17

USC defeated Notre Dame on the road for an unprecedented fifth-straight win in Indiana. It was the first night game played at Notre Dame in 21 years. The turning point came in the third quarter. Down 17–10, Notre Dame drove all the way to the USC 1-yard-line and was poised to tie the score when a fumbled snap from center was returned the other way for a touchdown by USC's Jawanza Starling to make the score 24–10. For the game, Notre Dame debuted a brighter gold helmet that more closely matched the shade of the university's golden dome atop its Administration building. Nearly 50 recruits attended the game.

2012 – Notre Dame 22, USC 13

Going into the game, the teams found themselves in an unforeseen reversal of preseason expectations. Notre Dame was ranked #1 in the AP poll after being unranked in that poll to start the season, while USC entered the game unranked after starting the season as the preseason #1 team. With a balanced offensive attack and several late goal-line stands on defense, Notre Dame won the game 22–13. The Irish held on to their #1 BCS ranking and propelled themselves to the BCS Championship Game in Miami. With more than 16 million viewers, it was the most-watched regular-season college football game on ABC since 2006 and the most-viewed ABC Saturday night game ever. Notre Dame vacated this win in 2016 after "the NCAA determined that a Notre Dame trainer committed academic misconduct for two football players and provided six other players with extra benefits;" the NCAA identified one player who was ineligible for every game in the 2012 season and another player who was ineligible for every game in the 2013 season.

2014 – USC 49, Notre Dame 14

Both teams were ranked in the preseason, with USC at #15 in both the AP and Coaches Polls while Notre Dame was #17 in both polls. Going into the game, both teams were unranked with identical 7–4 records. With a 49–14 victory, USC scored its highest points in the series in 40 years (#6 USC's 55–24 victory over #5 Notre Dame in 1974) and the highest score by either team in the series in 37 years (#11 Notre Dame's 49–19 victory over #5 USC in 1977). USC Quarterback Cody Kessler threw six touchdown passes, the first time in Notre Dame history that any team had ever made six touchdown passes against the Irish.

2017 – Notre Dame 49, USC 14

Both teams entered the game ranked once again, with USC at #11 and Notre Dame at #13 in the AP poll. Each team brought a 5-1 record into the primetime TV matchup under the lights in Indiana. The Irish defense would set the tone early by recovering a fumble by quarterback Sam Darnold on the Trojans' 1st play on offense, the first of 3 turnovers committed by USC during the game. The Irish would lean heavily on their running game, rushing for 377 yards and scoring 5 touchdowns. Running back Josh Adams led the way with 191 yards on the ground and 3 touchdowns. Quarterback Brandon Wimbush added 106 rushing yards and 2 rushing touchdowns, in addition to going 9 of 19 passing for 120 yards and 2 passing touchdowns.

2018 – Notre Dame 24, USC 17

The Fighting Irish flew into Los Angeles for this Thanksgiving weekend game undefeated and ranked #3 in the country. The Trojans were 5–6 and still had a chance at a bowl game bid. The underdog Trojan hosts gave their Fighting Irish guests a scare in the early going by taking a 10–0 lead. However, Notre Dame got the offense going late in the second quarter, and quarterback Ian Book led his team to 24 unanswered points. He completed 22 of 39 passes for 352 yards. The Trojans' true freshman quarterback JT Daniels completed 7 out of 10 passes in a late drive which culminated in a 20-yard touchdown pass to Tyler Vaughns with 48 seconds left. However, the subsequent onside kick failed and Notre Dame ran the clock out to complete an undefeated regular season.

=== 2020s ===
2023 – Notre Dame 48, USC 20

The #21 ranked Fighting Irish welcomed an undefeated and #10 ranked USC to Indiana for the team's first home game of the rivalry under Marcus Freeman. The Irish had previously suffered loses to Ohio State and Louisville. In the end, Notre Dame's defense would be too much for USC. Xavier Watts intercepted Caleb Williams twice, along with recovering a fumble that Watts returned for a touchdown. Williams threw one additional interception, and in total the team turned the ball over five times. A late touchdown by the Trojans put the game back within reach, but the Irish quickly responded with a 99-yard return for a touchdown on the kickoff. This was the 5th consecutive loss for USC at Notre Dame Stadium.

=== Pause and future ===
The two schools failed to reach an agreement on future games after the 2025 season, largely due to disagreements over the timing of the game during the season. USC had reportedly sought for the game to be played in the early weeks of the season, a time when most other schools typically schedule non-conference opponents. The schools agreed to resume the games starting in the 2030 NCAA football season through the 2033 season with games being played in Week 1 in year 2030 and 2031 and Week 1, 2 or 3 in year 2032 and 2033.

== Jeweled Shillelagh ==
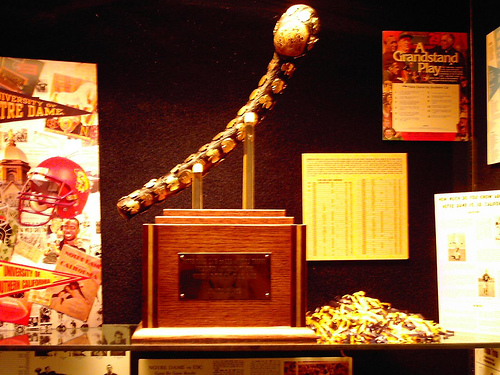
The First Jeweled Shillelagh, awarded to the winner of the annual USC vs. Notre Dame game.

The Jeweled Shillelagh (shi-LAY-lee) is the trophy awarded to the winner of the annual Notre Dame–USC football rivalry game. The shillelagh, an Irish club, is made of oak or blackthorn saplings from Ireland. On the end of the club is engraved the following: From the Emerald Isle. The trophy was introduced in 1952 to commemorate the first game in the series played on December 4, 1926. The trophy was donated by the Notre Dame Alumni Club of Los Angeles, stating that "this shillelagh will serve to symbolize in part the high tradition, the keen rivalry, and above all the sincere respect which these two great universities have for each other."

For each victory, a respective jeweled ornament is added to the foot-long club. For each USC victory, a ruby-adorned Trojan head is added, marked with the year and game score; for each Notre Dame victory, a similarly detailed emerald-studded shamrock is added. For tie games, a combined Trojan head/shamrock medallion is used (in 1996 NCAA changed the rules to allow for overtime and thus no more ties are possible). Although the shillelagh was introduced in 1952, the medallions go back to the start of the series in 1926. In 1996, after USC defeated Notre Dame for the first time in 14 years, Notre Dame did not turn over the shillelagh, stating that it had run out of space for the Trojan heads and shamrocks after the 1989 game. The original shillelagh was retired in a 1995 ceremony and is now permanently displayed at Notre Dame. Instead, Jim Gillis, former head of the Notre Dame Club of Los Angeles, commissioned a second shillelagh, longer than the original and handcrafted from a blackthorn in County Leitrim with gold and jeweled medallions made by Images Jewelers of Elkhart, Indiana.

== Game results ==
Notre Dame victories	USC victories	Tie games	Vacated wins (Note: USC's win in 2005 was vacated as a result of NCAA sanctions against the USC football program issued on June 10, 2010, after the NCAA found that Reggie Bush received improper gifts. This win is not included in USC's all-time record, nor is it counted in the series record between the two teams. See Wikipedia:WikiProject College football/Vacated victories for an explanation of how vacated victories are recorded.) (Note: Notre Dame's wins in 2012 and 2013 were vacated as a result of NCAA sanctions against the Notre Dame football program issued on November 22, 2016, after the NCAA found that a student-trainer committed academic misconduct for two football players and provided six other players with impermissible academic extra benefits. The NCAA also rejected Notre Dame's appeal on February 13, 2018. This win is not included in Notre Dame's all-time record, nor is it counted in the series record between the two teams. See Wikipedia:WikiProject College football/Vacated victories for an explanation of how vacated victories are recorded.)

No.	Date	Location	Winner	Score
1	December 4, 1926	Los Angeles, CA	Notre Dame	13–12
2	November 26, 1927	Chicago, IL	Notre Dame	7–6
3	December 1, 1928	Los Angeles, CA	USC	27–14
4	November 16, 1929	Chicago, IL	Notre Dame	13–12
5	December 6, 1930	Los Angeles, CA	Notre Dame	27–0
6	November 21, 1931	Notre Dame, IN	USC	16–14
7	December 10, 1932	Los Angeles, CA	USC	13–0
8	November 25, 1933	Notre Dame, IN	USC	19–0
9	December 8, 1934	Los Angeles, CA	Notre Dame	14–0
10	November 23, 1935	Notre Dame, IN	Notre Dame	20–13
11	December 5, 1936	Los Angeles, CA	Tie	13–13
12	November 27, 1937	Notre Dame, IN	#9 Notre Dame	13–6
13	December 3, 1938	Los Angeles, CA	#8 USC	13–0
14	November 25, 1939	Notre Dame, IN	#4 USC	20–12
15	December 7, 1940	Los Angeles, CA	Notre Dame	10–6
16	November 22, 1941	Notre Dame, IN	#4 Notre Dame	20–18
17	November 28, 1942	Los Angeles, CA	#8 Notre Dame	13–0
18	November 30, 1946	Notre Dame, IN	#2 Notre Dame	26–6
19	December 6, 1947	Los Angeles, CA	#1 Notre Dame	38–7
20	December 4, 1948	Los Angeles, CA	Tie	14–14
21	November 26, 1949	Notre Dame, IN	#1 Notre Dame	32–0
22	December 2, 1950	Los Angeles, CA	USC	9–7
23	December 1, 1951	Los Angeles, CA	Notre Dame	19–12
24	November 29, 1952	Notre Dame, IN	#7 Notre Dame	9–0
25	November 28, 1953	Los Angeles, CA	#2 Notre Dame	48–14
26	November 27, 1954	Notre Dame, IN	#4 Notre Dame	23–17
27	November 26, 1955	Los Angeles, CA	USC	42–20
28	December 1, 1956	Los Angeles, CA	#17 USC	28–20
29	November 30, 1957	Notre Dame, IN	#12 Notre Dame	40–12
30	November 29, 1958	Los Angeles, CA	#18 Notre Dame	20–13
31	November 28, 1959	Notre Dame, IN	Notre Dame	16–6
32	November 26, 1960	Los Angeles, CA	Notre Dame	17–0
33	October 14, 1961	Notre Dame, IN	#8 Notre Dame	30–0
34	December 1, 1962	Los Angeles, CA	#1 USC	25–0
35	October 12, 1963	Notre Dame, IN	Notre Dame	17–14
36	November 28, 1964	Los Angeles, CA	USC	20–17
37	October 23, 1965	Notre Dame, IN	#7 Notre Dame	28–7
38	November 26, 1966	Los Angeles, CA	#1 Notre Dame	51–0
39	October 14, 1967	Notre Dame, IN	#1 USC	24–7
40	November 30, 1968	Los Angeles, CA	Tie	21–21
41	October 18, 1969	Notre Dame, IN	Tie	14–14
42	November 28, 1970	Los Angeles, CA	USC	38–28
43	October 23, 1971	Notre Dame, IN	USC	28–14
44	December 2, 1972	Los Angeles, CA	#1 USC	45–23
45	October 27, 1973	Notre Dame, IN	#8 Notre Dame	23–14
46	November 30, 1974	Los Angeles, CA	#6 USC	55–24
47	October 25, 1975	Notre Dame, IN	#3 USC	24–17
48	November 27, 1976	Los Angeles, CA	#3 USC	17–13
49	October 22, 1977	Notre Dame, IN	#11 Notre Dame	49–19

No.	Date	Location	Winner	Score
50	November 25, 1978	Los Angeles, CA	#3 USC	27–25
51	October 20, 1979	Notre Dame, IN	#4 USC	42–23
52	December 6, 1980	Los Angeles, CA	#17 USC	20–3
53	October 24, 1981	Notre Dame, IN	#5 USC	14–7
54	November 27, 1982	Los Angeles, CA	#17 USC	17–13
55	October 22, 1983	Notre Dame, IN	Notre Dame	27–6
56	November 24, 1984	Los Angeles, CA	Notre Dame	19–7
57	October 26, 1985	Notre Dame, IN	Notre Dame	37–3
58	November 29, 1986	Los Angeles, CA	Notre Dame	38–37
59	October 24, 1987	Notre Dame, IN	#10 Notre Dame	26–15
60	November 26, 1988	Los Angeles, CA	#1 Notre Dame	27–10
61	October 21, 1989	Notre Dame, IN	#1 Notre Dame	28–24
62	November 24, 1990	Los Angeles, CA	#7 Notre Dame	10–6
63	October 26, 1991	Notre Dame, IN	#5 Notre Dame	24–20
64	November 28, 1992	Los Angeles, CA	#5 Notre Dame	31–23
65	October 23, 1993	Notre Dame, IN	#2 Notre Dame	31–13
66	November 26, 1994	Los Angeles, CA	Tie	17–17
67	October 21, 1995	Notre Dame, IN	#17 Notre Dame	38–10
68	November 30, 1996	Los Angeles, CA	USC	27–20
69	October 18, 1997	Notre Dame, IN	USC	20–17
70	November 28, 1998	Los Angeles, CA	USC	10–0
71	October 16, 1999	Notre Dame, IN	Notre Dame	25–24
72	November 25, 2000	Los Angeles, CA	#11 Notre Dame	38–21
73	October 20, 2001	Notre Dame, IN	Notre Dame	27–16
74	November 30, 2002	Los Angeles, CA	#6 USC	44–13
75	October 18, 2003	Notre Dame, IN	#4 USC	45–14
76	November 27, 2004	Los Angeles, CA	#1 USC	41–10
77	October 15, 2005	Notre Dame, IN	#1 USC^{†}	34–31
78	November 26, 2006	Los Angeles, CA	#2 USC	44–24
79	October 20, 2007	Notre Dame, IN	#9 USC	38–0
80	November 29, 2008	Los Angeles, CA	#5 USC	38–3
81	October 17, 2009	Notre Dame, IN	#6 USC	34–27
82	November 27, 2010	Los Angeles, CA	Notre Dame	20–16
83	October 22, 2011	Notre Dame, IN	USC	31–17
84	November 24, 2012	Los Angeles, CA	#1 Notre Dame^{‡}	22–13
85	October 19, 2013	Notre Dame, IN	Notre Dame^{‡}	14–10
86	November 29, 2014	Los Angeles, CA	USC	49–14
87	October 17, 2015	Notre Dame, IN	#14 Notre Dame	41–31
88	November 26, 2016	Los Angeles, CA	#12 USC	45–27
89	October 21, 2017	Notre Dame, IN	#13 Notre Dame	49–14
90	November 24, 2018	Los Angeles, CA	#3 Notre Dame	24–17
91	October 12, 2019	Notre Dame, IN	#9 Notre Dame	30–27
92	October 23, 2021	Notre Dame, IN	#13 Notre Dame	31–16
93	November 26, 2022	Los Angeles, CA	#6 USC	38–27
94	October 14, 2023	Notre Dame, IN	#21 Notre Dame	48–20
95	November 30, 2024	Los Angeles, CA	#5 Notre Dame	49–35
96	October 18, 2025	Notre Dame, IN	#13 Notre Dame	34–24
Series: Notre Dame leads 51–37–5
† Vacated by USC ‡ Vacated by Notre Dame

== In popular culture ==
- When Michael Corleone visits Miami in The Godfather Part II, Hyman Roth is listening to the 1958 Notre Dame vs. USC game.
- In the movie Die Hard (1988), an accomplice of Hans Gruber (played by Alan Rickman), Eddie (played by Dennis Hayden), is watching a Notre Dame vs. USC football game on television while posing as a security guard at Nakatomi Plaza. In the scene, Eddie is sitting at the security desk with Sgt. Al Powell (played by Reginald VelJohnson), who is unaware of the ongoing takeover of the building. The television broadcast can be heard announcing, "Notre Dame on top of USC". However, the film takes place on Christmas Eve (December 24), a date when the two teams have never played.
- An episode of American Gladiators featured a competition between star USC players Anthony Davis and Charles White and Notre Dame stars Allen Pinkett and Vagas Ferguson.
- In the third season of The Sopranos in the episode "Fortunate Son", Tony Soprano has a flashback to his childhood where Notre Dame vs. USC is playing on TV. The Notre Dame Victory March is played in this scene.
- A 2008 episode of Family Feud featured competition between the two schools.
- The November 22, 2017, episode of The Price Is Right featured competition between the two schools.

== See also ==
- List of NCAA college football rivalry games
