= Tim Foley =

Tim Foley may refer to:

- Tim Foley (defensive back) (1948–2023), American football player for the Miami Dolphins
- Tim Foley (offensive tackle) (born 1958), American football player for the Baltimore Colts

== See also ==
- Tim Foli (born 1950), American baseball player and coach
