= Ernie Hughes =

American football player (born 1955)

No. 65, 66, 61
- Position: Center / Guard

Personal information
- Born: January 24, 1955 (age 71); Boise, Idaho, U.S.
- Listed height: 6 ft 3 in (1.91 m)
- Listed weight: 259 lb (117 kg)

Career information
- High school: Capital (Boise)
- College: Notre Dame (1974–1977)
- NFL draft: 1978: 3rd round, 79th overall pick

Career history
- San Francisco 49ers (1978–1979); Washington Redskins (1980); San Francisco 49ers (1980); New York Giants (1981–1983)

Awards and highlights
- National champion (1977); Second-team All-American (1977)

Career NFL statistics
- Games played: 45
- Games started: 29
- Fumble recoveries: 2
- Stats at Pro Football Reference

Ernest Loyal Hughes Jr. (born January 24, 1955) is an American former professional football player who was an offensive lineman for five seasons in the National Football League (NFL) with the San Francisco 49ers and New York Giants. He was selected by the 49ers in the third round of the 1978 NFL draft after playing college football for the Notre Dame Fighting Irish.

== Early life and college ==
Ernest Loyal Hughes Jr. was born on January 24, 1955, in Boise, Idaho. He attended Capital High School in Boise.

Hughes played college football for the Notre Dame Fighting Irish of the University of Notre Dame from 1974 to 1977. He was named a second-team All-American by both the Associated Press and United Press International his senior year in 1977. The 1977 Fighting Irish were consensus national champions.

== Professional career ==
Hughes was selected by the San Francisco 49ers in the third round, with the 79th overall pick, of the 1978 NFL draft. He officially signed with the team on June 20. He played in 15 games, starting 11, during his rookie year in 1978. Hughes was placed on injured reserve on August 21, 1979, and spent the entire season there. He was released by the 49ers on September 1, 1980.

Hughes signed with the Washington Redskins on September 16, 1980, after Phil DuBois suffered an injury. Hughes was released three days later, without appearing in a game, after the team re-signed Dan Nugent.

He was re-signed by the 49ers on October 18, 1980, and played in three games before being released again on November 5, 1980.

Hughes signed with the New York Giants in February 1981. He started the first ten games of the 1981 season before being placed on injured reserve on November 10, 1981. He appeared in five games, starting two, in 1982. Hughes played in 12 games, starting six, during his final NFL season in 1983. He was released by the Giants on August 20, 1984.

== Personal life ==
Hughes was later the vice president and director of operations for the CarrAmerica Realty Corporation. He was also the founder and co-chair of the Notre Dame Celebrity Golf Classic.
