= Leslie Bodnar =

American physician

Leslie Mathew Bodnar (1916–2014) was a sports medicine practitioner and former physician for the Notre Dame football team.

== Early life ==
Bodnar was born in the far south side of Chicago. He was the son of Hungarian immigrants. He received his Bachelor of Science degree from the University of Illinois in 1939 and his medical degree from the University of Illinois College of Medicine in 1941 and went on to pursue his medical internship and surgical orthopedic residency at Charity Hospital in New Orleans. He served as an orthopedic surgeon in the United States Army during World War II (from 1943 – 1946) and achieved the rank of Captain before returning to finish his orthopedic residency in New Orleans.

== Career ==
Bodnar worked as an orthopedic surgeon, setting up a practice in 1947 in South Bend. This later became the South Bend Orthopaedic Surgery and Sports Medicine Clinic. From 1949 to 1985, he worked at the University of Notre Dame as an orthopedic surgeon and served as its Director of Sports Medicine from 1976 to 1985 and as a senior consultant after that. He also taught at Notre Dame's extension of the Indiana University School of Medicine.

Bodnar was a pioneer of sports medicine in the United States. In the 1960s, the phrase “sports medicine” was not mentioned in medical schools or residency programs. Faculty discussed the treatment of knee and shoulder injuries in athletes but, as an academic specialty, sports medicine did not exist. In 1972, Bodnar, along with other orthopedic surgeons, founded the American Orthopaedic Society for Sports Medicine (AOSSM). Bodnar served as one of the first presidents of AOSSM from 1976–1977. During his tenure as president, he helped facilitate formalization of relationships with organizations like NATA and the U.S. Olympic Committee. Bodnar also was responsible for stimulating the development of a Commission on Sports Medicine, under the Indiana State Medical Association. He was honored with the Mr. Sports Medicine Award in 1978 and is now also a member of the American Orthopaedic Society for Sports Medicine Hall of Fame.

Bodnar helped warm up Joe Montana during Notre Dame’s come from behind victory in the 1979 Cotton Bowl Classic. During the game, Montana's body temperature had dipped to 96 degrees and he was battling hypothermia. He was forced to retire to the locker room where Bodnar fed him chicken soup to warm him up. He recovered and was able to get back to the game. This story was published as Chicken Soup to the Rescue, in Chicken Soup for the Sports Fan's Soul, as part of the Chicken Soup for the Soul book series.

Bodnar served on the board of Cerebral Palsy Society, American Red Cross, and the Indiana Governor’s Council on Fitness and Health. He also served on the board of the Sister Maura Brannick Health Center where he volunteered for many years.

In 1988 Bodnar was awarded the honor of Sagamore of the Wabash by Governor Robert Orr in 1988, recognizing his contributions to sports medicine and the NATA. He also received the EM Morris Award from Indiana University South Bend and was inducted into the Order of Malta.

== Personal life ==
Bodnar retired in 1999. He authored two books late in life. His first book, Carnie (2010), is a memoir of the days he spent as a young teenager in the 1920s working as a part of his father's carnival. His second book, Sports Medicine, Notre Dame (2014) covers memories from this 35 years working in Sports Medicine at Notre Dame.

In 1943, Bodnar married fellow Chicagoan, Bernardine Brennan, with whom he enjoyed 56 years of marriage until her death. Bodnar died in 2014 at the age of 98. He was survived by his nine children, 24 grandchildren and 15 great grandchildren.
