= Doug Becker =

American football player (born 1956)

No. 51, 52
- Position: Linebacker

Personal information
- Born: June 27, 1956 (age 70); Hamilton, Ohio, U.S.
- Listed height: 6 ft 0 in (1.83 m)
- Listed weight: 220 lb (100 kg)

Career information
- College: Notre Dame
- NFL draft: 1978: 10th round, 268th overall pick

Career history
- Chicago Bears (1978); Buffalo Bills (1978)

Awards and highlights
- National champion (1977)

Career NFL statistics
- Games played: 9
- Stats at Pro Football Reference

Douglas James Becker (born June 27, 1956) is an American former professional football player who was a linebacker for one season in the National Football League (NFL) with the Chicago Bears and Buffalo Bills. He played college football for the Notre Dame Fighting Irish.

== Early life ==
Becker was born in Hamilton, Ohio, and he attended the University of Notre Dame in South Bend, Indiana, where he played college football.

== Professional career ==
Becker was selected in the 10th round of the 1978 NFL draft by the Pittsburgh Steelers. Becker was among the final group of players waived by the Steelers in getting down to the 45-man roster limit. He was claimed off waivers by the Chicago Bears. After appearing in the Bears' season opener he was cut by the team. He was later picked up by the Buffalo Bills with whom he played the final eight games of the 1978 campaign.

== Personal life ==
Becker was the VP of Sales at RC Cola in Evansville, Indiana (local, family owned, beverage bottler) for four years. His "football" and "team like" mentality allowed him to excel greatly as a leader at RC Cola. He retired from RC Cola in 2015 to move back to his hometown and spend time with his new grandchild.
