= Willie Fry =

American football player (1955–1998)

No. 62
- Positions: Defensive end, defensive tackle

Personal information
- Born: February 23, 1955; Memphis, Tennessee, U.S.
- Died: July 10, 1998 (aged 43); New York, New York, U.S.

Career information
- College: Notre Dame
- NFL draft: 1978: 2nd round, 49th overall pick

Career history
- Pittsburgh Steelers (1978–1980)*; San Francisco 49ers (1979)*
- * Offseason or practice squad member only

Awards and highlights
- 2× Super Bowl champion (XIII, XIV); National champion (1973 and 1977); Second-team All-American (1977); Gator Bowl champion (1976); Sugar Bowl champion (1973); Orange Bowl champion (1975)

Willie Fry, Jr. (February 23, 1955 – July 10, 1998) was an American professional football player who was with the Pittsburgh Steelers football team from 1978 to 1980 and played college football at Notre Dame from 1973 to 1977.

He was selected by the Steelers in the second round of the 1978 NFL draft but was placed on the injured reserve list before the season stated. In the offseason he was traded to the 49ers, but the trade was voided when he failed the physical. The Steelers again placed him on the injured reserve before the 1979 season started and after the season he was waived. During those two seasons the Steelers won Super Bowl XIII and Super Bowl XIV, but Fry never took the field.

He died of a heart attack on July 10, 1998, in New York City.
