= Ted Burgmeier =

American football player (1955–2013)

No. 48
- Position: Safety

Personal information
- Born: November 8, 1955; Dubuque, Iowa, U.S.
- Died: July 7, 2013 (aged 57); East Dubuque, Illinois, U.S.
- Listed height: 5 ft 10 in (1.78 m)
- Listed weight: 185 lb (84 kg)

Career information
- High school: Dubuque (IA) Wahlert Catholic
- College: Notre Dame
- NFL draft: 1978: 5th round, 111th overall pick

Career history
- Kansas City Chiefs (1978)
- Stats at Pro Football Reference

Ted Joseph Burgmeier (November 8, 1955 – July 7, 2013) was an American professional football defensive back. He played for the Kansas City Chiefs in 1978.

He died of heart failure on July 7, 2013, in East Dubuque, Illinois, at the age of 57.
