= Luther Bradley =

American football player (born 1955)

No. 27
- Position: Defensive back

Personal information
- Born: May 7, 1955 (age 71); Florence, South Carolina, U.S.
- Listed height: 6 ft 2 in (1.88 m)
- Listed weight: 195 lb (88 kg)

Career information
- High school: Northside High School (Muncie, Indiana)
- College: Notre Dame
- NFL draft: 1978: 1st round, 11th overall pick

Career history
- Detroit Lions (1978–1981); Chicago Blitz (1983); Arizona Wranglers (1984); Houston Gamblers (1985)

Awards and highlights
- 2× National champion (1973, 1977); Consensus All-American (1977)

Career NFL statistics
- Interceptions: 9
- Fumble recoveries: 2
- Touchdowns: 1
- Stats at Pro Football Reference

Luther Alexander Bradley (born May 7, 1955) is an American former professional football player who was a cornerback for four seasons in the National Football League (NFL) for the Detroit Lions. He later played with the Chicago Blitz, Arizona Wranglers and Houston Gamblers of the United States Football League (USFL). He is the USFL's all-time interception leader.

Bradley earned the designation of a consensus All-American in 1977 for the national championship Notre Dame Fighting Irish. He also started as a freshman on the 1973 Notre Dame Fighting Irish football team.

== Personal life ==
Bradley is the brother of Bon Jovi drummer Everett Bradley. He is also the uncle of Detroit Lions executive Brad Holmes.
