= Ken MacAfee =

American football player (born 1956)

No. 81
- Position: Tight end

Personal information
- Born: January 9, 1956 (age 70); Portland, Oregon, U.S.
- Listed height: 6 ft 4 in (1.93 m)
- Listed weight: 250 lb (113 kg)

Career information
- High school: Brockton (Brockton, Massachusetts)
- College: Notre Dame
- NFL draft: 1978: 1st round, 7th overall pick

Career history
- San Francisco 49ers (1978–1979)

Awards and highlights
- National champion (1977); Walter Camp Award (1977); Knute Rockne Memorial Trophy (1977); Unanimous All-American (1977); Consensus All-American (1976); First-team All-American (1975)

Career NFL statistics
- Receptions: 46
- Receiving yards: 471
- Touchdowns: 5
- Stats at Pro Football Reference
- College Football Hall of Fame

Kenneth Adams MacAfee II (born January 9, 1956) is an American former professional football player who was a tight end for the San Francisco 49ers of the National Football League (NFL). He played college football for the Notre Dame Fighting Irish.

== Early life ==
MacAfee grew up in Brockton, Massachusetts and was a star as a high school player at Brockton High School. He emerged as a star as a sophomore, and as a junior, he led the Brockton Boxers to the first Massachusetts high school scholastic "Super Bowl"—the state championship game, which Brockton won. After the season MacAfee was selected as a First-team All-American.

In his senior season, he caught 10 touchdown passes as his school went through a second straight undefeated season, scoring 360 points and allowing only 21 and again heading to the scholastic "Super Bowl." In that game, MacAfee caught four passes for 111 yards in a 41-0 win to seal a second consecutive state title. Again, MacAfee was an All-American selection. MacAfee finished his career with 23 touchdown receptions. In his four years at Brockton High School, the team was 33-3-1.

== College career ==
MacAfee was a three-time All-American at the University of Notre Dame—a First-team selection in 1975 and a consensus selection in 1976 and 1977. MacAfee was elected to the College Football Hall of Fame in 1997.

In 1977, he also was Academic All-America, won the Walter Camp Player of the Year Award and was third in voting for the Heisman Trophy. That year, he caught 54 passes for 797 yards and six touchdowns. In his time Notre Dame had a 38-9 record and was the National Champion in 1977, with Joe Montana quarterbacking the Irish team. In his collegiate career, he caught 128 career passes for 1,759 yards and 15 TDs, ranking third on Notre Dame career receiving chart. He was a participant in Hula Bowl and Japan Bowl after his senior season.

== Professional career ==
MacAfee played with the San Francisco 49ers in 1978-79 after being drafted seventh overall in the first round of the 1978 NFL draft. He was a starter in his rookie season he caught 22 passes with one going for a touchdown. He was a starter in his second season, 1979 and caught 24 passes for 4 touchdowns.

In 1980 MacAfee was asked to play guard for the 49ers, and not feeling suited to play that position, he left and began dental school. After the season his rights were traded to the Minnesota Vikings, but never played a regular season game with them. He was placed on injured reserve in September 1981.

== Post-football ==
He enrolled in the University of Pennsylvania School of Dental Medicine and obtained his degree in 1983. He set up a practice in dentistry and oral surgery and taught at the University of Pennsylvania. He now has his own practice in Waltham, Massachusetts, where he was once a hated rival of the Waltham High School football team. Additionally, MacAfee became active in United Way, Health Volunteers Overseas, Physicians Fighting Cancer, Homes for Homeless, AIDS Awareness Center, and Home for Wayward Children.
