= Kris Haines =

American football player (born 1957)

No. 19, 80, 83, 85, 89
- Position: Wide receiver

Personal information
- Born: July 23, 1957 (age 69); Akron, Ohio, U.S.
- Listed height: 5 ft 11 in (1.80 m)
- Listed weight: 183 lb (83 kg)

Career information
- High school: Sidney (Sidney, Ohio)
- College: Notre Dame
- NFL draft: 1979: 9th round, 233rd overall pick

Career history
- Washington Redskins (1979); Chicago Bears (1979-1981); Los Angeles Express (1983); Chicago Blitz (1984); Denver Gold (1985); Los Angeles Express (1985); Montreal Concordes (1985); Buffalo Bills (1987)

Awards and highlights
- National champion (1977)

Career NFL statistics
- Receptions: 4
- Receiving yards: 83
- Stats at Pro Football Reference

David Kris Haines (born July 23, 1957) is an American former professional football player who was a wide receiver in the National Football League (NFL) for the Washington Redskins, the Chicago Bears, and the Buffalo Bills. He played college football for the Notre Dame Fighting Irish and was selected in the ninth round of the 1979 NFL draft. He also played for the Chicago Blitz of the United States Football League (USFL) in 1984. He was special teams coach of the Chicago Enforcers of the XFL.

Haines is a Physical Education teacher, Athletic coach, and Karate instructor at The Catherine Cook School in Chicago, Illinois. He is now a gym teacher.

== Career statistics ==
College statistics
Season	Team	GP	Receiving				Rushing			
Season	Team	GP	Rec	Yds	Avg	TD	Att	Yds	Avg	TD
1975	Notre Dame	8	0	0	0	0	1	28	28.0	0
1976	Notre Dame	11	3	64	21.3	0	0	0	0	0
1977	Notre Dame	11	28	587	21.0	2	0	0	0	0
1978	Notre Dame	11	32	699	21.8	5	0	0	0	0
Career		41	63	1,350	21.4	7	1	28	28.0	0
