= Tim Foley (offensive tackle) =

American football player (born 1958)

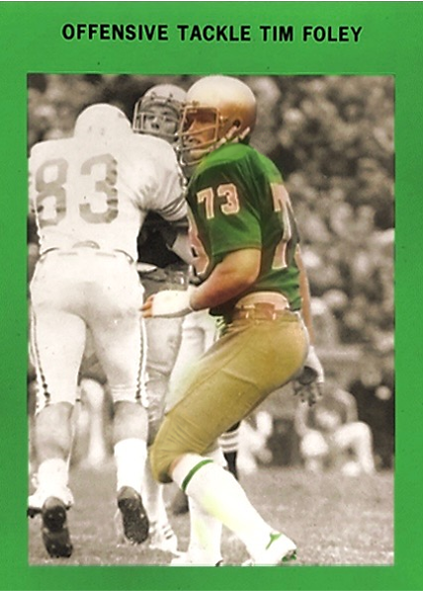

No. 73, 78
- Position: Offensive tackle

Personal information
- Born: May 30, 1958 (age 68); Cincinnati, Ohio, U.S.
- Listed height: 6 ft 6 in (1.98 m)
- Listed weight: 275 lb (125 kg)

Career information
- High school: Roger Bacon (St. Bernard, Ohio)
- College: Notre Dame
- NFL draft: 1980: 2nd round, 51st overall pick

Career history
- Baltimore Colts (1980–1982)

Awards and highlights
- National champion (1977); First-team All-American (1979)

Career NFL statistics
- Games played: 6
- Stats at Pro Football Reference

Timothy John Foley (born May 30, 1958) is an American former professional football player who was an offensive tackle for the Baltimore Colts of the National Football League (NFL). He played college football for the Notre Dame Fighting Irish.

Foley was a three-year starter at the University of Notre Dame under head coach Dan Devine. Foley played left tackle and blocked for quarterback Joe Montana. In 1977, the Fighting Irish were voted consensus national champions after defeating the previously unbeaten and No. 1 ranked Texas Longhorns in the Cotton Bowl Classic. During his senior year, Foley was named a team captain, along with running back Vagas Ferguson and safety Dave Waymer. Foley was a consensus College Football All-America team selection in 1979.

Foley was selected in the second round of the 1980 NFL draft by the Baltimore Colts. After three seasons with the Colts, he ended his professional football career in 1982.

Currently, Foley works at a life insurance and health group benefits company with his brother Dave Foley, who is a 1968 National Champion for the Ohio State Buckeyes and a former professional offensive lineman. Foley Benefits Group, LLC is based in Springfield, Ohio.
