= Jerome Heavens =

American gridiron football player (born 1957)

Jerome Heavens (born August 1, 1957) is a former Canadian football running back in the Canadian Football League (CFL) who played for the Toronto Argonauts. He played college football for the Notre Dame Fighting Irish.
