= Steve Heimkreiter =

American football player (1957–2020)

No. 58
- Position: Linebacker

Personal information
- Born: June 9, 1957; Cincinnati, Ohio, U.S.
- Died: December 3, 2020 (aged 63); Fort Thomas, Kentucky, U.S.
- Listed height: 6 ft 2 in (1.88 m)
- Listed weight: 228 lb (103 kg)

Career information
- High school: Roger Bacon
- College: Notre Dame
- NFL draft: 1979: 8th round, 197th overall pick

Career history
- Baltimore Colts (1979–1980)

Awards and highlights
- National champion (1977)
- Stats at Pro Football Reference

Steven Heimkreiter (June 9, 1957 – December 3, 2020) was an American football linebacker in the National Football League (NFL) who played for the Baltimore Colts. He played college football at the University of Notre Dame.

Heimkreiter died of cancer on December 3, 2020, in Fort Thomas, Kentucky, at the age of 63.
