= Vagas Ferguson =

American football player (born 1957)

No. 43, 24, 42, 26
- Position: Running back

Personal information
- Born: March 6, 1957 (age 69); Richmond, Indiana, U.S.
- Listed height: 6 ft 1 in (1.85 m)
- Listed weight: 204 lb (93 kg)

Career information
- High school: Richmond
- College: Notre Dame
- NFL draft: 1980: 1st round, 25th overall pick

Career history
- New England Patriots (1980–1982); Cleveland Browns (1983); Houston Oilers (1983); Chicago Blitz (1984); Tampa Bay Buccaneers (1985)*
- * Offseason or practice squad member only

Awards and highlights
- National champion (1977); Consensus All-American (1979)

Career NFL statistics
- Rushing yards: 1,163
- Rushing average: 4
- Rushing touchdowns: 5
- Stats at Pro Football Reference

Vasquero Diaz "Vagas" Ferguson (born March 6, 1957) is an American former professional football player who was a running back for five seasons in the National Football League (NFL) during the 1980s. Known as Road Runner for his quick bursts out of the backfield, Ferguson played college football for the Notre Dame Fighting Irish, and was recognized as an All-American. He was selected in the first round of the 1980 NFL draft, and played professionally for the New England Patriots, Cleveland Browns, and Houston Oilers of the NFL. He was born in Richmond, Indiana.

Ferguson was named the outstanding offensive player of the 1978 Cotton Bowl Classic, which Notre Dame won 38–10 over Texas. In 1979, his senior season at Notre Dame, Ferguson was voted to the All-America Team of the American Football Coaches Association. That year, he was the fifth ranked player in the nation in yards per rush and finished fifth in voting for the Heisman Trophy. He ranks third all-time for total yards gained (3,472) among Notre Dame running backs, having averaged 5.2 yards per carry.

Ferguson currently resides in Richmond, Indiana. He is employed at Richmond Community Schools, and is president of the local chapter of the National Association for the Advancement of Colored People (NAACP).

He is a member of the Indiana Football Hall of Fame.
