= Wayne Chapman (American football) =

American football player and coach (1937–2017)

Biographical details
- Born: September 26, 1937; Barboursville, West Virginia, U.S.
- Died: April 4, 2017 (aged 79); Winter Haven, Florida, U.S.

Playing career

Football
- 1955–1958: Morehead State

Basketball
- 1955–1959: Morehead State

Coaching career (HC unless noted)

Football
- 1960–1963: Auburndale HS (FL) (assistant)
- 1964–1967: Auburndale HS (FL)
- 1968–1970: Morehead State (assistant)
- 1971–1972: Colorado State (LB)
- 1973–1974: Tampa (DC)
- 1975: Youngstown State (DC)
- 1976–1978: Morehead State
- 1983–1984: Winter Haven HS (FL)
- 1986–1988: Winter Haven HS (FL)

Head coaching record
- Overall: 6–21–3 (college)

Sherwood Wayne Chapman (September 26, 1937 – April 4, 2017) was an American football player and coach. He served as the head football coach at Morehead State University in Morehead, Kentucky from 1976 to 1978, compiling a record of 6–21–3. There he coached future National Football League (NFL) quarterback Phil Simms.

== Head coaching record ==
=== College ===
Year	Team	Overall	Conference	Standing	Bowl/playoffs
Morehead State Eagles (Ohio Valley Conference) (1976–1978)
1976	Morehead State	2–9	2–5	T–7th	
1977	Morehead State	2–6–2	2–4–1	6th	
1978	Morehead State	2–6–1	1–5	T–5th	
Morehead State:		6–21–3	5–14–1		
Total:		6–21–3			
