= James McKinley (American football) =

American football player and coach (1945–2012)

Jim McKinley
Biographical details
- Born: February 25, 1945; Chicago, Illinois, U.S.
- Died: July 6, 2012 (aged 67); Tamarac, Florida, U.S.

Playing career
- 1963–1965: Western Michigan
- Position: Tight end

Coaching career (HC unless noted)
- 1966–1971: Allegan HS (MI)
- 1972–1973: Eastern Michigan (LB/RC)
- 1974–1976: Central State (OH)
- 1977–1981: North Carolina A&T
- 1982–1983: Prairie View A&M
- 1984: Oklahoma Outlaws (DL)
- 1985–1986: Missouri (DC/ILB)

Administrative career (AD unless noted)
- 1978–1980: North Carolina A&T (interim AD)

Head coaching record
- Overall: 46–64–1 (college)

Accomplishments and honors

Awards
- MEAC Coach of the Year (1980)

James Ruffin McKinley (February 25, 1945 – July 6, 2012) was an American football player, coach, and businessman. He coached football teams at several historically black colleges and universities, was a defensive coach for the Oklahoma Outlaws of the United States Football League (USFL), and served as executive director of the Heritage Bowl, which he helped create.

== Playing career ==
McKinley played at tight end for Western Michigan University's football team, was named to WMU's All Century Football Team in 2005 and was inducted into the WMU Athletic Hall of Fame in 1992.

== Coaching career ==
=== Central State ===
McKinley got his first head coaching position at Central State University in Wilberforce, Ohio from 1974 until the end of the 1976 seasons.

=== North Carolina A&T ===
After coaching at Central State, McKinley moved on to be the head football coach at North Carolina A&T State University from 1977 to 1981.

=== Prairie View A&M ===
McKinley was the 14th head football coach at Prairie View A&M University, serving two season, from 1982 to 1983, and compiling a record of 1–21.

=== Other coaching positions ===
McKinley's coaching career also took him to Eastern Michigan University, USFL’s Oklahoma Outlaws, where he served as defensive line coach, and the University of Missouri.

== Business accomplishments ==
McKinley started McKinley Financial Services, Inc., in Fort Lauderdale, Florida. The company has become one of the largest minority insurance agencies in the United States with over 50 agents and staff. He was awarded the 2007 Distinguished Alumni Award from Western Michigan University, where he received his Bachelor of Arts in 1966.

=== Heritage Bowl ===
In 1991, McKinley formulated the idea of the Heritage Bowl, an annual college football bowl game matching up two Division I-AA teams left out of the division's playoff system. McKinley served as the bowl's executive director in its first years. Despite massive financial losses, poor attendance, protests from neighborhood residents, and a lack of television coverage in its first year, the bowl continued to be played every year until 1999, when the game was discontinued.

== Head coaching record ==
Year	Team	Overall	Conference	Standing	Bowl/playoffs
Central State Marauders (NCAA Division II independent) (1974–1976)
1974	Central State	6–5			
1975	Central State	4–6			
1976	Central State	6–5			L Orange Blossom Classic
Central State:		16–16			
North Carolina A&T Aggies (Mid-Eastern Athletic Conference) (1977–1981)
1977	North Carolina A&T	7–4	5–1	2nd	
1978	North Carolina A&T	6–6	4–2	2nd	Gold Bowl
1979	North Carolina A&T	4–6–1	2–2–1	3rd	
1980	North Carolina A&T	9–3	3–2	2nd	Gold Bowl
1981	North Carolina A&T	3–8	0–5	6th	
North Carolina A&T:		29–27–1	14–12–1		
Prairie View A&M Panthers (Southwest Athletic Conference) (1982–1983)
1982	Prairie View A&M	1–10	0–6	7th	
1983	Prairie View A&M	0–11	0–6	T–7th	
Prairie View A&M:		1–21	0–12		
Total:		46–64–1			
