= Marino Casem =

American football coach (1934–2020)

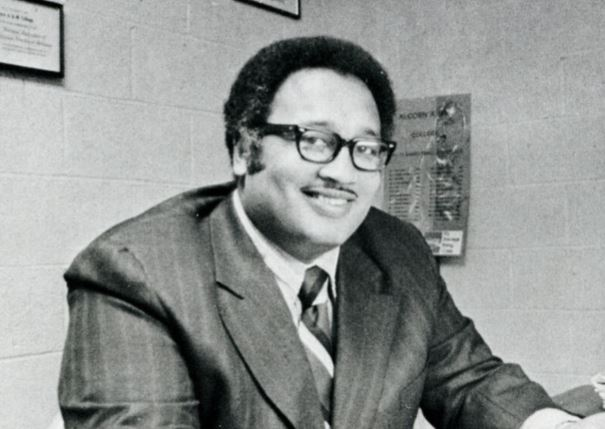
- Casem in 1974

Biographical details
- Born: June 23, 1934; Memphis, Tennessee, U.S.
- Died: April 25, 2020 (aged 85); Baton Rouge, Louisiana, U.S.
- Education: Xavier University of Louisiana

Coaching career (HC unless noted)
- 1959: Alcorn A&M (assistant)
- 1963: Alabama State
- 1964–1985: Alcorn A&M/State
- 1987–1988: Southern
- 1992: Southern (interim HC)

Administrative career (AD unless noted)
- 1966–1986: Alcorn State
- 1986–1999: Southern

Head coaching record
- Overall: 159–93–8
- Bowls: 1–0
- Tournaments: 0–1 (NCAA D-I-AA playoffs)

Accomplishments and honors

Championships
- 4 black college national (1968–1969, 1974, 1984); 7 SWAC (1968–1970, 1974, 1976, 1979, 1984)
- College Football Hall of Fame; Inducted in 2003 (profile)

Marino H. "The Godfather" Casem (June 23, 1934 – April 25, 2020) was an American college football coach and athletics administrator. He served as the head football coach at Alabama State University (1963), Alcorn State University (1964–1985), and Southern University (1987–1988, 1992), compiling a career head coaching record of 159–93–8. Casem's Alcorn State Braves teams won four black college national championships and seven Southwestern Athletic Conference (SWAC) titles. Casem also served as the athletic director at Alcorn State from 1966 to 1986 and at Southern from 1986 to 1999. He was inducted into the College Football Hall of Fame in 2003.

== Biography ==
Casem was born in Memphis, Tennessee in 1934. A Catholic, he attended Xavier University of Louisiana, a historically black and Catholic university in New Orleans.

Casem became the head football coach at Alabama State University in 1963 and compiled a record there of 2–8. In 1964, Casem was hired as the head football coach at Alcorn State University, a historically black college located in Lorman, Mississippi. He served as the head football coach for 22 years from 1964 to 1985. He was also Alcorn State's athletic director from 1966 to 1986. During Casem's tenure, Alcorn State won seven Southwestern Athletic Conference (SWAC) football championships and four black college football national championships. In 1984, Casem led Alcorn State to a perfect 9–0 regular season. The team was ranked No. 1 in the final NCAA Division I-AA poll, the first time a black college had ever finished the regular football season in that position. Casem compiled a record of 138–71–8 (86–48–7 in the SWAC), making him the all-time winningest coach in Alcorn State history. As Alcorn State's athletic director, Casem also oversaw 13 regular season men's basketball titles and three regular season women's basketball championships. In 1979, Alcorn State's men's basketball team became the first historically black university to capture a win in the National Invitational Tournament. He also led the effort to build the Davey L. Whitney Arena, and was instrumental in the design and planning of the school's football stadium.

In 1986, Casem resigned from Alcorn State to become the athletic director at Southern University, a historically black college located in Baton Rouge, Louisiana. He was also the head football coach in 1987 and 1988 and interim coach in 1992. In his three years as football coach, his teams compiled a 19–14 record (12–9 in the SWAC). He served as Southern's athletic director for 13 years from 1986 to 1999. During Casem's tenure, Southern won six of the first seven SWAC Commissioner's Cup awards, given to the most accomplished institution in the conference. In April 1999, Casem announced he would resign at the end of June 1999 at age 65.

Casem also served for many years on the NCAA's Football Rules Committee and Executive Committee. He was inducted into the College Football Hall of Fame in 2003. He has also been inducted into the SWAC Hall of Fame, Alcorn State Hall of Honor, and Mississippi Sports Hall of Fame, and has received the National Football Foundation Outstanding Contribution to Amateur Football Award and the Football Writers Association Citation of Honor. Casem is credited with saying, "On the East Coast, football is a cultural experience. In the Midwest, it's a form of cannibalism. On the West Coast, it's a tourist attraction. And in the South, football is a religion, and Saturday is the holy day."

In 1999, he also received the 28th NACDA/NIT Athletics Directors Award for his contribution to the sport of basketball and the National Invitational Tournament. On receiving the award, Casem said, "That you have seen fit to recognize me with this most hallowed award is, in essence, not just a tribute to me, but a tribute to all of the historically black colleges and universities, the many talented student-athletes, the outstanding coaches, motivated staff members, distinguished administrators and supportive fans who stood in our corner."

Casem died April 25, 2020.

== Head coaching record ==
Year	Team	Overall	Conference	Standing	Bowl/playoffs	NCAA^{#}
Alabama State Hornets (Southern Intercollegiate Athletic Conference) (1963)
1963	Alabama State	2–8				
Alabama State:		2–8				
Alcorn A&M/State Braves (Southwestern Athletic Conference) (1964–1985)
1964	Alcorn A&M	5–5	3–4	T–4th		
1965	Alcorn A&M	3–5–1	2–4–1	7th		
1966	Alcorn A&M	5–3–2	2–3–2	7th		
1967	Alcorn A&M	4–5	3–4	T–5th		
1968	Alcorn A&M	9–1	6–1	T–1st	W Orange Blossom Classic	
1969	Alcorn A&M	8–0–1	6–0–1	1st		
1970	Alcorn A&M	8–1	6–0	1st		
1971	Alcorn A&M	6–3	4–2	3rd		
1972	Alcorn A&M	5–3–1	4–1–1	3rd		
1973	Alcorn A&M	7–2–1	3–2–1	3rd		
1974	Alcorn State	9–2	5–1	T–1st		
1975	Alcorn State	6–3–1	3–3	T–4th		
1976	Alcorn State	8–2	5–1	1st		
1977	Alcorn State	3–8	2–4	T–4th		
1978	Alcorn State	5–4–1	2–3–1	4th		
1979	Alcorn State	8–2	5–1	T–1st		6
1980	Alcorn State	6–4	3–3	T–3rd		
1981	Alcorn State	5–5	3–3	4th		
1982	Alcorn State	5–6	3–3	4th		
1983	Alcorn State	7–3	4–3	5th		
1984	Alcorn State	9–1	7–0	1st	L NCAA Division I-AA Quarterfinal	1
1985	Alcorn State	7–3	5–2	3rd		20
Alcorn A&M/State:		138–71–8	86–48–7			
Southern Jaguars (Southwestern Athletic Conference) (1987–1988)
1987	Southern	7–4	5–2	T–2nd		
1988	Southern	7–4	4–3	T–3rd		
Southern Jaguars (Southwestern Athletic Conference) (1992)
1992	Southern	5–6	3–4	T–4th		
Southern:		19–14	12–9			
Total:		159–93–8				
National championship Conference title Conference division title or championship game berth
