= 1978 Morehead State Eagles football team =

American college football season

1978 Morehead State Eagles football
- Conference: Ohio Valley Conference
- Record: 2–6–1 (1–5 OVC)
- Head coach: Wayne Chapman (3rd season)
- Home stadium: Jayne Stadium

1978 Ohio Valley Conference football standings
	Conf.					Overall
Team	W		L		T	W		L		T
No. T–4 Western Kentucky $	7	–	0	–	0	8	–	2	–	0
No. 8 Eastern Kentucky	6	–	1	–	0	8	–	2	–	0
Tennessee Tech	4	–	3	–	0	5	–	6	–	0
Austin Peay	4	–	3	–	0	6	–	4	–	0
Murray State	2	–	5	–	0	4	–	7	–	0
Morehead State	2	–	5	–	0	2	–	6	–	1
Middle Tennessee	1	–	6	–	0	1	–	9	–	1
$ – Conference champion; Rankings from Associated Press poll

The 1978 Morehead State Eagles football team was an American football team that represented Morehead State University as a member of the Ohio Valley Conference (OVC) during the 1978 NCAA Division I-AA football season. In their third year under head coach Wayne Chapman, the Eagles compiled a 2–6–1 record (1–5 against conference opponents), finished in a three-way tie for five place in the OVC, and were outscored by a total of 206 to 145. The team played its home games at Jayne Stadium in Morehead, Kentucky.

On November 7, 1978, Chapman announced that he was resigning as the school's head football coach, effective at the end of the season. In three years as Morehead's head coach, Chapman compiled a 6–21–3 record. In December 1978, Morehead announced the hiring of Tom Lichtenberg to replace Chapman.

== Schedule ==
Date	Opponent	Site	Result	Attendance	Source
September 16	Kentucky State*	Jayne Stadium; Morehead, KY	T 7–7	6,500	
September 23	at Middle Tennessee	Horace Jones Field; Murfreesboro, TN	L 6–9		
September 30	Murray State	Jayne Stadium; Morehead, KY	W 49–32	6,000	
October 7	at Austin Peay	Municipal Stadium; Clarksville, TN	L 16–19		
October 14	at Tennessee–Martin*	Graham Stadium; Martin, TN	L 9–23		
October 21	Tennessee Tech	Jayne Stadium; Morehead, KY	L 20–21		
October 28	No. 8 Western Kentucky	Jayne Stadium; Morehead, KY	L 7–35	9,000	
November 4	at East Tennessee State	Memorial Center; Johnson City, TN	W 31–30		
November 18	at No. 8 Eastern Kentucky	Hanger Field; Richmond, KY (rivalry)	L 0–30	9,500	
*Non-conference game; Rankings from Associated Press Poll released prior to the game
