= 1978 Tennessee Tech Golden Eagles football team =

American college football season

1978 Tennessee Tech Golden Eagles football
- Conference: Ohio Valley Conference
- Record: 5–6 (4–3 OVC)
- Head coach: Don Wade (11th season)
- Home stadium: Tucker Stadium

1978 Ohio Valley Conference football standings
	Conf.					Overall
Team	W		L		T	W		L		T
No. T–4 Western Kentucky $	7	–	0	–	0	8	–	2	–	0
No. 8 Eastern Kentucky	6	–	1	–	0	8	–	2	–	0
Tennessee Tech	4	–	3	–	0	5	–	6	–	0
Austin Peay	4	–	3	–	0	6	–	4	–	0
Murray State	2	–	5	–	0	4	–	7	–	0
Morehead State	2	–	5	–	0	2	–	6	–	1
Middle Tennessee	1	–	6	–	0	1	–	9	–	1
$ – Conference champion; Rankings from Associated Press poll

The 1978 Tennessee Tech Golden Eagles football team represented Tennessee Technological University (commonly referred to as Tennessee Tech) as a member of the Ohio Valley Conference (OVC) during the 1978 NCAA Division I-AA football season. Led by 11th-year head coach Don Wade, the Golden Eagles compiled an overall record of 5–6, with a mark of 4–3 in conference play, and finished tied for third in the OVC.

== Schedule ==
Date	Opponent	Site	Result	Attendance	Source
September 2	at Nicholls State*	John L. Guidry Stadium; Thibodaux, LA	L 10–20	6,900	
September 9	Western Carolina*	Tucker Stadium; Cookeville, TN	W 22–20		
September 23	Murray State	Tucker Stadium; Cookeville, TN	W 24–14	14,500	
September 30	at Cameron*	Cameron Stadium; Lawton, OK	L 10–21		
October 7	at East Tennessee State	Memorial Center; Johnson City, TN	L 17–38	4,866	
October 14	Western Kentucky	Tucker Stadium; Cookeville, TN	L 20–26	16,000	
October 21	at Morehead State	Jayne Stadium; Morehead, KY	W 21–20		
October 28	at Troy State*	Veterans Memorial Stadium; Troy, AL	L 0–45	6,850	
November 4	No. 9 Eastern Kentucky	Tucker Stadium; Cookeville, TN	L 16–20	5,000	
November 11	at Austin Peay	Municipal Stadium; Clarksville, TN	W 28–14	4,500	
November 18	Middle Tennessee	Tucker Stadium; Cookeville, TN	W 35–10		
*Non-conference game; Rankings from Associated Press Poll released prior to the game
