= 1978 North Carolina A&T Aggies football team =

American college football season

1978 North Carolina A&T Aggies football

Gold Bowl, L 6–21 at Virginia Union
- Conference: Mid-Eastern Athletic Conference
- Record: 6–6 (4–2 MEAC)
- Head coach: James McKinley (2nd season)
- Home stadium: World War Memorial Stadium

1978 Mid-Eastern Athletic Conference football standings
	Conf.					Overall
Team	W		L		T	W		L		T
No. 6 South Carolina State $	5	–	0	–	1	8	–	2	–	1
North Carolina A&T	4	–	2	–	0	6	–	6	–	0
Delaware State	3	–	3	–	0	3	–	7	–	0
Morgan State	2	–	3	–	1	4	–	6	–	1
Howard	2	–	4	–	0	4	–	6	–	0
Maryland Eastern Shore	2	–	4	–	0	3	–	8	–	0
North Carolina Central	2	–	4	–	0	3	–	8	–	0
$ – Conference champion; The conference was a hybrid of NCAA Division I-AA and Division II programs. Morgan State, Maryland-Eastern Shore, and North Carolina Central were classified as NCAA Division II. All the other teams were Division I-AA.; Rankings from Associated Press poll

The 1978 North Carolina A&T Aggies football team represented North Carolina A&T State University as member of the Mid-Eastern Athletic Conference (MEAC) during the 1978 NCAA Division I-AA football season. Led by second-year head coach James McKinley, the Aggies compiled and overall record of 6–6 with a mark of 4–2 in conference play, placing second in the MEAC. North Carolina A&T concluded the season with a loss to Virginia Union in the Gold Bowl.

== Schedule ==
Date	Opponent	Site	Result	Attendance	Source
September 2	at Winston-Salem State*	Groves Stadium; Winston-Salem, NC (rivalry)	L 7–25	22,500	
September 9	Maryland Eastern Shore	World War Memorial Stadium; Greensboro, NC	W 23–7	5,000	
September 16	South Carolina State	World War Memorial Stadium; Greensboro, NC (rivalry)	L 7–34	20,000	
September 23	Bethune–Cookman*	World War Memorial Stadium; Greensboro, NC	L 12–16		
September 30	at Johnson C. Smith*	American Legion Memorial Stadium; Charlotte, NC	W 24–0		
October 7	Norfolk State*	World War Memorial Stadium; Greensboro, NC	W 39–28		
October 14	at Delaware*	Delaware Stadium; Newark, DE	L 0–26	19,304	
October 21	at Howard	RFK Stadium; Washington, DC	W 28–16		
October 28	Morgan State	World War Memorial Stadium; Greensboro, NC	W 25–0		
November 11	Delaware State	World War Memorial Stadium; Greensboro, NC	L 6–9		
November 18	at North Carolina Central	Wallace Wade Stadium; Durham, NC (rivalry)	W 17–13	18,000	
December 2	at Virginia Union*	Hovey Field; Richmond, VA (Gold Bowl)	L 6–21	7,500	
*Non-conference game

== Roster ==
1978 North Carolina A&T Aggies football team roster
Players
Coaches
Offense

Pos.	#	Name	Class

Defense

Pos.	#	Name	Class
DE		Dwaine Board	Sr
LB		George Small	Sr

Special teams

Pos.	#	Name	Class

Head coach

- James McKinley

Coordinators/assistant coaches

Legend

- (C) Team captain
- (S) Suspended
- (I) Ineligible
- Injured
- Redshirt
