= 1978 NCAA Division I-AA Football Championship Game =

Postseason college football game

1978 NCAA Division I-AA Football Championship
- I-AA National Championship Game; Pioneer Bowl
Florida A&M Rattlers	UMass Minutemen
(11–1)	(9–3)
SIAC	Yankee Conference
35	28
Head coach: Rudy Hubbard	Head coach: Bob Pickett
AP 3	AP 4 (tie)
	1	2	3	4	Total
Florida A&M	0	14	7	14	35
UMass	3	3	9	13	28
- Date: December 16, 1978
- Season: 1978
- Stadium: Memorial Stadium
- Location: Wichita Falls, Texas
- Attendance: 13,604

United States TV coverage
- Network: ABC Sports
- Announcers: Bill Flemming (play-by-play), Frank Broyles (color)

The 1978 NCAA Division I-AA Football Championship Game was a postseason college football game between the Florida A&M Rattlers and the UMass Minutemen. The game was played on December 16, 1978, at Memorial Stadium in Wichita Falls, Texas. The culminating game of the 1978 NCAA Division I-AA football season, it was won by Florida A&M, 35–28.

This was the first season of I-AA play, and the first championship game for the newly formed division. The game was also known as the Pioneer Bowl, a name that had been used starting in 1971 for various NCAA playoff games held in Wichita Falls.

== Teams ==
The participants of the Championship Game were the finalists of the 1978 I-AA Playoffs, which began with a four-team bracket.

=== Florida A&M Rattlers ===
In 1978, Florida A&M was a member of the Southern Intercollegiate Athletic Conference (SIAC), a Division II conference. The university had successfully petitioned the NCAA for Division I classification (Division I-AA in football), which took effect on September 1, 1978.

Florida A&M finished their regular season with a 9–1 record; their only loss was to Tennessee State. Ranked third in the final AP Poll for I-AA, and then having defeated Grambling State in the Orange Blossom Classic played on December 2, the Rattlers were the at-large selection to the four-team playoff. They defeated Jackson State, the South selection, by a score of 15–10 to reach the final.

=== UMass Minutemen ===
UMass finished their regular season with an 8–3 record (5–0 in conference)—all of their losses were to Division I-A programs; Villanova, Harvard, and Rutgers. Tied with Western Kentucky for fourth in the final AP Poll for I-AA, the Minutemen were the East selection to the playoff. They defeated Nevada, the West selection, by a 44–21 score to reach the final.

== Game summary ==
The game was played in a strong wind, estimated at 20–25 miles per hour (32–40 km/h). It was a factor, especially with Florida A&M, as Sammy Knight punted six times for only 45 total yards; he also had two punts blocked. UMass led early, going ahead 6–0 on two field goals. Florida A&M held a 14–6 lead at halftime, but trailed twice in the second half, as UMass had leads of 15–14 and 22–21. Two fourth quarter touchdowns by fullback Mike Solomon then provided Florida A&M with the winning margin. Florida A&M won without completing a pass from scrimmage, as quarterback Albert Chester went 0-for-7 with two interceptions; he did successfully pass for a two-point conversion, and ran for two touchdowns.

Florida A&M placekicker Vince Coleman, who was 3-for-3 on extra points, would go on to play 13 seasons in Major League Baseball, most notably with the St. Louis Cardinals.

Note: contemporary news reports listed attendance as 14,000 (estimated); NCAA records indicate 13,604.

=== Scoring summary ===
Scoring summary

Quarter	Time	Drive			Team	Scoring information	Score	
Quarter	Time	Plays	Yards	TOP	Team	Scoring information	FAMU	MASS
1	10:18	9	40		MASS	20-yard field goal by Sandro Vitiello	0	3
2	10:14	4	(-2)		MASS	20-yard field goal by Vitiello	0	6
2	8:30		55		FAMU	Albert Chester 1-yard touchdown run, Vince Coleman kick good	7	6
2	4:22		49		FAMU	Chester 4-yard touchdown run, Coleman kick good	14	6
3	6:54	3	8		MASS	Cliff Pedro 1-yard touchdown run, 2-point pass incomplete	14	12
3	1:57		37		MASS	29-yard field goal by Vitiello	14	15
3		2	71		FAMU	Mike Solomon 65-yard touchdown run, Coleman kick good	21	15
4	12:56	3	13		MASS	Pedro 9-yard touchdown reception from Mike McEvilly, Vitiello kick good	21	22
4	8:14	1	28		FAMU	Solomon 28-yard touchdown run, 2-point pass good (Emanuel White from Chester)	29	22
4	3:15	8	55		FAMU	Solomon 20-yard touchdown run, 2-point pass failed	35	22
4	0:00				MASS	Chris Kurtz 34-yard touchdown reception from McEvilly, 2-point pass failed	35	28
"TOP" = time of possession. For other American football terms, see Glossary of American football.							35	28

=== Game statistics ===
	1	2	3	4	Total
Rattlers	0	14	7	14	35
Minutemen	3	3	9	13	28

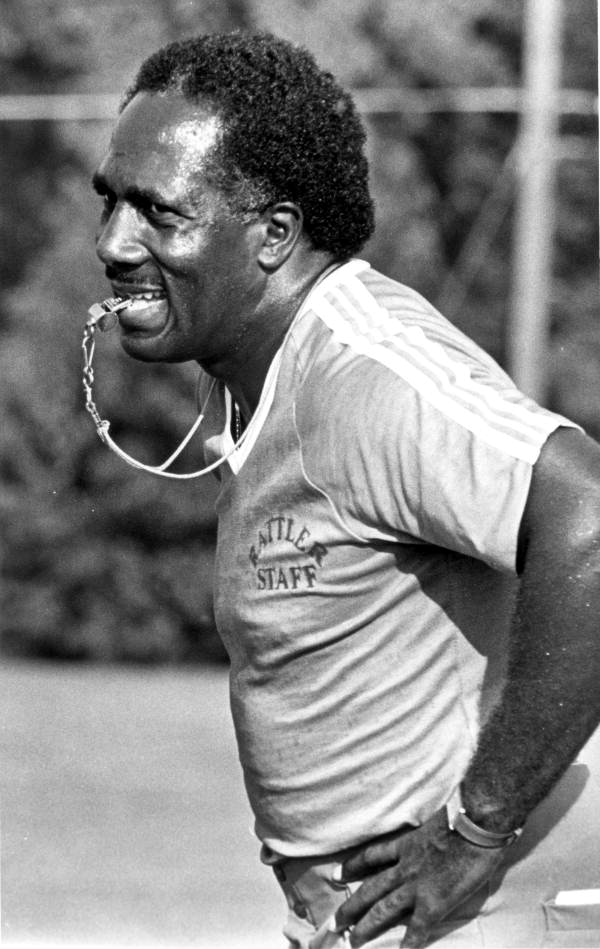
Florida A&M head coach Rudy Hubbard

Statistics	FAMU	MASS
First downs	20	11
Plays–yards	83–470	69–241
Rushes–yards	76–470	45–116
Passing yards	0	125
Passing: comp–att–int	0–7–2	8–24–1
Time of possession		

Team	Category	Player	Statistics
Florida A&M	Passing	Albert Chester	0–7, 2 INT
Florida A&M	Rushing	Mike Solomon	27 car, 207 yds, 3 TD
Florida A&M	Receiving	none	—
UMass	Passing	Mike McEvilly	8–24, 125 yds, 2 TD 1 INT
UMass	Rushing	Hank Sareault	16 car, 71 yds
UMass	Receiving	Chris Kurtz	2 rec, 46 yds, 1 TD

== See also ==
- 1978 NCAA Division I-AA football rankings
