= 1978 Murray State Racers football team =

American college football season

1978 Murray State Racers football
- Conference: Ohio Valley Conference
- Record: 4–7 (2–5 OVC)
- Head coach: Mike Gottfried (1st season)
- Home stadium: Roy Stewart Stadium

1978 Ohio Valley Conference football standings
| | Conf. | | | | | Overall |
| Team | W | | L | | T | W | | L | | T |
|---|---|---|---|---|---|---|---|---|---|---|
| No. T–4 Western Kentucky $ | 7 | – | 0 | – | 0 | 8 | – | 2 | – | 0 |
| No. 8 Eastern Kentucky | 6 | – | 1 | – | 0 | 8 | – | 2 | – | 0 |
| Tennessee Tech | 4 | – | 3 | – | 0 | 5 | – | 6 | – | 0 |
| Austin Peay | 4 | – | 3 | – | 0 | 6 | – | 4 | – | 0 |
| Murray State | 2 | – | 5 | – | 0 | 4 | – | 7 | – | 0 |
| Morehead State | 2 | – | 5 | – | 0 | 2 | – | 6 | – | 1 |
| Middle Tennessee | 1 | – | 6 | – | 0 | 1 | – | 9 | – | 1 |
$ – Conference champion; Rankings from Associated Press poll

The 1978 Murray State Racers football team represented Murray State University as a member of the Ohio Valley Conference (OVC) during the 1978 NCAA Division I-AA football season. Led by first-year head coach Mike Gottfried, the Racers compiled an overall record of 4–7, with a mark of 2–5 in conference play, and finished tied for fifth in the OVC.

== Schedule ==
| Date | Opponent | Site | Result | Attendance | Source |
|---|---|---|---|---|---|
| September 2 | Southeast Missouri State* | Roy Stewart Stadium; Murray, KY | L 21–24 | | |
| September 9 | Evansville* | Roy Stewart Stadium; Murray, KY | W 23–9 | | |
| September 23 | at Tennessee Tech | Tucker Stadium; Cookeville, TN | L 14–24 | 14,500 | |
| September 30 | at Morehead State | Jayne Stadium; Morehead, KY | L 32–49 | 6,000 | |
| October 7 | Tennessee–Martin* | Roy Stewart Stadium; Murray, KY | W 21–7 | | |
| October 14 | Middle Tennessee | Roy Stewart Stadium; Murray, KY | W 33–7 | 6,000 | |
| October 21 | East Tennessee State | Roy Stewart Stadium; Murray, KY | W 34–21 | | |
| October 28 | at No. T–9 Eastern Kentucky | Hanger Field; Richmond, KY | L 21–24 | | |
| November 4 | at Austin Peay | Municipal Stadium; Clarksville, TN | L 17–23 | 8,000 | |
| November 11 | at No. 7 Eastern Illinois* | O'Brien Stadium; Charleston, IL | L 14–35 | 6,500 | |
| November 18 | No. 4 Western Kentucky | Roy Stewart Stadium; Murray, KY (rivalry) | L 6–14 | 9,500 | |
*Non-conference game; Rankings from Associated Press Poll released prior to the game
