= 1978 Texas Southern Tigers football team =

American college football season

1978 Texas Southern Tigers football
- Conference: Southwestern Athletic Conference
- Record: 3–7–1 (1–4–1 SWAC)
- Head coach: Wendell Mosley (3rd season)
- Home stadium: Astrodome

1978 Southwestern Athletic Conference football standings
	Conf.					Overall
Team	W		L		T	W		L		T
Grambling State $	5	–	0	–	1	9	–	1	–	1
No. 2 Jackson State ^	5	–	1	–	0	10	–	2	–	0
Mississippi Valley State	3	–	2	–	1	6	–	3	–	1
Alcorn State	2	–	3	–	1	5	–	4	–	1
Southern	2	–	4	–	0	4	–	7	–	0
Texas Southern	1	–	4	–	1	3	–	7	–	1
Prairie View A&M	1	–	5	–	0	3	–	7	–	0
$ – Conference champion; ^ – NCAA Division I-AA playoff participant; The conference was a hybrid of NCAA Division I-AA and II programs. Mississippi Valley State and Prairie View were classified as NCAA Division II for the 1978 season. All the other teams were Division I-AA.; Rankings from Associated Press poll

The 1978 Texas Southern Tigers football team was an American football team that represented Texas Southern University as a member of the Southwestern Athletic Conference (SWAC) during the 1978 NCAA Division I-AA football season. Led by third-year head coach Wendell Mosley, the Tigers compiled an overall record of 3–7–1, with a mark of 1–4–1 in conference play, and finished sixth in the SWAC. They were outscored by a total of 214 to 131.

Three Texas Southern players were selected to the first team of the District 8 all-star team: John McNeal; Alvin Whittington; and LeRoy Paul.

== Schedule ==
Date	Opponent	Site	Result	Attendance	Source
September 9	vs. Bethune–Cookman*	Gator Bowl Stadium; Jacksonville, FL	L 13–14		
September 16	Southern	Astrodome; Houston, TX	W 20–11		
September 23	Tennessee State*	Astrodome; Houston, TX	W 16–0		
September 30	at Texas A&I*	Javelina Stadium; Kingsville, TX	L 0–28		
October 7	at Alcorn State	Henderson Stadium; Lorman, MS	T 10–10		
October 14	Bishop*	Astrodome; Houston, TX	W 37–17		
October 21	Mississippi Valley State	Astrodome; Houston, TX	L 7–38	3,580	
October 28	Grambling State	Astrodome; Houston, TX	L 16–22		
November 4	at No. 2 Jackson State	Mississippi Veterans Memorial Stadium; Jackson, MS	L 0–41		
November 11	at Langston*	Langston, OK	L 6–13		
November 18	Prairie View A&M	Astrodome; Houston, TX (rivalry)	L 6–20		
*Non-conference game; Rankings from Associated Press Poll released prior to the game
