= 1978 Alcorn State Braves football team =

American college football season

1978 Alcorn State Braves football
- Conference: Southwestern Athletic Conference
- Record: 5–4–1 (2–3–1 SWAC)
- Head coach: Marino Casem (15th season)
- Home stadium: Henderson Stadium; Mississippi Veterans Memorial Stadium

1978 Southwestern Athletic Conference football standings
	Conf.					Overall
Team	W		L		T	W		L		T
Grambling State $	5	–	0	–	1	9	–	1	–	1
No. 2 Jackson State ^	5	–	1	–	0	10	–	2	–	0
Mississippi Valley State	3	–	2	–	1	6	–	3	–	1
Alcorn State	2	–	3	–	1	5	–	4	–	1
Southern	2	–	4	–	0	4	–	7	–	0
Texas Southern	1	–	4	–	1	3	–	7	–	1
Prairie View A&M	1	–	5	–	0	3	–	7	–	0
$ – Conference champion; ^ – NCAA Division I-AA playoff participant; The conference was a hybrid of NCAA Division I-AA and II programs. Mississippi Valley State and Prairie View were classified as NCAA Division II for the 1978 season. All the other teams were Division I-AA.; Rankings from Associated Press poll

The 1978 Alcorn State Braves football team represented Alcorn State University as a member of the Southwestern Athletic Conference (SWAC) during the 1978 NCAA Division I-AA football season. Led by 15th-year head coach Marino Casem, the Braves compiled an overall record of 5–4–1, with a conference record of 2–3–1, and finished fourth in the SWAC.

== Schedule ==
Date	Opponent	Site	Result	Attendance	Source
September 9	vs. Grambling State	State Fair Stadium; Shreveport, LA	L 13–21		
September 16	vs. Alabama State*	Ladd Stadium; Mobile, AL	W 16–12		
September 23	Central Michigan*	Mississippi Veterans Memorial Stadium; Jackson, MS	W 24–16		
September 30	at South Carolina State*	State College Stadium; Orangeburg, SC	L 0–16		
October 7	Texas Southern	Henderson Stadium; Lorman, MS	T 10–10		
October 21	Southern	Mississippi Veterans Memorial Stadium; Jackson, MS	W 16–7		
October 28	Bishop*	Henderson Stadium; Lorman, MS	W 36–7		
November 4	at Mississippi Valley State	Magnolia Stadium; Itta Bena, MS	L 7–15	6,012	
November 11	at Prairie View A&M	Edward L. Blackshear Field; Prairie View, TX	W 28–7		
November 18	No. 2 Jackson State	Henderson Stadium; Lorman, MS (rivalry)	L 8–38		
*Non-conference game; Rankings from AP Poll released prior to the game
