= Rick Taylor (American football) =

American football coach and administrator (born 1941)

Biographical details
- Born: September 16, 1941 (age 85); Camp Hill, Pennsylvania, U.S.

Coaching career (HC unless noted)
- 1966–1967: Hofstra (assistant)
- 1968–1970: Lehigh (assistant)
- 1971–1976: Dartmouth (assistant)
- 1977–1984: Boston University

Administrative career (AD unless noted)
- 1984–1988: Boston University
- 1988–1994: Cincinnati
- 1994–2003: Northwestern

Head coaching record
- Overall: 55–32–1
- Tournaments: 1–3 (NCAA D-I-AA playoffs)

Accomplishments and honors

Championships
- 4 Yankee Conference (1980, 1982–1984)

Charles F. "Rick" Taylor (born September 19, 1941) is an American former football coach and college athletics administrator. He was the most successful head coach in Boston University history after his stint from 1977 to 1984. He compiled an overall record of 55–32–1, including four Yankee Conference championships in a five-year span. Taylor also led the Terriers to at least eight wins on four occasions. Taylor retired from football after the 1984 season but remained the school's athletic director for four more years.

== Head coaching record ==
Year	Team	Overall	Conference	Standing	Bowl/playoffs
Boston University Terriers (Yankee Conference) (1977–1984)
1977	Boston University	3–7	1–4	T–4th	
1978	Boston University	6–4	2–3	4th	
1979	Boston University	8–1–1	4–1	T–1st	
1980	Boston University	9–2	5–0	1st	
1981	Boston University	6–5	3–2	3rd	
1982	Boston University	5–6	3–2	T–1st	L NCAA Division I-AA First Round
1983	Boston University	9–4	4–1	T–1st	L NCAA Division I-AA First Quarterfinal
1984	Boston University	9–3	4–1	T–1st	L NCAA Division I-AA First Round
Boston University:		55–32–1	26–14		
Total:		55–32–1			
National championship Conference title Conference division title or championship game berth
