= 1978 Middle Tennessee Blue Raiders football team =

American college football season

1978 Middle Tennessee Blue Raiders football
- Conference: Ohio Valley Conference
- Record: 1–9–1 (1–6 OVC)
- Head coach: Ben Hurt (4th season)
- Home stadium: Horace Jones Field

1978 Ohio Valley Conference football standings
	Conf.					Overall
Team	W		L		T	W		L		T
No. T–4 Western Kentucky $	7	–	0	–	0	8	–	2	–	0
No. 8 Eastern Kentucky	6	–	1	–	0	8	–	2	–	0
Tennessee Tech	4	–	3	–	0	5	–	6	–	0
Austin Peay	4	–	3	–	0	6	–	4	–	0
Murray State	2	–	5	–	0	4	–	7	–	0
Morehead State	2	–	5	–	0	2	–	6	–	1
Middle Tennessee	1	–	6	–	0	1	–	9	–	1
$ – Conference champion; Rankings from Associated Press poll

The 1978 Middle Tennessee Blue Raiders football team represented Middle Tennessee State University as a member of the Ohio Valley Conference (OVC) during the 1978 NCAA Division I-AA football season. Led by Ben Hurt in his fourth and final year as head coach, the Blue Raiders compiled an overall record of 1–9–1 with a mark of 1–6 in conference play, placing last out of eight teams in the OVC.

== Schedule ==
Date	Opponent	Site	Result	Attendance	Source
September 2	at Tennessee State*	Dudley Field; Nashville, TN	L 6–13		
September 16	Tennessee–Martin*	Horace Jones Field; Murfreesboro, TN	L 17–28		
September 23	Morehead State	Horace Jones Field; Murfreesboro, TN	W 9–6		
September 30	Chattanooga*	Horace Jones Field; Murfreesboro, TN	T 14–14	3,800	
October 7	at No. T–10 Eastern Kentucky	Hanger Field; Richmond, KY	L 12–42	8,700	
October 14	at Murray State	Roy Stewart Stadium; Murray, KY	L 7–33	6,000	
October 21	Delaware*	Horace Jones Field; Murfreesboro, TN	L 3–53	3,500	
October 28	Austin Peay	Horace Jones Field; Murfreesboro, TN	L 17–28		
November 4	at No. 7 Western Kentucky	L. T. Smith Stadium; Bowling Green, KY (rivalry)	L 0–54	19,500	
November 11	East Tennessee State	Horace Jones Field; Murfreesboro, TN	L 0–34		
November 18	at Tennessee Tech	Tucker Stadium; Cookeville, TN	L 10–35		
*Non-conference game; Rankings from Associated Press Poll released prior to the game
