= Cass Jackson =

American football player and coach

Playing career
- 1962–1963: San Jose State
- Position: Halfback

Coaching career (HC unless noted)
- 1968–1972: San Jose State (assistant)
- 1973–1974: Oberlin
- 1975–1977: Morris Brown
- 1978–1980: Southern

Head coaching record
- Overall: 38–39–2

Cass Jackson is an American former football coach and player. Hired in 1973 to become the head football coach at Oberlin College in Oberlin, Ohio, he became one of the first African-American head football coaches at a predominantly white college. Jackson later served as the head coach at Morris Brown College from 1975 to 1977 and at Southern University in Baton Rouge, Louisiana from 1978 to 1980. He played college football at San Jose State University, where he was a running back on the 1962 and 1963 teams.

== Head coaching record ==
Year	Team	Overall	Conference	Standing	Bowl/playoffs	AP^{#}
Oberlin Yeomen (Ohio Athletic Conference) (1973–1974)
1973	Oberlin	4–5	0–0	NA		
1974	Oberlin	5–4	0–0	NA		
Oberlin:		9–9				
Morris Brown Wolverines (Southern Intercollegiate Athletic Conference) (1975–1977)
1975	Morris Brown	3–6	0–5	7th (Division I)		
1976	Morris Brown	6–3–1	3–2	4th (Division I)		
1977	Morris Brown	5–4	2–3	T–3rd (Division I)		
Morris Brown:		14–13–1	5–10			
Southern Jaguars (Southwestern Athletic Conference) (1978–1980)
1978	Southern	4–7	2–4	5th		
1979	Southern	7–4	4–2	T–3rd		T–10
1980	Southern	4–6–1	3–3	T–3rd		
Southern:		15–17–2	9–9			
Total:		38–39–2				
