= Mike Gottfried =

American football coach and commentator (born 1944)

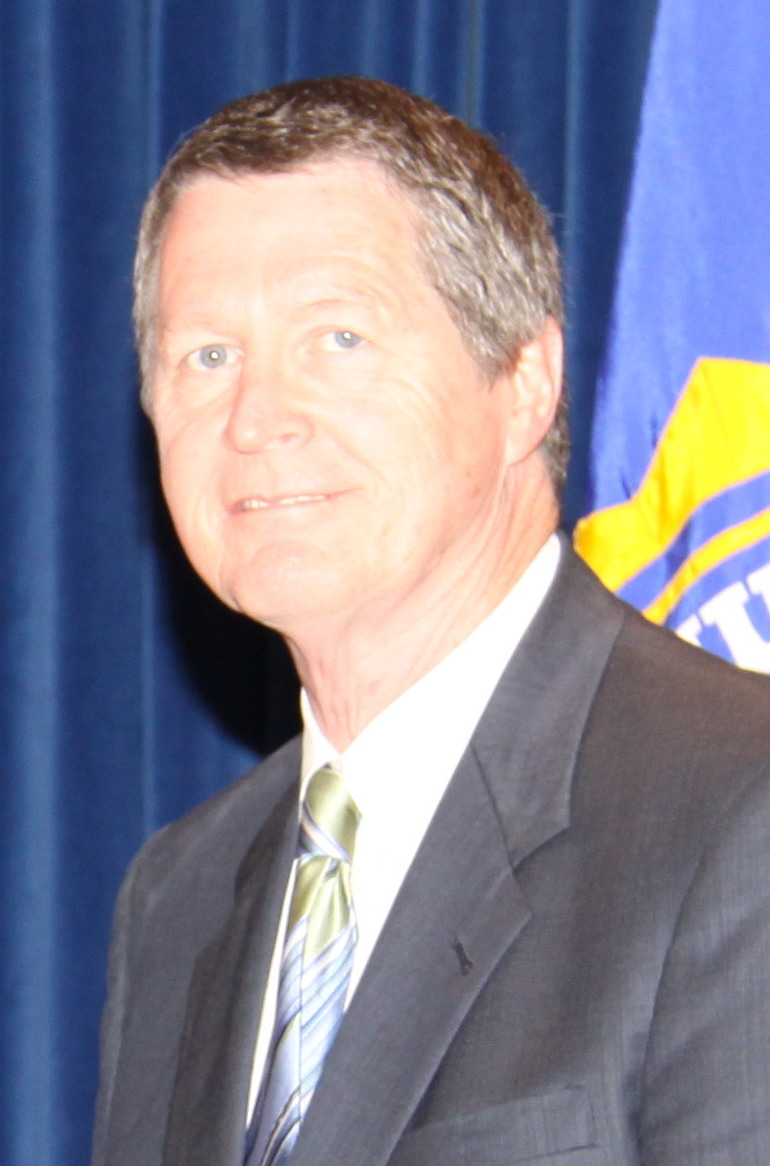
- Gottfried in 2010

Biographical details
- Born: December 17, 1944 (age 81); Crestline, Ohio, U.S.

Playing career
- 1962–1965: Morehead State
- Position: Quarterback

Coaching career (HC unless noted)
- c. 1970: St. Paul HS (OH)
- 1975–1976: Cincinnati (assoc. HC)
- 1977: Arizona (defensive backs)
- 1978–1980: Murray State
- 1981–1982: Cincinnati
- 1983–1985: Kansas
- 1986–1989: Pittsburgh

Head coaching record
- Overall: 76–55–4 (college); 50–19–1 (high school)
- Bowls: 0–1
- Tournaments: 0–1 (NCAA D-I-AA playoffs)

Accomplishments and honors

Awards
- Big Eight Coach of the Year (1984); OVC Coach of the Year (1968)

Mike Gottfried (born December 17, 1944) is an American sportscaster and former college football player and coach. He served as the head football coach at Murray State University (1978–1980), the University of Cincinnati (1981–1982), the University of Kansas (1983–1985), and the University of Pittsburgh (1986–1989), compiling a career college football record of 76–55–4. Gottfried played college football at Morehead State University as a quarterback from 1962 to 1965. Before moving to the college coaching ranks, he coached high school football in Ohio, tallying a mark of 50–19–1. Gottfried is the uncle of Mark Gottfried, the former head men's basketball coach at Cal State Northridge.

After coaching, Gottfried served as a college football color analyst and color commentator for ESPN from 1990 until 2007.

Gottfried's autobiography, entitled Coach's Challenge: Faith, Football, and Filling the Father Gap and co-written by Ron Benson, was released on September 11, 2007. Gottfried and his wife, Mickey, founded Team Focus in 2000, a cost-free community outreach program aimed at young men without fathers. Gottfried felt drawn to start Team Focus, because he lost his father at age 11 and understood the difficulties and hardships of young men growing up without fathers.

== Head coaching record ==
=== College ===
Year	Team	Overall	Conference	Standing	Bowl/playoffs	Coaches^{#}	AP^{°}
Murray State Racers (Ohio Valley Conference) (1978–1980)
1978	Murray State	4–7	1–5	T–5th			
1979	Murray State	9–2–1	6–0	1st	L NCAA Division I-AA Semifinal		
1980	Murray State	9–2	5–2	T–2nd			
Murray State:		22–11–1	12–7				
Cincinnati Bearcats (NCAA Division I-A independent) (1981–1982)
1981	Cincinnati	6–5					
1982	Cincinnati	6–5					
Cincinnati:		12–10					
Kansas Jayhawks (Big Eight Conference) (1983–1985)
1983	Kansas	4–6–1	2–5	T–6th			
1984	Kansas	5–6	4–3	4th			
1985	Kansas	6–6	2–5	6th			
Kansas:		15–18–1	8–13				
Pittsburgh Panthers (NCAA Division I-A independent) (1986–1989)
1986	Pittsburgh	6–4–1					
1987	Pittsburgh	8–4			L Astro-Bluebonnet		
1988	Pittsburgh	6–5					
1989	Pittsburgh	7–3–1 (Note: Paul Hackett coached Pittsburgh in the John Hancock Bowl.)			John Hancock	19	17
Pittsburgh:		27–16–2					
Total:		76–55–4					
National championship Conference title Conference division title or championship game berth
^{#}Rankings from final Coaches Poll.; ^{°}Rankings from final AP Poll.
