= Wendell Mosley =

American football player and coach (1932-1989)

Biographical details
- Born: 1932
- Died: December 31, 1989 (aged 57); Dallas, Texas, U.S.
- Education: Texas Southern

Coaching career (HC unless noted)
- 1972–1975: Oklahoma (assistant)
- 1976–1978: Texas Southern
- 1979–1981: Oklahoma (assistant)
- 1983: Northwest Classen HS (OK)

Head coaching record
- Overall: 11–20–2 (college)

Wendell Mosley (1932 – December 31, 1989) was an American football player and coach. He served as the head football coach at Texas Southern University from 1976 to 1978, compiling a record of 11–20–2.

== Head coaching record ==
Year	Team	Overall	Conference	Standing
Texas Southern Tigers (Southwestern Athletic Conference) (1976–1978)
1976	Texas Southern	2–9	1–5	T–6th
1977	Texas Southern	6–4–1	3–2–1	3rd
1978	Texas Southern	3–7–1	1–4–1	6th
Texas Southern:		11–20–2	5–11–2	
Total:		11–20–2		
