= 1978 Howard Bison football team =

American college football season

1978 Howard Bison football
- Conference: Mid-Eastern Athletic Conference
- Record: 4–6 (2–4 MEAC)
- Head coach: Doug Porter (5th season)
- Home stadium: Howard Stadium; RFK Stadium

1978 Mid-Eastern Athletic Conference football standings
	Conf.					Overall
Team	W		L		T	W		L		T
No. 6 South Carolina State $	5	–	0	–	1	8	–	2	–	1
North Carolina A&T	4	–	2	–	0	6	–	6	–	0
Delaware State	3	–	3	–	0	3	–	7	–	0
Morgan State	2	–	3	–	1	4	–	6	–	1
Howard	2	–	4	–	0	4	–	6	–	0
Maryland Eastern Shore	2	–	4	–	0	3	–	8	–	0
North Carolina Central	2	–	4	–	0	3	–	8	–	0
$ – Conference champion; The conference was a hybrid of NCAA Division I-AA and Division II programs. Morgan State, Maryland-Eastern Shore, and North Carolina Central were classified as NCAA Division II. All the other teams were Division I-AA.; Rankings from Associated Press poll

The 1978 Howard Bison football team represented Howard University as a member of the Mid-Eastern Athletic Conference (MEAC) during the 1978 NCAA Division I-AA football season. Led by fifth-year head coach Doug Porter, the Bison compiled an overall record of 4–6, with a mark of 2–4 in conference play, and finished tied for fifth in the MEAC.

== Schedule ==
Date	Opponent	Site	Result	Attendance	Source
September 16	at Maryland Eastern Shore	Princess Anne, MD	L 21–23	2,000	
September 23	vs. No. T–1 South Carolina State	Giants Stadium; East Rutherford, NJ	L 0–27	17,139	
September 30	at No. 7 Florida A&M*	Bragg Memorial Stadium; Tallahassee, FL	L 7–28	11,882	
October 7	Delaware State	Howard Stadium; Washington, DC	W 37–6		
October 14	at Virginia State*	Rogers Stadium; Ettrick, VA	W 27–20	12,000	
October 21	North Carolina A&T^{†}	RFK Stadium; Washington, DC	L 16–28		
October 28	at Hampton*	Armstrong Stadium; Hampton, VA (rivalry)	W 17–6	1,630	
November 4	at Southern*	BREC Memorial Stadium; Baton Rouge, LA	L 20–28		
November 11	North Carolina Central	Howard Stadium; Washington, DC	W 24–17		
November 18	Morgan State	Howard Stadium; Washington, DC (rivalry)	L 9–10	2,000	
*Non-conference game; ^{†}Homecoming; Rankings from AP Poll released prior to the game
