= 1978 Delaware State Hornets football team =

American college football season

1978 Delaware State Hornets football
- Conference: Mid-Eastern Athletic Conference
- Record: 3–7 (3–3 MEAC)
- Head coach: Ed Wyche (4th season)
- Home stadium: Alumni Stadium

1978 Mid-Eastern Athletic Conference football standings
	Conf.					Overall
Team	W		L		T	W		L		T
No. 6 South Carolina State $	5	–	0	–	1	8	–	2	–	1
North Carolina A&T	4	–	2	–	0	6	–	6	–	0
Delaware State	3	–	3	–	0	3	–	7	–	0
Morgan State	2	–	3	–	1	4	–	6	–	1
Howard	2	–	4	–	0	4	–	6	–	0
Maryland Eastern Shore	2	–	4	–	0	3	–	8	–	0
North Carolina Central	2	–	4	–	0	3	–	8	–	0
$ – Conference champion; The conference was a hybrid of NCAA Division I-AA and Division II programs. Morgan State, Maryland-Eastern Shore, and North Carolina Central were classified as NCAA Division II. All the other teams were Division I-AA.; Rankings from Associated Press poll

The 1978 Delaware State Hornets football team represented Delaware State College (now known as Delaware State University) as a member of the Mid-Eastern Athletic Conference (MEAC) during the 1978 NCAA Division I-AA football season. Led by fourth-year head coach Ed Wyche, the Hornets compiled an overall record of 3–7, with a mark of 3–3 in conference play, and finished third in the MEAC.

== Schedule ==
Date	Opponent	Site	Result	Attendance	Source
September 9	South Carolina State	Alumni Stadium; Dover, DE	L 0–34	2,000	
September 16	at Clarion*	Memorial Stadium; Clarion, PA	L 10–31		
September 23	at No. 7 Florida A&M*	Doak Campbell Stadium; Tallahassee, FL	L 0–37	17,532	
September 30	Maryland Eastern Shore	Alumni Stadium; Dover, DE	L 7–17	1,200	
October 7	at Howard	Howard Stadium; Washington, DC	L 6–37		
October 14	North Carolina Central	Alumni Stadium; Dover, DE	W 16–13	13,500	
October 21	at Morgan State	Hughes Stadium; Baltimore, MD	W 13–6	16,423	
October 28	at Kentucky State*	Alumni Field; Frankfort, KY	L 12–18		
November 4	at Bethune–Cookman*	Welch Memorial Stadium; Daytona Beach, FL	L 7–17	4,450	
November 11	at North Carolina A&T	World War Memorial Stadium; Greensboro, NC	W 9–6		
*Non-conference game; Rankings from AP Poll released prior to the game
