= 1978 Southern Jaguars football team =

American college football season

1978 Southern Jaguars football
- Conference: Southwestern Athletic Conference
- Record: 4–7 (2–4 SWAC)
- Head coach: Cass Jackson (1st season)
- Home stadium: BREC Memorial Stadium

1978 Southwestern Athletic Conference football standings
	Conf.					Overall
Team	W		L		T	W		L		T
Grambling State $	5	–	0	–	1	9	–	1	–	1
No. 2 Jackson State ^	5	–	1	–	0	10	–	2	–	0
Mississippi Valley State	3	–	2	–	1	6	–	3	–	1
Alcorn State	2	–	3	–	1	5	–	4	–	1
Southern	2	–	4	–	0	4	–	7	–	0
Texas Southern	1	–	4	–	1	3	–	7	–	1
Prairie View A&M	1	–	5	–	0	3	–	7	–	0
$ – Conference champion; ^ – NCAA Division I-AA playoff participant; The conference was a hybrid of NCAA Division I-AA and II programs. Mississippi Valley State and Prairie View were classified as NCAA Division II for the 1978 season. All the other teams were Division I-AA.; Rankings from Associated Press poll

The 1978 Southern Jaguars football team represented Southern University as a member of the Southwestern Athletic Conference (SWAC) during the 1978 NCAA Division I-AA football season. Led by first-year head coach Cass Jackson, the Jaguars compiled an overall record of 4–7, with a conference record of 2–4, and finished fifth in the SWAC.

== Schedule ==
Date	Opponent	Site	Result	Attendance	Source
September 9	at Tuskegee*	Alumni Bowl; Tuskegee, AL	W 35–17		
September 16	at Texas Southern	Astrodome; Houston, TX	L 11–20		
September 23	Prairie View A&M	BREC Memorial Stadium; Baton Rouge, LA	W 15–14		
September 30	Mississippi Valley State	BREC Memorial Stadium; Baton Rouge, LA	W 22–14	6,700	
October 7	vs. Alabama State*	Ladd Stadium; Mobile, AL (Gulf Coast Classic)	L 6–9		
October 14	No. 4 Jackson State	BREC Memorial Stadium; Baton Rouge, LA	L 14–41		
October 21	at Alcorn State	Mississippi Veterans Memorial Stadium; Jackson, MS	L 7–16		
October 28	at Tennessee State*	Hale Stadium; Nashville, TN	L 13–30		
November 4	Howard*	BREC Memorial Stadium; Baton Rouge, LA	W 28–20		
November 18	No. 3 Florida A&M*	Tiger Stadium; Baton Rouge, LA	L 12–16		
November 25	vs. Grambling State	Louisiana Superdome; New Orleans, LA (Bayou Classic)	L 15–28	75,000	
*Non-conference game; Rankings from AP Poll released prior to the game
