= Ed Wyche =

American football coach (1933–2016)

Biographical details
- Born: June 15, 1933
- Died: February 16, 2016 (aged 82); Dover, Delaware, U.S.

Playing career
- c. 1955: Florida A&M
- Position: Center

Coaching career (HC unless noted)
- c. 1960: Attucks HS (FL)
- 1973: Howard (interim HC)
- 1974: Norfolk (assistant)
- 1975–1978: Delaware State
- 1980: Hampton (AHC/DC)
- 1981–1983: Hampton
- 1984–1985: Alabama A&M
- 1987: Cheyney (assistant)
- 1988–1990: Morgan State

Administrative career (AD unless noted)
- 1979: Seattle Seahawks (scout)
- 1998–2002: Fort Valley State

Head coaching record
- Overall: 61–71–5 (college)
- Bowls: 0–1

Accomplishments and honors

Awards
- MEAC Coach of the Year (1977)

Edmond Wyche Jr. (June 15, 1933 – February 16, 2016) was an American football coach. He served as the head football coach at Howard University (1973), Delaware State University (1975–1978), Hampton University (1981–1983), Alabama A&M University (1984–1985), and Morgan State University (1988–1990), compiling a career college football coaching record of 61–71–5. Wyche played football at Union Academy High School in Bartow, Florida and Florida A&M University. He earned a master's degree from Howard.

== Head coaching record ==
=== College ===
Year	Team	Overall	Conference	Standing	Bowl/playoffs
Howard Bison (Mid-Eastern Athletic Conference) (1973)
1973	Howard	8–2	4–2	T–3rd	
Howard:		8–2	4–2		
Delaware State Hornets (Mid-Eastern Athletic Conference) (1975–1978)
1975	Delaware State	5–5	2–4	5th	
1976	Delaware State	3–7–1	1–5	T–6th	
1977	Delaware State	7–4	4–2	3rd	L Orange Blossom Classic
1978	Delaware State	3–7	3–3	3rd	
Delaware State:		18–23–1	10–14		
Hampton Pirates (Central Intercollegiate Athletic Association) (1981–1983)
1981	Hampton	8–2	5–2	3rd (Northern)	
1982	Hampton	8–2	5–2	T–2nd (Northern)	
1983	Hampton	5–5	4–3	3rd (Northern)	
Hampton:		21–9	14–7		
Alabama A&M Bulldogs (Southern Intercollegiate Athletic Conference) (1984–1985)
1984	Alabama A&M	5–4–2	4–2–1		
1985	Alabama A&M	3–7–1			
Alabama A&M:		8–11–3			
Morgan State Bears (Mid-Eastern Athletic Conference) (1988–1990)
1988	Morgan State	1–10	0–6	7th	
1989	Morgan State	4–6–1	2–4	T–6th	
1990	Morgan State	1–10	0–6	7th	
Morgan State:		6–26–1	2–16		
Total:		61–71–5			
