= 1978 North Carolina Central Eagles football team =

American college football season

1978 North Carolina Central Eagles football
- Conference: Mid-Eastern Athletic Conference
- Record: 3–8 (1–4 MEAC)
- Head coach: Ray Greene (1st season)
- Home stadium: O'Kelly Stadium; Wallace Wade Stadium

1978 Mid-Eastern Athletic Conference football standings
	Conf.					Overall
Team	W		L		T	W		L		T
No. 6 South Carolina State $	5	–	0	–	1	8	–	2	–	1
North Carolina A&T	4	–	2	–	0	6	–	6	–	0
Delaware State	3	–	3	–	0	3	–	7	–	0
Morgan State	2	–	3	–	1	4	–	6	–	1
Howard	2	–	4	–	0	4	–	6	–	0
Maryland Eastern Shore	2	–	4	–	0	3	–	8	–	0
North Carolina Central	2	–	4	–	0	3	–	8	–	0
$ – Conference champion; The conference was a hybrid of NCAA Division I-AA and Division II programs. Morgan State, Maryland-Eastern Shore, and North Carolina Central were classified as NCAA Division II. All the other teams were Division I-AA.; Rankings from Associated Press poll

The 1978 North Carolina Central Eagles football team represented North Carolina Central University as a member of the Mid-Eastern Athletic Conference (MEAC) during the 1978 NCAA Division II football season. Led by first-year head coach Ray Greene, the Eagles compiled an overall record of 3–8, with a mark of 1–4 in conference play, and finished tied for fifth in the MEAC.

== Schedule ==
Date	Opponent	Site	Result	Attendance	Source
September 11	at Virginia Union*	Hovey Field; Richmond, VA	L 35–36	1,500–2,000	
September 16	Winston-Salem State*	O'Kelly Stadium; Durham, NC	L 18–24	11,500	
September 30	at Morgan State	Hughes Stadium; Baltimore, MD	W 14–0	4,560–10,000	
October 7	Elon*	O'Kelly Stadium; Durham, NC	L 7–35	6,500	
October 14	at Delaware State	Alumni Stadium; Dover, DE	L 13–16	13,500	
October 21	Maryland Eastern Shore	O'Kelly Stadium; Durham, NC	W 29–23	2,000–13,500	
October 28	at No. 7 South Carolina State	State College Stadium; Orangeburg, SC	L 15–17		
November 4	vs. Tennessee State*	RFK Stadium; Washington, DC	L 7–41	8,500	
November 11	at Howard	Howard Stadium; Washington, DC	L 17–24		
November 18	North Carolina A&T	Wallace Wade Stadium; Durham, NC (rivalry)	L 13–17	18,000	
November 25	Johnson C. Smith*	O'Kelly Stadium; Durham, NC	W 56–0		
*Non-conference game; Rankings from AP Poll released prior to the game
