= 1978 Eastern Kentucky Colonels football team =

American college football season

1978 Eastern Kentucky Colonels football
- Conference: Ohio Valley Conference

Ranking
- AP: No. 8
- Record: 8–2 (6–1 OVC)
- Head coach: Roy Kidd (15th season)
- Home stadium: Hanger Field

1978 Ohio Valley Conference football standings
	Conf.					Overall
Team	W		L		T	W		L		T
No. T–4 Western Kentucky $	7	–	0	–	0	8	–	2	–	0
No. 8 Eastern Kentucky	6	–	1	–	0	8	–	2	–	0
Tennessee Tech	4	–	3	–	0	5	–	6	–	0
Austin Peay	4	–	3	–	0	6	–	4	–	0
Murray State	2	–	5	–	0	4	–	7	–	0
Morehead State	2	–	5	–	0	2	–	6	–	1
Middle Tennessee	1	–	6	–	0	1	–	9	–	1
$ – Conference champion; Rankings from Associated Press poll

The 1978 Eastern Kentucky Colonels football team represented Eastern Kentucky University as a member of the Ohio Valley Conference (OVC) during the 1978 NCAA Division I-AA football season. Led by 15th-year head coach Roy Kidd, the Colonels compiled an overall record of 8–2, with a mark of 6–1 in conference play, and finished second in the OVC.

== Schedule ==
Date	Opponent	Rank	Site	Result	Attendance	Source
September 16	at Troy State*		Veterans Memorial Stadium; Troy, AL	L 10–16	7,000	
September 23	East Tennessee State		Hanger Field; Richmond, KY	W 49–6	13,200	
September 30	at Austin Peay		Municipal Stadium; Clarksville, TN	W 14–0		
October 7	Middle Tennessee	No. T–10	Hanger Field; Richmond, KY	W 42–12	8,700	
October 14	at Dayton*	No. 8	Welcome Stadium; Dayton, OH	W 17–16		
October 21	at Western Kentucky	No. 7	L. T. Smith Stadium; Bowling Green, KY (rivalry)	L 16–17	19,100	
October 28	Murray State	No. T–9	Hanger Field; Richmond, KY	W 24–21		
November 4	at Tennessee Tech	No. 9	Tucker Stadium; Cookeville, TN	W 20–16	5,000	
November 11	Akron*	No. 8	Hanger Field; Richmond, KY	W 35–14	8,800	
November 18	Morehead State	No. 8	Hanger Field; Richmond, KY (rivalry)	W 30–0	9,500	
*Non-conference game; Rankings from Associated Press Poll released prior to the game
