= Joe Redmond (American football) =

American football coach

Biographical details
- Born: c. 1945
- Education: Fisk (1967)

Coaching career (HC unless noted)
- 1973–1976: Northern Illinois (OB)
- 1977: Northern Illinois (OC)
- 1978: Maryland Eastern Shore
- 1979–1980: Central State (OH)
- 1981–1983: Texas Southern
- 1984–1985: Marshall (assistant)
- 1986–1987: Florida A&M (assistant)
- 1988: Los Angeles Valley (assistant)
- 1989–1990: Joliet
- 1991–1994: Knoxville
- 1995: Morris Brown
- 1999–2000: Dillard HS (FL)

Administrative career (AD unless noted)
- 1992–1995: Knoxville

Head coaching record
- Overall: 39–72–4 (college)

Joseph R. Redmond (born c. 1945) is an American former football coach. He served as the head football coach at the University of Maryland Eastern Shore (1978), Central State University in Wilberforce, Ohio (1979–1980), Texas Southern University (1981–1983), Knoxville College in Knoxville, Tennessee (1991–1994), and Morris Brown College in Atlanta, Georgia (1995).

In 1977, he became the first African American football coach to be named offensive coordinator at an NCAA Division I school.

== Head coaching record ==
=== College ===
| Year | Team | Overall | Conference | Standing | Bowl/playoffs |
|---|---|---|---|---|---|
Maryland Eastern Shore Hawks (Mid-Eastern Athletic Conference) (1978)
| 1978 | Maryland Eastern Shore | 3–8 | 2–4 | T–5th | |
| Maryland Eastern Shore: | | 3–8 | 2–4 | | |
Central State Marauders (NCAA Division II independent) (1979–1980)
| 1979 | Central State | 5–5 | | | |
| 1980 | Central State | 4–6–1 | | | |
| Central State: | | 9–11–1 | | | |
Texas Southern Tigers (Southwestern Athletic Conference) (1981–1983)
| 1981 | Texas Southern | 4–6–1 | 2–5 | 6th | |
| 1982 | Texas Southern | 1–9–1 | 1–6 | 7th | |
| 1983 | Texas Southern | 4–6 | 1–5 | 7th | |
| Texas Southern: | | 9–21–2 | | | |
Knoxville Bulldogs (NAIA Division II independent) (1991–1994)
| 1991 | Knoxville | 5–5 | | | |
| 1992 | Knoxville | 4–6 | | | |
| 1993 | Knoxville | 6–4 | | | |
| 1994 | Knoxville | 2–8–1 | | | |
| Knoxville: | | 17–23–1 | | | |
Morris Brown Wolverines (Southern Intercollegiate Athletic Conference) (1995)
| 1995 | Morris Brown | 1–9 | 1–7 | 9th | |
| Morris Brown: | | 1–9 | 1–7 | | |
| Total: | | 39–72–4 | | | |
