= 1978 Florida A&M Rattlers football team =

American college football season

1978 Florida A&M Rattlers football

NCAA Division I-AA champion Black college national champion SIAC champion

NCAA Division I-AA Championship Game, W 35–28 vs. UMass
- Conference: Southern Intercollegiate Athletic Conference

Ranking
- AP: No. 3
- Record: 12–1 (5–0 SIAC)
- Head coach: Rudy Hubbard (5th season)
- Defensive coordinator: Fred Goldsmith (5th season)
- Home stadium: Bragg Memorial Stadium

1978 Southern Intercollegiate Athletic Conference football standings
	Conf.					Overall
Team	W		L		T	W		L		T
Division I
No. 3 Florida A&M x^	5	–	0	–	0	12	–	1	–	0
Bethune–Cookman	3	–	2	–	0	7	–	3	–	1
Alabama A&M	4	–	1	–	0	7	–	4	–	0
Morris Brown	4	–	4	–	0	5	–	5	–	0
Albany State	3	–	3	–	1	4	–	5	–	1
Tuskegee	3	–	3	–	0	3	–	7	–	0
Division II
Clark x	7	–	2	–	0	7	–	2	–	0
Fort Valley State	4	–	3	–	2	6	–	3	–	2
Knoxville	5	–	2	–	0	6	–	4	–	0
Morehouse	4	–	5	–	0	4	–	5	–	0
Savannah State	4	–	5	–	0	4	–	6	–	0
Miles	2	–	5	–	1	2	–	6	–	1
Lane	1	–	4	–	2	1	–	5	–	2
x – Division champion/co-champions; ^ – NCAA Division I-AA playoff participant; Rankings from Associated Press poll

The 1978 Florida A&M Rattlers football team represented Florida A&M University in the 1978 NCAA Division I-AA football season. The Rattlers had an overall record of 12–1 and were the NCAA Division I-AA champions.

The Rattlers were led by fifth year head coach Rudy Hubbard; they played some home games at Bragg Memorial Stadium on their own campus, and other home games at the larger Doak Campbell Stadium on the campus of Florida State University. They finished their regular season with a 9–1 record, including a win over Bethune–Cookman in the Florida Classic rivalry game. The Rattlers then beat Grambling State in the Orange Blossom Classic to secure a spot in the I-AA playoffs. In the playoffs, the Rattlers won on the road against Jackson State, then beat UMass in the championship game, the Pioneer Bowl played in Wichita Falls, Texas.

In 1978, Florida A&M was a member of the Southern Intercollegiate Athletic Conference (SIAC), an NCAA Division II conference. The university had successfully petitioned the NCAA for NCAA Division I classification (NCAA Division I-AA in football), which took effect on September 1, 1978. The Rattlers captured the SIAC title in 1978, going undefeated in five conference games. This was the Rattlers' last season as a member of SIAC, as they joined the Mid-Eastern Athletic Conference (MEAC) the following year.

Statistical leaders for the season included Ike Williams (1,274 yards rushing), Albert Chester (1,088 yards passing), Chris Douglas (228 yards receiving), and Mike Solomon (12 touchdowns). A notable member of the team was placekicker Vince Coleman, went on to play 13 seasons in Major League Baseball, well known for his time with the St. Louis Cardinals.

== Schedule ==
Date	Time	Opponent	Rank	Site	TV	Result	Attendance	Source
September 16	1:30 p.m.	at Albany State		Mills Memorial Stadium; Albany, GA		W 21–7	11,501	
September 23	7:00 p.m.	Delaware State*	No. 7	Doak Campbell Stadium; Tallahassee, FL		W 37–0	17,532	
September 30	7:00 p.m.	Howard*	No. 7	Bragg Memorial Stadium; Tallahassee, FL		W 28–7	11,882	
October 7	7:30 p.m.	Maryland Eastern Shore*	No. 7	Gator Bowl Stadium; Jacksonville, FL		W 45–0	30,100	
October 14	1:30 p.m.	at Morris Brown	No. 7	Herndon Stadium; Atlanta, GA		W 56–0	12,776	
October 21	7:00 p.m.	Tennessee State*	No. 4	Doak Campbell Stadium; Tallahassee, FL		L 21–24	29,820	
October 28	7:00 p.m.	Tuskegee	No. 5	Bragg Memorial Stadium; Tallahassee, FL		W 41–13	11,793	
November 4	1:30 p.m.	Alabama A&M^{†}	No. 3	Doak Campbell Stadium; Tallahassee, FL		W 42–0	21,637	
November 18	4:10 p.m.	at Southern*	No. 3	Tiger Stadium; Baton Rouge, LA	ABC	W 16–12	18,000	
November 25	1:30 p.m.	vs. Bethune–Cookman	No. 3	Tampa Stadium; Tampa, FL (rivalry)		W 27–17	40,868	
December 2	7:30 p.m.	vs. Grambling State*	No. 3	Orange Bowl; Miami, FL (Orange Blossom Classic)		W 31–7	35,499	
December 9	1:30 p.m.	at No. 2 Jackson State*	No. 3	Mississippi Veterans Memorial Stadium; Jackson, MS (NCAA Division I-AA Semifinal)	ABC	W 15–10	12,000	
December 16	1:30 p.m.	vs. No. T–4 UMass*	No. 3	Memorial Stadium; Wichita Falls, TX (NCAA Division I-AA Championship Game—Pioneer Bowl)	ABC	W 35–28	13,604	
*Non-conference game; ^{†}Homecoming; Rankings from Associated Press Poll released prior to the game; All times are in Eastern time

== Roster ==
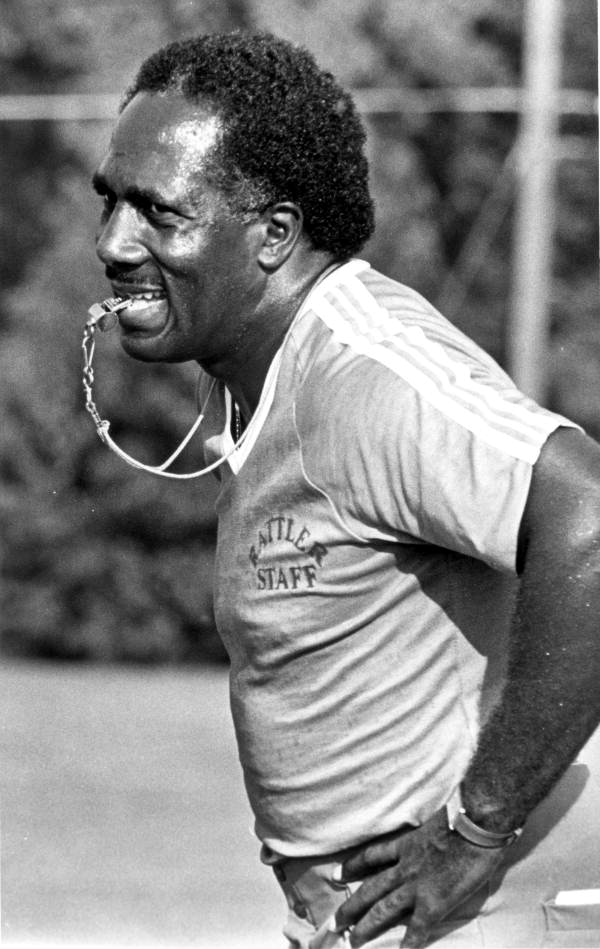
Head coach Rudy Hubbard

1978 Florida A&M Rattlers football team roster
Players			Coaches
Offense: Pos. / # / Name / Class; TE / 87 / David Greene / Sr	Defense: Pos. / # / Name / Class	Special teams: Pos. / # / Name / Class	Head coach: Rudy Hubbard; Coordinators/assistant coaches Legend: (C) Team captain; (S) Suspended; (I) Ineligible; Injured; Redshirt
