= 1978 Maryland Eastern Shore Hawks football team =

American college football season

1978 Maryland Eastern Shore Hawks football
- Conference: Mid-Eastern Athletic Conference
- Record: 3–8 (2–4 MEAC)
- Head coach: Joe Redmond (1st season)
- Defensive coordinator: Tyrone Caldwell (1st season)

1978 Mid-Eastern Athletic Conference football standings
	Conf.					Overall
Team	W		L		T	W		L		T
No. 6 South Carolina State $	5	–	0	–	1	8	–	2	–	1
North Carolina A&T	4	–	2	–	0	6	–	6	–	0
Delaware State	3	–	3	–	0	3	–	7	–	0
Morgan State	2	–	3	–	1	4	–	6	–	1
Howard	2	–	4	–	0	4	–	6	–	0
Maryland Eastern Shore	2	–	4	–	0	3	–	8	–	0
North Carolina Central	2	–	4	–	0	3	–	8	–	0
$ – Conference champion; The conference was a hybrid of NCAA Division I-AA and Division II programs. Morgan State, Maryland-Eastern Shore, and North Carolina Central were classified as NCAA Division II. All the other teams were Division I-AA.; Rankings from Associated Press poll

The 1978 Maryland Eastern Shore Hawks football team represented the University of Maryland Eastern Shore as a member of the Mid-Eastern Athletic Conference (MEAC) during the 1978 NCAA Division II football season. Led by first-year head coach Joe Redmond, the Hawks compiled an overall record of 3–8, with a mark of 2–4 in conference play, and finished tied for fifth in the MEAC.

== Schedule ==
Date	Opponent	Site	Result	Attendance	Source
September 2	vs. Morgan State	Baynard Stadium; Wilmington, DE	L 10–13	3,000–6,000	
September 9	at North Carolina A&T	World War Memorial Stadium; Greensboro, NC	L 7–23	5,000	
September 16	Howard	Princess Anne, MD	W 23–21	2,000	
September 23	at Livingstone*	Alumni Memorial Stadium; Salisbury, NC	L 36–37	2,000	
September 30	at Delaware State	Alumni Stadium; Dover, DE	W 17–7	1,200	
October 7	vs. No. 7 Florida A&M*	Gator Bowl Stadium; Jacksonville, FL	L 0–45	30,100	
October 14	at Alabama State*	Cramton Bowl; Montgomery, AL	L 12–48	3,000	
October 21	at North Carolina Central	O'Kelly Stadium; Durham, NC	L 23–29	2,000–13,500	
October 28	District of Columbia*	Princess Anne, MD	W 38–19	5,200	
November 4	vs. No. T–4 South Carolina State	Johnson Hagood Stadium; Charleston, SC	L 0–54	13,000	
November 11	at Frostburg State*	Bobcat Stadium; Frostburg, MD	L 0–30	3,000	
*Non-conference game; Rankings from AP Poll released prior to the game
