= 1978 Austin Peay Governors football team =

American college football season

1978 Austin Peay Governors football
- Conference: Ohio Valley Conference
- Record: 6–4 (3–3 OVC)
- Head coach: Boots Donnelly (2nd season)
- Home stadium: Municipal Stadium

1978 Ohio Valley Conference football standings
	Conf.					Overall
Team	W		L		T	W		L		T
No. T–4 Western Kentucky $	7	–	0	–	0	8	–	2	–	0
No. 8 Eastern Kentucky	6	–	1	–	0	8	–	2	–	0
Tennessee Tech	4	–	3	–	0	5	–	6	–	0
Austin Peay	4	–	3	–	0	6	–	4	–	0
Murray State	2	–	5	–	0	4	–	7	–	0
Morehead State	2	–	5	–	0	2	–	6	–	1
Middle Tennessee	1	–	6	–	0	1	–	9	–	1
$ – Conference champion; Rankings from Associated Press poll

The 1978 Austin Peay Governors football team represented Austin Peay State University as a member of the Ohio Valley Conference (OVC) during the 1978 NCAA Division I-AA football season. Led by second-year head coach Boots Donnelly, the Governors compiled an overall record of 6–4, with a mark of 3–3 in conference play, and finished tied for third in the OVC.

== Schedule ==
Date	Opponent	Rank	Site	Result	Attendance	Source
September 9	at Tennessee–Martin*		Pacer Stadium; Martin, TN	W 21–14		
September 23	at Western Kentucky	No. 10	L. T. Smith Stadium; Bowling Green, KY	L 13–17	15,200	
September 30	Eastern Kentucky		Municipal Stadium; Clarksville, TN	L 0–14		
October 7	Morehead State		Municipal Stadium; Clarksville, TN	W 19–16		
October 14	North Alabama*		Municipal Stadium; Clarksville, TN	L 6–10		
October 21	at Livingston*		Tiger Stadium; Livingston, AL	W 13–3		
October 28	at Middle Tennessee		Horace Jones Field; Murfreesboro, TN	W 28–17		
November 4	Murray State^{†}		Municipal Stadium; Clarksville, TN	W 23–17	8,000	
November 11	Tennessee Tech		Municipal Stadium; Clarksville, TN	L 14–28	4,500	
November 18	at East Tennessee State		Memorial Center; Johnson City, TN	W 14–7		
*Non-conference game; ^{†}Homecoming; Rankings from Associated Press Poll released prior to the game
