= 1978 South Carolina State Bulldogs football team =

American college football season

1978 South Carolina State Bulldogs football

MEAC champion
- Conference: Mid-Eastern Athletic Conference

Ranking
- AP: No. 6
- Record: 8–2–1 (5–0–1 MEAC)
- Head coach: Willie Jeffries (6th season)
- Home stadium: State College Stadium

1978 Mid-Eastern Athletic Conference football standings
	Conf.					Overall
Team	W		L		T	W		L		T
No. 6 South Carolina State $	5	–	0	–	1	8	–	2	–	1
North Carolina A&T	4	–	2	–	0	6	–	6	–	0
Delaware State	3	–	3	–	0	3	–	7	–	0
Morgan State	2	–	3	–	1	4	–	6	–	1
Howard	2	–	4	–	0	4	–	6	–	0
Maryland Eastern Shore	2	–	4	–	0	3	–	8	–	0
North Carolina Central	2	–	4	–	0	3	–	8	–	0
$ – Conference champion; The conference was a hybrid of NCAA Division I-AA and Division II programs. Morgan State, Maryland-Eastern Shore, and North Carolina Central were classified as NCAA Division II. All the other teams were Division I-AA.; Rankings from Associated Press poll

The 1978 South Carolina State Bulldogs football team represented South Carolina State College (now known as South Carolina State University) as a member of the Mid-Eastern Athletic Conference (MEAC) during the 1978 NCAA Division I-AA football season. Led by sixth-year head coach Willie Jeffries, the Bulldogs compiled an overall record of 8–2–1, with a mark of 5–0–1 in conference play, and finished as MEAC champion.

== Schedule ==
Date	Opponent	Rank	Site	Result	Attendance	Source
September 2	Virginia State*		State College Stadium; Orangeburg, SC	W 47–0		
September 9	at Delaware State		Alumni Stadium; Dover, DE	W 34–0	2,000	
September 16	at North Carolina A&T		World War Memorial Stadium; Greensboro, NC (rivalry)	W 34–7	20,000	
September 23	vs. Howard	No. T–1	Giants Stadium; East Rutherford, NJ	W 27–0	17,139	
September 30	Alcorn State*	No. 2	State College Stadium; Orangeburg, SC	W 16–0		
October 7	Johnson C. Smith*	No. 1	State College Stadium; Orangeburg, SC	W 34–10		
October 14	at Morgan State	No. 1	Hughes Stadium; Baltimore, MD	T 7–7	3,500	
October 21	Newberry*	No. 6	State College Stadium; Orangeburg, SC	L 0–14		
October 28	North Carolina Central	No. 7	State College Stadium; Orangeburg, SC	W 17–15		
November 4	vs. Maryland Eastern Shore	No. T–4	Johnson Hagood Stadium; Charleston, SC	W 54–0	13,000	
November 11	at Grambling State*	No. 4	Grambling Stadium; Grambling, LA	L 15–19		
*Non-conference game; Rankings from AP Poll released prior to the game
