= Ray Greene (American football) =

American football coach (1938–2022)

Biographical details
- Born: August 12, 1938; Akron, Ohio, U.S.
- Died: June 17, 2022 (aged 83)

Playing career

Football
- 1959–1961: Akron
- Position: Defensive end

Coaching career (HC unless noted)

Football
- 1964–1965: Kenmore HS (OH) (assistant)
- 1966–1967: Dan McCarty HS (FL) (assistant)
- 1968: Miami (FL) (grad assistant)
- 1969–1973: Iowa State (WR)
- 1974–1975: Jacksonville Sharks/Express (OC)
- 1976–1977: Michigan State (WR)
- 1978: North Carolina Central
- 1979–1983: Alabama A&M
- 1984: Alabama State (OC/AHC)
- 1985: Jackson State (assistant)
- 1986–1988: Alabama A&M
- 200?: Tennessee Valley Vipers (OC/AHC)

Track
- 1967–1968: Dan McCarty HS (FL)

Head coaching record
- Overall: 56–35–5 (college football)
- Tournaments: Football; 1–1 (NCAA D-II playoffs)

Accomplishments and honors

Championships
- Football; 3 SIAC (1979, 1981, 1987)

Ray Greene (August 12, 1938 – June 17, 2022) was an American football coach. He served as the head football coach at North Carolina Central University for one season, in 1978, and two stints as the head football coach at Alabama A&M University, from 1979 to 1983 and 1986 to 1988, compiling a career college football head coaching record of 56–35–5.

== Early life and playing career ==
Greene was born August 12, 1938, in Akron, Ohio. He graduated from Akron South High School in 1956. Greene played football and ran track at the University of Akron. In football, he earned All-Ohio Athletic Conference (OAC) honors in 1960 and 1961.

== Coaching career ==
Greene was an assistant football coach at Kenmore High School in Akron under head coach Mick Viland from 1964 to 1965. He moved to Viland in 1966 to Dan McCarty High School, located in Fort Pierce, Florida. Greene was the first African-American to coach at McCarty. He was appointed as the school's head track coach in 1967.

Greene was an assistant football coach in 1968 at the University of Miami in Coral Gables, Florida. In 1969, he was hired an assistant football coach at Iowa State University by head football coach Johnny Majors, becoming the first African-American hired for a full-time coaching position at the school. Green coached Iowa State's wide receivers for four seasons under Majors. When Majors left Iowa State to become the head football coach at the University of Pittsburgh in December 1972, Greene interviewed to succeed him. The Iowa State head coaching position went to Earle Bruce, who retained Green as wide receivers coach for the 1973 season.

== Broadcasting career and death ==
After his coaching career, Greene went into sportscasting, working as a color analyst for a number of sports in the Tennessee Valley. He died on June 17, 2022, at the age of 83.

== Head coaching record ==
=== College football ===
Year	Team	Overall	Conference	Standing	Bowl/playoffs
North Carolina Central Eagles (Mid-Eastern Athletic Conference) (1978)
1978	North Carolina Central	3–8	1–4	7th	
North Carolina Central:		3–8	1–4		
Alabama A&M Bulldogs (Southern Intercollegiate Athletic Conference) (1979–1983)
1979	Alabama A&M	8–3	4–0	1st	L NCAA Division II Semifinal
1980	Alabama A&M	5–4–1	2–1–1		
1981	Alabama A&M	8–2	5–0	1st	
1982	Alabama A&M	6–4–1			
1983	Alabama A&M	7–3–1	6–1		
Alabama A&M Bulldogs (Southern Intercollegiate Athletic Conference) (1986–1988)
1986	Alabama A&M	5–4–2	2–3–2		
1987	Alabama A&M	7–4	6–1	T–1st	
1988	Alabama A&M	7–3	6–1		
Alabama A&M:		53–27–5			
Total:		56–35–5			
National championship Conference title Conference division title or championship game berth
