= 1978 Jackson State Tigers football team =

American college football season

1978 Jackson State Tigers football

NCAA Division I-AA Semifinal, L 10–15 vs. Florida A&M
- Conference: Southwestern Athletic Conference

Ranking
- AP: No. 2 (NCAA Division I-AA)
- Record: 10–2 (5–1 SWAC)
- Head coach: W. C. Gorden (3rd season)
- Home stadium: Mississippi Veterans Memorial Stadium

1978 Southwestern Athletic Conference football standings
	Conf.					Overall
Team	W		L		T	W		L		T
Grambling State $	5	–	0	–	1	9	–	1	–	1
No. 2 Jackson State ^	5	–	1	–	0	10	–	2	–	0
Mississippi Valley State	3	–	2	–	1	6	–	3	–	1
Alcorn State	2	–	3	–	1	5	–	4	–	1
Southern	2	–	4	–	0	4	–	7	–	0
Texas Southern	1	–	4	–	1	3	–	7	–	1
Prairie View A&M	1	–	5	–	0	3	–	7	–	0
$ – Conference champion; ^ – NCAA Division I-AA playoff participant; The conference was a hybrid of NCAA Division I-AA and II programs. Mississippi Valley State and Prairie View were classified as NCAA Division II for the 1978 season. All the other teams were Division I-AA.; Rankings from Associated Press poll

The 1978 Jackson State Tigers football team represented Jackson State University as a member of the Southwestern Athletic Conference (SWAC) during the 1978 NCAA Division I-AA football season. Led by third-year head coach W. C. Gorden, the Tigers compiled an overall record of 10–2 with a mark of 5–1 in conference play, placing second in the SWAC. Jackson State advanced to the NCAA Division I-AA Football Championship playoffs, where the lost in the semifinals to the eventual national champion, Florida A&M.

== Schedule ==
Date	Opponent	Rank	Site	TV	Result	Attendance	Source
September 2	at Alabama State*		Cramton Bowl; Montgomery, AL		W 20–6		
September 9	at Tennessee State*		Dudley Field; Nashville, TN		W 35–24	17,000	
September 16	Prairie View A&M		Mississippi Veterans Memorial Stadium; Jackson, MS		W 41–14		
September 23	Mississippi Valley State	No. 4	Mississippi Veterans Memorial Stadium; Jackson, MS		W 27–16	23,833	
October 7	Arkansas–Pine Bluff*	No. 4	Mississippi Veterans Memorial Stadium; Jackson, MS		W 54–14		
October 14	at Southern	No. 4	BREC Memorial Stadium; Baton Rouge, LA		W 41–14		
October 21	at Grambling State	No. 2	Grambling Stadium; Grambling, LA		L 7–13		
October 28	Bethune–Cookman*	No. 4	Mississippi Veterans Memorial Stadium; Jackson, MS		W 35–6		
November 4	Texas Southern	No. 2	Mississippi Veterans Memorial Stadium; Jackson, MS		W 41–0		
November 11	Morgan State*	No. 2	Mississippi Veterans Memorial Stadium; Jackson, MS		W 21–6	5,000–11,000	
November 18	at Alcorn State	No. 2	Henderson Stadium; Lorman, MS (rivalry)		W 38–8		
December 9	No. 3 Florida A&M*	No. 2	Mississippi Veterans Memorial Stadium; Jackson, MS (NCAA Division I-AA Semifinal)	ABC	L 10–15	12,000	
*Non-conference game; Rankings from Associated Press Poll released prior to the game
