= Clarence Thomas (American football) =

American football coach (1945–2011)

Biographical details
- Born: October 17, 1945
- Died: February 20, 2011 (aged 65)

Playing career
- c. 1965: Morgan State
- Positions: Center, linebacker

Coaching career (HC unless noted)
- 1972: Morgan State (DL)
- 1973: Montgomery Blair HS (MD)
- 1974–1975: Bowie State
- 1976–1977: Williams (assistant)
- 1978–1980: Morgan State
- 1982–1993: Pomona-Pitzer

Head coaching record
- Overall: 52–96–3 (college)
- Tournaments: 0–1 (NCAA D-II playoffs)

Accomplishments and honors

Championships
- 1 MEAC (1979)

Awards
- MEAC Coach of the Year (1979)

Clarence "Motts" Thomas (October 17, 1945 – February 20, 2011) was an American football coach. He served as the head football coach at Bowie State University from 1974 to 1975, Morgan State University from 1978 to 1980, and at Pomona-Pitzer in Claremont, California from 1982 to 1993, compiling a career college football coaching record of 52–96–3.

Thomas played college football at Morgan State as a center and linebacker for head coach Earl Banks. He was an assistant at Morgan State in 1972 under Banks, coaching the defensive line. In 1973, Thomas was the appointed the head football coach at Montgomery Blair High School in Silver Spring, Maryland, becoming the first African-American head football coach in Montgomery County.

== Head coaching record ==
=== College ===
Year	Team	Overall	Conference	Standing	Bowl/playoffs
Bowie State Bulldogs (NCAA Division III independent) (1974–1975)
1974	Bowie State	5–3–1			
1975	Bowie State	9–1			
Bowie State:		14–4–1			
Morgan State Bears (Mid-Eastern Athletic Conference) (1978–1979)
1978	Morgan State	4–6–1	2–3–1	4th	
1979	Morgan State	9–2	5–0	1st	L NCAA Division II First Round
Morgan State Bears (NCAA Division II independent) (1980)
1980	Morgan State	4–7			
Morgan State:		17–15–1	7–3–1		
Pomona-Pitzer Sagehens (Southern California Intercollegiate Athletic Conference) (1982–1993)
1982	Pomona-Pitzer	1–7	0–5	6th	
1983	Pomona-Pitzer	1–8	0–5	6th	
1984	Pomona-Pitzer	1–6–1	0–4–1 (Note: From 1984 to 1990, the Southern California Intercollegiate Athletic Conference (SCIAC) football schedule included multiple head-to-head meetings each season. In 1984 and 1985, each conference member played two other conference members twice. From 1986 to 1990, each conference member played one other conference member twice. A head-to-head sweep of the two games in one season counted as one win for the winner and one loss for the loser in the conference standings. A split of the two games counted as a tie for each team.)	6th	
1985	Pomona-Pitzer	1–7	1–4	5th	
1986	Pomona-Pitzer	3–6	1–3–1	5th	
1987	Pomona-Pitzer	3–6	0–4–1	6th	
1988	Pomona-Pitzer	0–8	0–5	6th	
1989	Pomona-Pitzer	1–7	0–5	6th	
1990	Pomona-Pitzer	3–5	2–3	4th	
1991	Pomona-Pitzer	2–6	1–4	5th	
1992	Pomona-Pitzer	4–4	3–3	T–3rd	
1993	Pomona-Pitzer	1–7	0–6	7th	
Pomona-Pitzer:		21–77–1	8–51–3		
Total:		52–96–3			
National championship Conference title Conference division title or championship game berth
