= 1978 Prairie View A&M Panthers football team =

American college football season

1978 Prairie View A&M Panthers football
- Conference: Southwestern Athletic Conference
- Record: 3–7 (1–5 SWAC)
- Head coach: Hoover J. Wright (9th season)
- Home stadium: Edward L. Blackshear Field

1978 Southwestern Athletic Conference football standings
	Conf.					Overall
Team	W		L		T	W		L		T
Grambling State $	5	–	0	–	1	9	–	1	–	1
No. 2 Jackson State ^	5	–	1	–	0	10	–	2	–	0
Mississippi Valley State	3	–	2	–	1	6	–	3	–	1
Alcorn State	2	–	3	–	1	5	–	4	–	1
Southern	2	–	4	–	0	4	–	7	–	0
Texas Southern	1	–	4	–	1	3	–	7	–	1
Prairie View A&M	1	–	5	–	0	3	–	7	–	0
$ – Conference champion; ^ – NCAA Division I-AA playoff participant; The conference was a hybrid of NCAA Division I-AA and II programs. Mississippi Valley State and Prairie View were classified as NCAA Division II for the 1978 season. All the other teams were Division I-AA.; Rankings from Associated Press poll

The 1978 Prairie View A&M Panthers football team represented Prairie View A&M University as a member of the Southwestern Athletic Conference (SWAC) during the 1978 NCAA Division II football season. Led by ninth-year head coach Hoover J. Wright, the Panthers compiled an overall record of 3–7, with a conference record of 1–5, and finished seventh in the SWAC.

== Schedule ==
Date	Opponent	Site	Result	Attendance	Source
September 16	at Jackson State	Mississippi Veterans Memorial Stadium; Jackson, MS	L 14–41		
September 23	at Southern	BREC Memorial Stadium; Baton Rouge, LA	L 14–15		
September 30	vs. No. T–10 Grambling State	Cardinal Stadium; Beaumont, TX (rivalry)	L 6–37		
October 7	vs. Southwest Texas State*	Alamo Stadium; San Antonio, TX	L 6–58	6,500	
October 14	Texas Lutheran*	Edward L. Blackshear Field; Prairie View, TX	W 12–7		
October 21	vs. Bishop*	P.C. Cobb Stadium; Dallas, TX	L 34–35		
October 28	at Mississippi Valley State	Magnolia Stadium; Itta Bena, MS	L 23–42	4,912	
November 4	Arkansas–Pine Bluff*	Edward L. Blackshear Field; Prairie View, TX	W 20–12		
November 11	Alcorn State	Edward L. Blackshear Field; Prairie View, TX	L 7–28		
November 18	at Texas Southern	Astrodome; Houston, TX (rivalry)	W 20–6		
*Non-conference game; Rankings from AP Poll released prior to the game
