= 1978 Western Kentucky Hilltoppers football team =

American college football season

1978 Western Kentucky Hilltoppers football

OVC champion
- Conference: Ohio Valley Conference

Ranking
- AP: No. T–4
- Record: 8–2 (7–0 OVC)
- Head coach: Jimmy Feix (11th season)
- Home stadium: Houchens Industries–L. T. Smith Stadium

1978 Ohio Valley Conference football standings
	Conf.					Overall
Team	W		L		T	W		L		T
No. T–4 Western Kentucky $	7	–	0	–	0	8	–	2	–	0
No. 8 Eastern Kentucky	6	–	1	–	0	8	–	2	–	0
Tennessee Tech	4	–	3	–	0	5	–	6	–	0
Austin Peay	4	–	3	–	0	6	–	4	–	0
Murray State	2	–	5	–	0	4	–	7	–	0
Morehead State	2	–	5	–	0	2	–	6	–	1
Middle Tennessee	1	–	6	–	0	1	–	9	–	1
$ – Conference champion; Rankings from Associated Press poll

The 1978 Western Kentucky Hilltoppers football team represented Western Kentucky University in the inaugural 1978 NCAA Division I-AA football season and were led by head coach Jimmy Feix. The NCAA had formed NCAA Division I-AA for football and Western Kentucky, along with the rest of the Ohio Valley Conference (OVC), moved up from Division II to I-AA. The Hilltoppers won the OVC championship, but just missed the NCAA Division I-AA playoffs. The team finished the season tied for fourth in final national NCAA poll.

Western Kentucky's roster included future National Football League (NFL) players Carl Brazley, Darryl Drake, Ray Farmer, Ricky Gwinn, Lamont Meacham, Eddie Preston, Phil Rich, Troy Snardon, Brad Todd, Tony Towns, and Pete Walters. Towns was selected to play in the Blue-Gray Football Classic and Coach Feix was named OVC Coach of the Year for the second time. The All-Conference Team included Brazley, John Hall, Reginald Hayden, Preston, and Towns.

== Schedule ==
Date	Opponent	Rank	Site	Result	Attendance	Source
September 9	Chattanooga*		L. T. Smith Stadium; Bowling Green, KY	L 15–42	13,500	
September 16	at Illinois State*		Hancock Stadium; Normal, IL	W 28–6	12,000	
September 23	No. 10 Austin Peay		L. T. Smith Stadium; Bowling Green, KY	W 17–13	15,200	
September 30	at East Tennessee State		Memorial Center; Johnson City, TN	W 27–21	5,732	
October 7	No. 6 (D-II) Akron*	No. 10	L. T. Smith Stadium; Bowling Green, KY	L 21–26	15,600	
October 14	at Tennessee Tech		Tucker Stadium; Cookeville, TN	W 26–20	16,000	
October 21	No. 7 Eastern Kentucky		L. T. Smith Stadium; Bowling Green, KY (rivalry)	W 17–16	19,100	
October 28	at Morehead State	No. 8	Jayne Stadium; Morehead, KY	W 35–7	9,000	
November 4	Middle Tennessee^{†}	No. 7	L. T. Smith Stadium; Bowling Green, KY (rivalry)	W 54–0	19,500	
November 18	at Murray State	No. 4	Roy Stewart Stadium; Murray, KY (rivalry)	W 14–6	9,500	
*Non-conference game; ^{†}Homecoming; Rankings from Associated Press Poll released prior to the game
