= 1984 Alabama A&M Bulldogs football team =

American college football season

1984 Alabama A&M Bulldogs football
- Conference: Southern Intercollegiate Athletic Conference
- Record: 5–4–2 (4–2–1 SIAC)
- Head coach: Ed Wyche (1st season)
- Home stadium: Milton Frank Stadium

1984 Southern Intercollegiate Athletic Conference football standings
	Conf.					Overall
Team	W		L		T	W		L		T
Division II
Albany State x	7	–	1	–	0	7	–	2	–	0
Morris Brown	5	–	1	–	1	5	–	4	–	1
Fort Valley State	5	–	2	–	0	8	–	3	–	0
Morehouse	5	–	4	–	1	5	–	4	–	1
Alabama A&M	4	–	2	–	1	5	–	4	–	2
Clark	2	–	6	–	0	2	–	7	–	0
Savannah State	1	–	5	–	1	2	–	7	–	1
Tuskegee	1	–	7	–	0	1	–	8	–	0
Division III
Miles x	1	–	2	–	1	5	–	3	–	1
Knoxville	1	–	2	–	1	4	–	3	–	1
Lane	1	–	3	–	0	2	–	6	–	0
x – Division champion/co-champions; Rankings from AP Poll

The 1984 Alabama A&M Bulldogs football team represented Alabama Agricultural and Mechanical University as a member of the Southern Intercollegiate Athletic Conference (SIAC) during the 1984 NCAA Division II football season. The Bulldogs were led by first-year head coach Ed Wyche. They finished season with an overall record of 5–4–2 and a mark of 4–2–1 in conference play.

== Schedule ==
Date	Opponent	Site	Result	Attendance	Source
September 8	Jacksonville State*	Milton Frank Stadium; Huntsville, AL	T 6–6	8,500	
September 15	at Tennessee State*	Hale Stadium; Nashville, TN	L 21–42	13,000	
September 22	Albany State	Milton Frank Stadium; Huntsville, AL	L 23–24	5,400	
September 29	Morehouse	Milton Frank Stadium; Huntsville, AL	W 24–2	9,400	
October 6	at North Alabama*	Braly Municipal Stadium; Florence, AL	L 12–26	8,700	
October 13	at Fort Valley State	Wildcat Stadium; Fort Valley, GA	W 13–10	6,000	
October 20	at Morris Brown	Herndon Stadium; Atlanta, GA	L 24–28	2,800	
October 27	vs. Alabama State*	Legion Field; Birmingham, AL (Magic City Classic)	W 28–12	25,000	
November 3	Clark (GA)	Milton Frank Stadium; Huntsville, AL	W 32–6	3,500	
November 10	at Tuskegee	Abbott Memorial Alumni Stadium; Tuskegee, AL	W 20–14	8,000	
November 17	at Savannah State	Ted Wright Stadium; Savannah, GA	T 14–14	3,000	
*Non-conference game
