= 1978 Morgan State Bears football team =

American college football season

1978 Morgan State Bears football
- Conference: Mid-Eastern Athletic Conference
- Record: 4–6–1 (2–3–1 MEAC)
- Head coach: Clarence Thomas (1st season)
- Home stadium: Hughes Stadium

1978 Mid-Eastern Athletic Conference football standings
	Conf.					Overall
Team	W		L		T	W		L		T
No. 6 South Carolina State $	5	–	0	–	1	8	–	2	–	1
North Carolina A&T	4	–	2	–	0	6	–	6	–	0
Delaware State	3	–	3	–	0	3	–	7	–	0
Morgan State	2	–	3	–	1	4	–	6	–	1
Howard	2	–	4	–	0	4	–	6	–	0
Maryland Eastern Shore	2	–	4	–	0	3	–	8	–	0
North Carolina Central	2	–	4	–	0	3	–	8	–	0
$ – Conference champion; The conference was a hybrid of NCAA Division I-AA and Division II programs. Morgan State, Maryland-Eastern Shore, and North Carolina Central were classified as NCAA Division II. All the other teams were Division I-AA.; Rankings from Associated Press poll

The 1978 Morgan State Bears football team represented Morgan State University as a member of the Mid-Eastern Athletic Conference (MEAC) during the 1978 NCAA Division II football season. Led by first-year head coach Clarence Thomas, the Bears compiled an overall record of 4–6–1, and a mark of 2–3–1 in conference play, and finished fourth in the MEAC.

== Schedule ==
Date	Opponent	Site	Result	Attendance	Source
September 2	vs. Maryland Eastern Shore	Baynard Stadium; Wilmington, DE	W 13–10	3,000–6,000	
September 9	at Virginia State*	Rogers Stadium; Ettrick, VA	W 20–6	2,678	
September 23	vs. Grambling State*	Yankee Stadium; Bronx, NY	L 0–21	39,118	
September 30	North Carolina Central	Hughes Stadium; Baltimore, MD	L 0–14	4,560–10,000	
October 7	at UMass*	Alumni Stadium; Hadley, MA	L 6–38	6,700	
October 14	No. 1 South Carolina State	Hughes Stadium; Baltimore, MD	T 7–7	3,500	
October 21	Delaware State	Hughes Stadium; Baltimore, MD	L 6–13	16,423	
October 28	at North Carolina A&T	World War Memorial Stadium; Greensboro, NC	L 0–25	19,300	
November 4	Virginia Union*	Hughes Stadium; Baltimore, MD	W 10–6	2,100	
November 11	at No. 2 Jackson State*	Mississippi Veterans Memorial Stadium; Jackson, MS	L 6–21	5,000–11,000	
November 18	Howard	Howard Stadium; Washington, DC (rivalry)	W 10–9	2,000	
*Non-conference game; Rankings from AP Poll released prior to the game
