= 1978 Mississippi Valley State Delta Devils football team =

American college football season

1978 Mississippi Valley State Delta Devils football
- Conference: Southwestern Athletic Conference
- Record: 6–3–1 (3–2–1 SWAC)
- Head coach: Jim Thomas (1st season)
- Defensive coordinator: Ben McGee (1st season)
- Home stadium: Magnolia Stadium

1978 Southwestern Athletic Conference football standings
	Conf.					Overall
Team	W		L		T	W		L		T
Grambling State $	5	–	0	–	1	9	–	1	–	1
No. 2 Jackson State ^	5	–	1	–	0	10	–	2	–	0
Mississippi Valley State	3	–	2	–	1	6	–	3	–	1
Alcorn State	2	–	3	–	1	5	–	4	–	1
Southern	2	–	4	–	0	4	–	7	–	0
Texas Southern	1	–	4	–	1	3	–	7	–	1
Prairie View A&M	1	–	5	–	0	3	–	7	–	0
$ – Conference champion; ^ – NCAA Division I-AA playoff participant; The conference was a hybrid of NCAA Division I-AA and II programs. Mississippi Valley State and Prairie View were classified as NCAA Division II for the 1978 season. All the other teams were Division I-AA.; Rankings from Associated Press poll

The 1978 Mississippi Valley State Delta Devils football team represented the Mississippi Valley State University as a member of the Southwestern Athletic Conference (SWAC) during the 1978 NCAA Division II football season. Led by first-year head coach Jim Thomas, the Delta Devils compiled an overall record of 6–3–1, with a conference record of 3–2–1, and finished in third place at the SWAC.

== Schedule ==
Date	Opponent	Site	Result	Attendance	Source
September 2	at Bishop*	P.C. Cobb Stadium; Dallas, TX	W 27–0	1,000	
September 9	at Kentucky State*	Alumni Field; Frankfort, KY	L 7–21	5,186	
September 16	at Arkansas–Pine Bluff*	Pumphrey Stadium; Pine Bluff, AR	W 34–2	2,100	
September 23	at No. 4 Jackson State	Mississippi Veterans Memorial Stadium; Jackson, MS	L 16–27	23,833	
September 30	at Southern	BREC Memorial Stadium; Baton Rouge, LA	L 14–22	6,700	
October 7	Langston*	Magnolia Stadium; Itta Bena, MS	W 21–8	2,800	
October 14	Grambling State	Magnolia Stadium; Itta Bena, MS	T 0–0	5,924	
October 21	at Texas Southern	Astrodome; Houston, TX	W 38–7	3,580	
October 28	Prairie View A&M	Magnolia Stadium; Itta Bena, MS	W 42–23	4,912	
November 4	Alcorn State	Magnolia Stadium; Itta Bena, MS	W 15–7	6,012	
*Non-conference game; Rankings from AP Poll released prior to the game
