= 1978 Grambling State Tigers football team =

American college football season

1978 Grambling State Tigers football

SWAC champion

Orange Blossom Classic, L 7–31 vs. Florida A&M
- Conference: Southwestern Athletic Conference
- Record: 9–1–1 (5–0–1 SWAC)
- Head coach: Eddie Robinson (36th season)
- Home stadium: Grambling Stadium

1978 Southwestern Athletic Conference football standings
| | Conf. | | | | | Overall |
| Team | W | | L | | T | W | | L | | T |
|---|---|---|---|---|---|---|---|---|---|---|
| Grambling State $ | 5 | – | 0 | – | 1 | 9 | – | 1 | – | 1 |
| No. 2 Jackson State ^ | 5 | – | 1 | – | 0 | 10 | – | 2 | – | 0 |
| Mississippi Valley State | 3 | – | 2 | – | 1 | 6 | – | 3 | – | 1 |
| Alcorn State | 2 | – | 3 | – | 1 | 5 | – | 4 | – | 1 |
| Southern | 2 | – | 4 | – | 0 | 4 | – | 7 | – | 0 |
| Texas Southern | 1 | – | 4 | – | 1 | 3 | – | 7 | – | 1 |
| Prairie View A&M | 1 | – | 5 | – | 0 | 3 | – | 7 | – | 0 |
$ – Conference champion; ^ – NCAA Division I-AA playoff participant; The conference was a hybrid of NCAA Division I-AA and II programs. Mississippi Valley State and Prairie View were classified as NCAA Division II for the 1978 season. All the other teams were Division I-AA.; Rankings from Associated Press poll

The 1978 Grambling State Tigers football team represented Grambling State University as a member of the Southwestern Athletic Conference (SWAC) during the 1978 NCAA Division I-AA football season. Led by 36th-year head coach Eddie Robinson, the Tigers compiled an overall record of 9–1–1, with a mark of 5–0–1 in conference play, winning the SWAC title. Grambling State was invited to the Orange Blossom Classic, where they lost to Florida A&M.

== Schedule ==
| Date | Opponent | Rank | Site | Result | Attendance | Source |
|---|---|---|---|---|---|---|
| September 9 | vs. Alcorn State | | State Fair Stadium; Shreveport, LA | W 21–13 | | |
| September 23 | vs. Morgan State* | | Yankee Stadium; Bronx, NY | W 21–0 | 39,118 | |
| September 30 | vs. Prairie View A&M | No. T–10 | Cardinal Stadium; Beaumont, TX (rivalry) | W 37–6 | | |
| October 7 | Tennessee State | | Grambling Stadium; Grambling, LA | W 16–11 | | |
| October 14 | at Mississippi Valley State | | Magnolia Stadium; Itta Bena, MS | T 0–0 | 5,924 | |
| October 21 | No. 2 Jackson State | | Grambling Stadium; Grambling, LA | W 13–7 | | |
| October 28 | at Texas Southern | | Houston Astrodome; Houston, TX | W 22–16 | | |
| November 4 | vs. Langston* | | Taft Stadium; Oklahoma City, OK | W 63–6 | 4,500 | |
| November 11 | No. 4 South Carolina State* | | Grambling Stadium; Grambling, LA | W 19–15 | | |
| November 25 | vs. Southern | | Louisiana Superdome; New Orleans, LA (Bayou Classic) | W 28–15 | 75,000 | |
| December 2 | vs. No. 3 Florida A&M* | | Miami Orange Bowl; Miami, FL (Orange Blossom Classic) | L 7–31 | 35,499 | |
*Non-conference game; Rankings from Associated Press Poll released prior to the game
