= 1978 Boston University Terriers football team =

American college football season

1978 Boston University Terriers football
- Conference: Yankee Conference
- Record: 6–4 (2–3 Yankee)
- Head coach: Rick Taylor (2nd season)
- Defensive coordinator: Ed Sweeney (1st season)
- Home stadium: Nickerson Field

1978 Yankee Conference football standings
	Conf.					Overall
Team	W		L		T	W		L		T
No. T–4 UMass $^	5	–	0	–	0	9	–	4	–	0
No. 7 Rhode Island	3	–	2	–	0	7	–	3	–	0
Connecticut	3	–	2	–	0	4	–	7	–	0
Boston University	2	–	3	–	0	6	–	4	–	0
New Hampshire	1	–	3	–	1	6	–	4	–	1
Maine	0	–	4	–	1	3	–	7	–	1
$ – Conference champion; ^ – NCAA Division I-AA playoff participant; Rankings from Associated Press poll

The 1978 Boston University Terriers football team was an American football team that represented Boston University as a member of the Yankee Conference during the 1978 NCAA Division I-AA football season. In their second season under head coach Rick Taylor, the Terriers compiled a 6–4 record (2–3 against conference opponents), finished fourth in the conference, and were outscored by a total of 177 to 169.

== Schedule ==
Date	Opponent	Rank	Site	Result	Attendance	Source
September 16	Maine		Nickerson Field; Boston, MA	W 27–14		
September 23	at New Hampshire		Cowell Stadium; Durham, NH	W 15–5		
September 30	Northeastern*	No. T–10	Nickerson Field; Boston, MA	W 25–24		
October 7	at Dartmouth*	No. 5	Memorial Field; Hanover, NH	W 20–17	9,750	
October 14	UMass	No. 5	Nickerson Field; Boston, MA	L 7–31	3,570	
October 21	at Louisville*		Fairgrounds Stadium; Louisville, KY	L 7–35	15,886	
October 28	at Rhode Island	No. T–9	Meade Stadium; Kingston, RI	L 6–7	8,033	
November 4	Holy Cross*		Nickerson Field; Boston, MA	W 15–7	8,760	
November 11	at Connecticut		Memorial Stadium; Storrs, CT	L 20–27		
November 18	Bucknell*		Nickerson Field; Boston, MA	W 27–10	3,178	
*Non-conference game; Rankings from Associated Press Poll released prior to the game
