= Pioneer Bowl (1971–1982) =

Pioneer Bowl (defunct)
- Stadium: Memorial Stadium
- Location: Wichita Falls, Texas
- Operated: 1971–1978, 1981–1982

Program cover for the 1971 game

The Pioneer Bowl was an annual college football postseason game held at Memorial Stadium in Wichita Falls, Texas, from 1971 through 1978 and again in 1981 and 1982. The game originated as an NCAA College Division regional final, then became a playoff game for Division II and Division I-AA.

== History ==
The Pioneer Bowl originated as one of the four regional finals of the College Division, before it was subdivided into Division II and Division III in 1973. The game served as the championship for the Midwest Region in 1971 and 1972, at a time when there were no playoffs at any level of NCAA football. For the smaller colleges and universities, as for the major programs, the national champion was determined by polls conducted by the leading news wire services.

As Midwest Region final, the game succeeded the Pecan Bowl, which was played in Abilene, Texas from 1964 to 1967 and Arlington, Texas, from 1968 to 1970. At the time, the other three regional finals were the Boardwalk, Grantland Rice, and Camellia bowls.

The Wichita Falls Board of Commerce and Industry (BCI) secured the Pecan Bowl for the city in March 1971. The game was renamed the Pioneer Bowl after a name-the-bowl contest, with the winning entry announced in May 1971.

After the launch of Division II in 1973 and its full playoff system, the Pioneer Bowl became one of the two Division II semifinals (along with the Grantland Rice Bowl) for the first three years, and then became the championship game for two years. For the inaugural season of Division I-AA in 1978, the Pioneer Bowl became the new division's title game. Wichita Falls then retained the rights to the Pioneer Bowl name during a two-year hiatus, while the I-AA championship was decided in Florida in 1979, and in the Camellia Bowl in California in 1980. The Pioneer Bowl again hosted the I-AA title game in 1981 and 1982.

The game never quite sold out its 14,500-seat venue, though in most years the stadium was nearly full. If local press is any indication, the crowd of "only 11,257 fans" that attended the 1982 game was considered a disappointment. The bowl folded after a group from Charleston, South Carolina, outbid the Wichita Falls BCI for the next contract to host the I-AA championship.

=== In popular culture ===
"Pioneer Bowl" was used in 1993 as the name of a fictional bowl game played at the Alamodome in the television series Coach.

== Game results ==
Date played	Winning team		Losing team		Notes	NCAA playoff
December 11, 1971	Louisiana Tech	14	Eastern Michigan	3		College Division; Regional Final
December 9, 1972	Tennessee State	29	Drake	7		College Division; Regional Final
December 8, 1973	Louisiana Tech	38	Boise State	34		Division II semifinal
December 7, 1974	Central Michigan	35	Louisiana Tech	14		Division II semifinal
December 6, 1975	Northern Michigan	28	West Alabama†	26		Division II semifinal
December 11, 1976	Montana State	24	Akron	13		Division II championship
December 10, 1977	Lehigh	33	Jacksonville State	0		Division II championship
December 16, 1978	Florida A&M	35	Massachusetts	28		Division I-AA championship
December 19, 1981	Idaho State	34	Eastern Kentucky	23		Division I-AA championship
December 18, 1982	Eastern Kentucky	17	Delaware	14		Division I-AA championship

† The University of West Alabama was known as Livingston University until 1995

== See also ==
- 1978 NCAA Division I-AA Football Championship Game
- 1981 NCAA Division I-AA Football Championship Game
- 1982 NCAA Division I-AA Football Championship Game
