= 1978 NCAA Division I-AA football season =

American college football season

1978 NCAA Division I-AA season

Regular season
- Number of teams: 38
- Duration: August 2–November 25

Playoff
- Duration: December 9–December 16
- Championship date: December 16, 1978
- Championship site: Memorial Stadium; Wichita Falls, Texas
- Champion: Florida A&M

NCAA Division I-AA football seasons
- «1977 (Division I) 1979»

The 1978 NCAA Division I-AA football season was the first season of Division I-AA college football. Division I-AA was created in January 1978 when Division I was subdivided into Division I-A and Division I-AA for football only. It was anticipated that 65 Division I football schools would transition to Division I-AA. Instead, just eight programs (seven teams from the Southwestern Athletic Conference, which had just joined Division I a year before, plus independent Northwestern State) voluntarily opted for Division I-AA for the 1978 season. They were joined by 35 schools that had reclassified from Division II.

The season began in August 1978 and concluded with the Division I-AA Football Championship Game, played in the Pioneer Bowl on December 16 at Memorial Stadium in Wichita Falls, Texas. The Florida A&M Rattlers won the first I-AA championship, defeating the UMass Minutemen 35–28. Florida A&M of 1978 remains the only HBCU program to play in (and win) the I-AA/FCS national championship game.

== Initial membership ==
- The Southwestern Athletic was the only conference competing in the 1977 NCAA Division I football season to join Division I-AA in 1978.
- Four conferences, the Big Sky, Mid-Eastern Athletic, Ohio Valley, and Yankee, transitioned from Division II to Division I, classifying their football programs in Division I-AA.
- Of the eight programs moving to Division I-AA as independents, one came from Division I and seven came from Division II.

School	1977 Conference	1978 Conference
Alcorn State	SWAC (D-I)	SWAC (I-AA)
Austin Peay	Ohio Valley (D-II)	Ohio Valley (I-AA)
Boise State	Big Sky (D-II)	Big Sky (I-AA)
Boston University	Yankee (D-II)	Yankee (I-AA)
Bucknell	D-II Independent	I-AA Independent
Connecticut	Yankee (D-II)	Yankee (I-AA)
Delaware State	MEAC (D-II)	MEAC (I-AA)
Eastern Kentucky	Ohio Valley (D-II)	Ohio Valley (I-AA)
Florida A&M	SIAC (D-II)	I-AA Independent
Grambling State	SWAC (D-I)	SWAC (I-AA)
Howard	MEAC (D-II)	MEAC (I-AA)
Idaho ^	Big Sky (D-II)	Big Sky (I-AA)
Idaho State	Big Sky (D-II)	Big Sky (I-AA)
Jackson State	SWAC (D-I)	SWAC (I-AA)
Lafayette	D-II Independent	I-AA Independent
Lehigh	D-II Independent	I-AA Independent
Maine	Yankee (D-II)	Yankee (I-AA)
Middle Tennessee State	Ohio Valley (D-II)	Ohio Valley (I-AA)
Montana	Big Sky (D-II)	Big Sky (I-AA)
Montana State	Big Sky (D-II)	Big Sky (I-AA)
Morehead State	Ohio Valley (D-II)	Ohio Valley (I-AA)
Murray State	Ohio Valley (D-II)	Ohio Valley (I-AA)
New Hampshire	Yankee (D-II)	Yankee (I-AA)
Northeastern	D-II Independent	I-AA Independent
Nevada	D-II Independent	I-AA Independent
North Carolina A&T	MEAC (D-II)	MEAC (I-AA)
Northern Arizona	Big Sky (D-II)	Big Sky (I-AA)
Northwestern State	D-I Independent	I-AA Independent
Portland State	D-II Independent	I-AA Independent
Prairie View A&M	SWAC (D-I)	SWAC (I-AA)
Rhode Island	Yankee (D-II)	Yankee (I-AA)
South Carolina State	MEAC (D-II)	MEAC (I-AA)
Southern	SWAC (D-I)	SWAC (I-AA)
Tennessee Tech	Ohio Valley (D-II)	Ohio Valley (I-AA)
Texas Southern	SWAC (D-I)	SWAC (I-AA)
UMass	Yankee (D-II)	Yankee (I-AA)
Weber State	Big Sky (D-II)	Big Sky (I-AA)
Western Kentucky	Ohio Valley (D-II)	Ohio Valley (I-AA)

^ Idaho was previously in Division I for football, but also a member of the Big Sky Conference (D-II for football only)

== Conference standings ==
1978 Big Sky Conference football standings
	Conf.					Overall
Team	W		L		T	W		L		T
No. 7 Northern Arizona $	6	–	0	–	0	8	–	2	–	0
No. T–9 Montana State	4	–	2	–	0	8	–	2	–	0
Montana	4	–	2	–	0	5	–	6	–	0
Boise State	3	–	3	–	0	7	–	4	–	0
Weber State	2	–	4	–	0	4	–	7	–	0
Idaho	2	–	4	–	0	2	–	9	–	0
Idaho State	0	–	6	–	0	2	–	9	–	0
$ – Conference champion; Rankings from NCAA Division I-AA AP Poll

1978 Mid-Eastern Athletic Conference football standings
	Conf.					Overall
Team	W		L		T	W		L		T
No. 6 South Carolina State $	5	–	0	–	1	8	–	2	–	1
North Carolina A&T	4	–	2	–	0	6	–	6	–	0
Delaware State	3	–	3	–	0	3	–	7	–	0
Morgan State	2	–	3	–	1	4	–	6	–	1
Howard	2	–	4	–	0	4	–	6	–	0
Maryland Eastern Shore	2	–	4	–	0	3	–	8	–	0
North Carolina Central	2	–	4	–	0	3	–	8	–	0
$ – Conference champion; The conference was a hybrid of NCAA Division I-AA and Division II programs. Morgan State, Maryland-Eastern Shore, and North Carolina Central were classified as NCAA Division II. All the other teams were Division I-AA.; Rankings from Associated Press poll

1978 Ohio Valley Conference football standings
	Conf.					Overall
Team	W		L		T	W		L		T
No. T–4 Western Kentucky $	7	–	0	–	0	8	–	2	–	0
No. 8 Eastern Kentucky	6	–	1	–	0	8	–	2	–	0
Tennessee Tech	4	–	3	–	0	5	–	6	–	0
Austin Peay	4	–	3	–	0	6	–	4	–	0
Murray State	2	–	5	–	0	4	–	7	–	0
Morehead State	2	–	5	–	0	2	–	6	–	1
Middle Tennessee	1	–	6	–	0	1	–	9	–	1
$ – Conference champion; Rankings from Associated Press poll

1978 Southern Conference football standings
	Conf.					Overall
Team	W		L		T	W		L		T
Furman +	4	–	1	–	0	8	–	3	–	0
Chattanooga +	4	–	1	–	0	7	–	3	–	1
Appalachian State	4	–	2	–	0	7	–	4	–	0
Western Carolina	4	–	2	–	0	6	–	5	–	0
The Citadel	2	–	3	–	0	5	–	6	–	0
VMI	1	–	4	–	0	3	–	8	–	0
Marshall	0	–	5	–	0	1	–	10	–	0
Davidson	0	–	0	–	0	5	–	5	–	0
East Tennessee State	0	–	0	–	0	4	–	7	–	0
+ – Conference co-champions; The conference was a hybrid of NCAA Division I-A and I-AA teams. Davidson was classified as I-AA. All the other teams were classified as I-A. Davidson and East Tennessee State were ineligible for the conference title. VMI's games against William & Mary and Richmond and Chattanooga's game against Richmond were designated as conference games and counted in the SoCon standings.

1978 Southwestern Athletic Conference football standings
	Conf.					Overall
Team	W		L		T	W		L		T
Grambling State $	5	–	0	–	1	9	–	1	–	1
No. 2 Jackson State ^	5	–	1	–	0	10	–	2	–	0
Mississippi Valley State	3	–	2	–	1	6	–	3	–	1
Alcorn State	2	–	3	–	1	5	–	4	–	1
Southern	2	–	4	–	0	4	–	7	–	0
Texas Southern	1	–	4	–	1	3	–	7	–	1
Prairie View A&M	1	–	5	–	0	3	–	7	–	0
$ – Conference champion; ^ – NCAA Division I-AA playoff participant; The conference was a hybrid of NCAA Division I-AA and II programs. Mississippi Valley State and Prairie View were classified as NCAA Division II for the 1978 season. All the other teams were Division I-AA.; Rankings from Associated Press poll

1978 Yankee Conference football standings
	Conf.					Overall
Team	W		L		T	W		L		T
No. T–4 UMass $^	5	–	0	–	0	9	–	4	–	0
No. 7 Rhode Island	3	–	2	–	0	7	–	3	–	0
Connecticut	3	–	2	–	0	4	–	7	–	0
Boston University	2	–	3	–	0	6	–	4	–	0
New Hampshire	1	–	3	–	1	6	–	4	–	1
Maine	0	–	4	–	1	3	–	7	–	1
$ – Conference champion; ^ – NCAA Division I-AA playoff participant; Rankings from Associated Press poll

1978 NCAA Division I-AA independents football standings
	Conf.			Overall
Team	W	L	T	W		L		T
No. 1 Nevada ^		–		11	–	1	–	0
No. 9 Lehigh		–		8	–	3	–	0
Northeastern		–		6	–	5	–	0
Bucknell		–		5	–	5	–	0
Northwestern State		–		5	–	6	–	0
Portland State		–		5	–	6	–	0
Lafayette		–		4	–	7	–	0
^ – NCAA Division I-AA playoff participant; Rankings from Associated Press poll

== Conference champions ==
Conference champions

Big Sky Conference – Northern Arizona
Mid-Eastern Athletic Conference – South Carolina State
Ohio Valley Conference – Western Kentucky
Southwestern Athletic Conference – Grambling State
Yankee Conference – UMass

== Postseason ==
=== NCAA Division I-AA playoff bracket ===
The bracket consisted of three regional selections (West, East, and South) plus an at-large team. Florida A&M (FAMU) of the Southern Intercollegiate Athletic Conference (SIAC) was the at-large selection. While the SIAC was a Division II conference, FAMU had successfully petitioned the NCAA for Division I classification (Division I-AA in football), which took effect on September 1, 1978.

Semifinals; December 9 Campus sites
AtLg	Florida A&M	15
South	Jackson State*	10
East	UMass	44
West	Nevada*	21

National Championship Game; December 17; Pioneer Bowl; Memorial Stadium–Wichita Falls, TX
AtLg	Florida A&M	35
East	UMass	28

* Denotes host institution

== Notes ==
1.The Gold Bowl was a postseason game that was separate from the playoffs and took place on December 2.

== See also ==
- 1978 NCAA Division I-AA football rankings
- 1978 NCAA Division I-A football season
- 1978 NCAA Division II football season
- 1978 NCAA Division III football season
- 1978 NAIA Division I football season
- 1978 NAIA Division II football season
