= 1978 NCAA Division I-AA football rankings =

The 1978 NCAA Division I-AA football rankings are from the Associated Press. This is for the 1978 season.

== Legend ==
	Increase in ranking
	Decrease in ranking
	Not ranked previous week
(#–#)	Win–loss record
(Italics)	Number of first place votes
т	Tied with team above or below also with this symbol

== Associated Press Poll ==
	Week 1 Sept 20	Week 2 Sept 27	Week 3 Oct 4	Week 4 Oct 11	Week 5 Oct 18	Week 6 Oct 25	Week 7 Nov 1	Week 8 Nov 8	Week 9 Nov 15	Week 10 Nov 22	
1.	Lehigh (2–0) т	Lehigh (3–0)	South Carolina State (5–0)	South Carolina State (6–0)	Montana State (6–0)	Montana State (7–0)	Nevada (8–0)	Nevada (9–0)	Nevada (10–0)	Nevada (11–0)	1.
2.	South Carolina State (3–0) т	South Carolina State (4–0)	Montana State (4–0)	Montana State (5–0)	Jackson State (6–0)	Nevada (7–0)	Jackson State (7–1)	Jackson State (8–1)	Jackson State (9–1)	Jackson State (10–1)	2.
3.	Boise State (2–0)	Boise State (3–0)	Nevada (4–0)	Nevada (5–0)	Nevada (6–0)	Lehigh (6–1)	Florida A&M (6–1)	Florida A&M (7–1)	Florida A&M (7–1)	Florida A&M (8–1)	3.
4.	Jackson State (3–0)	Nevada (3–0)	Jackson State (4–0)	Jackson State (5–0)	Florida A&M (5–0)	Jackson State (6–1)	UMass (5–2) т	South Carolina State (8–1–1)	Western Kentucky (7–2)	UMass (7–3) т	4.
5.	Nevada (2–0)	Jackson State (4–0)	Boston University (3–0)	Boston University (4–0)	Lehigh (5–1)	Florida A&M (5–1)	South Carolina State (7–1–1) т	Western Kentucky (7–2) т	Northern Arizona (7–2)	Western Kentucky (8–2) т	5.
6.	Montana State (2–0)	Montana State (3–0)	Lehigh (3–1)	Lehigh (4–1)	South Carolina State (6–0–1)	UMass (4–2)	Montana State (7–1) т	Lehigh (7–2) т	South Carolina State (8–2–1)	South Carolina State (8–2–1)	6.
7.	Florida A&M (1–0)	Florida A&M (2–0)	Florida A&M (3–0)	Florida A&M (4–0)	Eastern Kentucky (4–1)	South Carolina State (6–1–1)	Western Kentucky (6–2)	Northern Arizona (6–2)	Rhode Island (7–2)	Northern Arizona (8–2)	7.
8.	Northwestern State (2–0) (Note: In the actual printed polls, Northwestern State was listed as Northwestern Louisiana)	Northwestern State (3–0)	Boise State (3–1)	Eastern Kentucky (3–1)	Rhode Island (4–1)	Western Kentucky (5–2)	Lehigh (6–2)	Eastern Kentucky (6–2)	Eastern Kentucky (7–2)	Eastern Kentucky (8–2)	8.
9.	Northern Arizona (2–1)	Northern Arizona (3–1)	Northern Arizona (4–1)	Northern Arizona (5–1)	Northern Arizona (5–1)	Eastern Kentucky (4–2) т	Eastern Kentucky (5–2)	Boise State (7–2) т	UMass (6–3)	Lehigh (8–3) т	9.
10.	Austin Peay (1–0)	Boston University (2–0) т	Rhode Island (2–1) т	Rhode Island (3–1)	UMass (3–2) (Note: In the actual printed polls, UMass was listed as Massachusetts)	Boston University (4–2) т	Northern Arizona (6–2)	Rhode Island (6–2) т	Montana State (8–2)	Rhode Island (7–3) т	10.
11.		Grambling State (2–0) т	Western Kentucky (4–0) т							Montana State (8–2) т	11.
12.			Eastern Kentucky (4–0) т								12.
	Week 1 Sept 20	Week 2 Sept 27	Week 3 Oct 4	Week 4 Oct 11	Week 5 Oct 18	Week 6 Oct 25	Week 7 Nov 1	Week 8 Nov 8	Week 9 Nov 15	Week 10 Nov 22	
		Dropped: 10 Austin Peay	Dropped: 8 Northwestern State; 11 Grambling State	Dropped: 8 Boise State; 11 Western Kentucky	Dropped: 5 Boston University	Dropped: 8 Rhode Island; 9 Northern Arizona	Dropped: 10 Boston University	Dropped: 4 UMass; 6 Montana State	Dropped: 6 Lehigh; 9 Boise State	None	
