= 1978 Davidson Wildcats football team =

American college football season

1978 Davidson Wildcats football
- Conference: Southern Conference
- Record: 5–5 (0–0 SoCon)
- Head coach: Ed Farrell (5th season)
- Home stadium: Richardson Stadium

1978 Southern Conference football standings
	Conf.					Overall
Team	W		L		T	W		L		T
Furman +	4	–	1	–	0	8	–	3	–	0
Chattanooga +	4	–	1	–	0	7	–	3	–	1
Appalachian State	4	–	2	–	0	7	–	4	–	0
Western Carolina	4	–	2	–	0	6	–	5	–	0
The Citadel	2	–	3	–	0	5	–	6	–	0
VMI	1	–	4	–	0	3	–	8	–	0
Marshall	0	–	5	–	0	1	–	10	–	0
Davidson	0	–	0	–	0	5	–	5	–	0
East Tennessee State	0	–	0	–	0	4	–	7	–	0
+ – Conference co-champions; The conference was a hybrid of NCAA Division I-A and I-AA teams. Davidson was classified as I-AA. All the other teams were classified as I-A. Davidson and East Tennessee State were ineligible for the conference title. VMI's games against William & Mary and Richmond and Chattanooga's game against Richmond were designated as conference games and counted in the SoCon standings.

The 1978 Davidson Wildcats football team represented Davidson College as a member of the Southern Conference (SoCon) during the 1978 NCAA Division I-AA football season. Led by fifth-year head coach Ed Farrell, the Wildcats compiled an overall record of 5–5. Davidson was ineligible for the SoCon title and the team's games against conference opponents did not count in the SoCon standings.

== Schedule ==
Date	Opponent	Site	Result	Attendance	Source
September 9	Fordham*	Richardson Stadium; Davidson, NC	L 14–30	3,700	
September 16	at Washington and Lee*	Wilson Field; Lexington, VA	W 34–7	4,000	
September 23	Wofford*	Richardson Stadium; Davidson, NC	W 31–27		
September 30	Bucknell*	Richardson Stadium; Davidson, NC	L 20–21	4,500	
October 7	at Randolph–Macon*	Day Field; Ashland, VA	W 42–0	1,200	
October 14	at Lehigh*	Taylor Stadium; Bethlehem, PA	L 21–27	9,000	
October 21	at Hampden–Sydney*	Hampden-Sydney, VA	W 23–14	5,000	
October 28	vs. Guilford*	American Legion Memorial Stadium; Charlotte, NC	L 35–42		
November 4	at Furman*	Sirrine Stadium; Greenville, SC	L 14–56	13,122	
November 11	Lafayette*	Richardson Stadium; Davidson, NC	W 17–12	2,000	
*Non-conference game
