= 1978 Furman Paladins football team =

American college football season

1978 Furman Paladins football

SoCon co-champion
- Conference: Southern Conference
- Record: 8–3 (4–1 SoCon)
- Head coach: Dick Sheridan (1st season)
- Captains: Russell Gambrell; Brette Simmons; Greg Laetsch
- Home stadium: Sirrine Stadium

1978 Southern Conference football standings
	Conf.					Overall
Team	W		L		T	W		L		T
Furman +	4	–	1	–	0	8	–	3	–	0
Chattanooga +	4	–	1	–	0	7	–	3	–	1
Appalachian State	4	–	2	–	0	7	–	4	–	0
Western Carolina	4	–	2	–	0	6	–	5	–	0
The Citadel	2	–	3	–	0	5	–	6	–	0
VMI	1	–	4	–	0	3	–	8	–	0
Marshall	0	–	5	–	0	1	–	10	–	0
Davidson	0	–	0	–	0	5	–	5	–	0
East Tennessee State	0	–	0	–	0	4	–	7	–	0
+ – Conference co-champions; The conference was a hybrid of NCAA Division I-A and I-AA teams. Davidson was classified as I-AA. All the other teams were classified as I-A. Davidson and East Tennessee State were ineligible for the conference title. VMI's games against William & Mary and Richmond and Chattanooga's game against Richmond were designated as conference games and counted in the SoCon standings.

The 1978 Furman Paladins football team was an American football team that represented Furman University as a member of the Southern Conference (SoCon) during the 1978 NCAA Division I-A football season. In their first year under head coach Dick Sheridan, the Paladins compiled an overall record of 8–3 with a conference mark of 4–1, sharing the SoCon title with Chattanooga.

== Schedule ==
Date	Opponent	Site	Result	Attendance	Source
September 9	at South Carolina*	Williams–Brice Stadium; Columbia, SC	L 10–45	50,239	
September 16	Carson–Newman*	Sirrine Stadium; Greenville, SC	W 31–14		
September 23	at Vanderbilt*	Dudley Field; Nashville, TN	L 10–17	25,000	
September 30	at Appalachian State	Conrad Stadium; Boone, NC	W 52–34	13,150	
October 7	Wofford*	Sirrine Stadium; Greenville, SC (rivalry)	W 36–12	8,500	
October 14	at East Tennessee State*	Memorial Center; Johnson City, TN	W 35–14	8,951	
October 21	Chattanooga	Sirrine Stadium; Greenville, SC	L 9–13	7,618	
October 28	at Marshall	Fairfield Stadium; Huntington, WV	W 42–12		
November 4	Davidson*	Sirrine Stadium; Greenville, SC	W 56–14	13,122	
November 11	at Western Carolina	Whitmire Stadium; Cullowhee, NC	W 24–7		
November 18	The Citadel	Sirrine Stadium; Greenville, SC (rivalry)	W 17–13	13,312	
*Non-conference game
