= 1978 Chattanooga Moccasins football team =

American college football season

1978 Chattanooga Moccasins football

SoCon co-champion
- Conference: Southern Conference
- Record: 7–3–1 (3–1 SoCon)
- Head coach: Joe Morrison (6th season)
- Captain: Game captains
- Home stadium: Chamberlain Field

1978 Southern Conference football standings
	Conf.					Overall
Team	W		L		T	W		L		T
Furman +	4	–	1	–	0	8	–	3	–	0
Chattanooga +	4	–	1	–	0	7	–	3	–	1
Appalachian State	4	–	2	–	0	7	–	4	–	0
Western Carolina	4	–	2	–	0	6	–	5	–	0
The Citadel	2	–	3	–	0	5	–	6	–	0
VMI	1	–	4	–	0	3	–	8	–	0
Marshall	0	–	5	–	0	1	–	10	–	0
Davidson	0	–	0	–	0	5	–	5	–	0
East Tennessee State	0	–	0	–	0	4	–	7	–	0
+ – Conference co-champions; The conference was a hybrid of NCAA Division I-A and I-AA teams. Davidson was classified as I-AA. All the other teams were classified as I-A. Davidson and East Tennessee State were ineligible for the conference title. VMI's games against William & Mary and Richmond and Chattanooga's game against Richmond were designated as conference games and counted in the SoCon standings.

The 1978 Chattanooga Moccasins football team represented the University of Tennessee at Chattanooga as a member of the Southern Conference (SoCon) during the 1978 NCAA Division I-A football season. Led by first-year head coach Joe Morrison, the Moccasins compiled an overall record of 7–3–1 overall with a mark of 4–1 conference play, sharing the SoCon title with Furman. The team played home games at Chamberlain Field in Chattanooga, Tennessee.

== Schedule ==
Date	Opponent	Site	Result	Attendance	Source
September 9	at Western Kentucky*	L. T. Smith Stadium; Bowling Green, KY	W 42–15	13,500	
September 16	at Louisiana Tech*	Joe Aillet Stadium; Ruston, LA	W 12–7	14,212	
September 23	at Marshall	Fairfield Stadium; Huntington, WV	W 27–23		
September 30	at Middle Tennessee State*	Horace Jones Field; Murfreesboro, TN	T 14–14	3,800	
October 7	Appalachian State	Chamberlain Field; Chattanooga, TN	W 72–14	10,501	
October 14	No. 9 Jacksonville State*^{†}	Chamberlain Field; Chattanooga, TN	W 28–21	10,501	
October 21	at Furman	Sirrine Stadium; Greenville, SC	W 13–9	7,618	
October 28	at McNeese State*	Cowboy Stadium; Lake Charles, LA	L 24–28		
November 4	Western Carolina	Chamberlain Field; Chattanooga, TN	L 21–31	10,000	
November 11	Richmond (Note: Chattanooga's game against Richmond was designated as a conference game and counted in the SoCon standings.)	Chamberlain Field; Chattanooga, TN	W 30–3		
November 18	at Tennessee State*	Hale Stadium; Nashville, TN	L 23–27	10,000	
*Non-conference game; ^{†}Homecoming; Rankings from AP Poll released prior to the game
