= 1978 Western Carolina Catamounts football team =

American college football season

1978 Western Carolina Catamounts football
- Conference: Southern Conference
- Record: 6–5 (4–2 SoCon)
- Head coach: Bob Waters (10th season)
- Home stadium: E. J. Whitmire Stadium

1978 Southern Conference football standings
	Conf.					Overall
Team	W		L		T	W		L		T
Furman +	4	–	1	–	0	8	–	3	–	0
Chattanooga +	4	–	1	–	0	7	–	3	–	1
Appalachian State	4	–	2	–	0	7	–	4	–	0
Western Carolina	4	–	2	–	0	6	–	5	–	0
The Citadel	2	–	3	–	0	5	–	6	–	0
VMI	1	–	4	–	0	3	–	8	–	0
Marshall	0	–	5	–	0	1	–	10	–	0
Davidson	0	–	0	–	0	5	–	5	–	0
East Tennessee State	0	–	0	–	0	4	–	7	–	0
+ – Conference co-champions; The conference was a hybrid of NCAA Division I-A and I-AA teams. Davidson was classified as I-AA. All the other teams were classified as I-A. Davidson and East Tennessee State were ineligible for the conference title. VMI's games against William & Mary and Richmond and Chattanooga's game against Richmond were designated as conference games and counted in the SoCon standings.

The 1978 Western Carolina Catamounts team was an American football team that represented Western Carolina University as a member of the Southern Conference (SoCon) during the 1978 NCAA Division I-A football season. In their 10th year under head coach Bob Waters, the team compiled an overall record of 6–5, with a mark of 4–2 in conference play, tying for third place in the SoCon.

== Schedule ==
Date	Opponent	Site	Result	Attendance	Source
September 2	at East Carolina*	Ficklen Memorial Stadium; Greenville, NC	L 6–14	31,251	
September 9	at Tennessee Tech*	Tucker Stadium; Cookeville, TN	L 20–22		
September 16	at East Tennessee State*	Memorial Center; Johnson City, TN	L 14–21	5,269	
September 23	Elon*	E. J. Whitmire Stadium; Cullowhee, NC	W 17–7	9,315	
September 30	Marshall	E. J. Whitmire Stadium; Cullowhee, NC	W 21–14	7,645	
October 14	The Citadel	E. J. Whitmire Stadium; Cullowhee, NC	W 38–24		
October 21	at Wofford*	Snyder Field; Spartanburg, SC	W 26–11	4,300	
October 28	at VMI	Alumni Memorial Field; Lexington, VA	W 41–12		
November 4	at Chattanooga	Chamberlain Field; Chattanooga, TN	W 31–21	10,000	
November 11	Furman	E. J. Whitmire Stadium; Cullowhee, NC	L 7–24		
November 18	Appalachian State	E. J. Whitmire Stadium; Cullowhee, NC (rivalry)	L 13–39	12,232	
*Non-conference game
