= 1978 East Tennessee State Buccaneers football team =

American college football season

1978 East Tennessee State Buccaneers football
- Conference: Southern Conference
- Record: 4–7 (0–0 SoCon)
- Head coach: Jack Carlisle (1st season)
- Home stadium: Memorial Center

1978 Southern Conference football standings
	Conf.					Overall
Team	W		L		T	W		L		T
Furman +	4	–	1	–	0	8	–	3	–	0
Chattanooga +	4	–	1	–	0	7	–	3	–	1
Appalachian State	4	–	2	–	0	7	–	4	–	0
Western Carolina	4	–	2	–	0	6	–	5	–	0
The Citadel	2	–	3	–	0	5	–	6	–	0
VMI	1	–	4	–	0	3	–	8	–	0
Marshall	0	–	5	–	0	1	–	10	–	0
Davidson	0	–	0	–	0	5	–	5	–	0
East Tennessee State	0	–	0	–	0	4	–	7	–	0
+ – Conference co-champions; The conference was a hybrid of NCAA Division I-A and I-AA teams. Davidson was classified as I-AA. All the other teams were classified as I-A. Davidson and East Tennessee State were ineligible for the conference title. VMI's games against William & Mary and Richmond and Chattanooga's game against Richmond were designated as conference games and counted in the SoCon standings.

The 1978 East Tennessee State Buccaneers football team represented East Tennessee State University as a member of the Southern Conference (SoCon) during the 1978 NCAA Division I-A football season. Led by first-year head coach Jack Carlisle, the Buccaneers compiled an overall record of 4–7. East Tennessee State was ineligible for the SoCon title and the team's games against conference opponents did not count in the SoCon standings.

== Schedule ==
Date	Opponent	Site	Result	Attendance	Source
September 9	Mississippi College*	Memorial Center; Johnson City, TN	L 3–17		
September 16	Western Carolina*	Memorial Center; Johnson City, TN	W 21–14	5,269	
September 23	at Eastern Kentucky*	Hanger Field; Richmond, KY	L 6–49	13,200	
September 30	Western Kentucky*	Memorial Center; Johnson City, TN	L 21–27	5,732	
October 7	Tennessee Tech*	Memorial Center; Johnson City, TN	W 38–17	4,866	
October 14	Furman*	Memorial Center; Johnson City, TN	L 14–35	8,951	
October 21	at Murray State*	Roy Stewart Stadium; Murray, KY	L 21–34		
October 28	at Appalachian State	Conrad Stadium; Boone, NC	W 35–34	14,471	
November 4	Morehead State*	Memorial Center; Johnson City, TN	L 30–31		
November 11	at Middle Tennessee*	Horace Jones Field; Murfreesboro, TN	W 34–0		
November 18	Austin Peay*	Memorial Center; Johnson City, TN	L 7–14		
*Non-conference game
