= 1978 Appalachian State Mountaineers football team =

American college football season

1978 Appalachian State Mountaineers football
- Conference: Southern Conference
- Record: 7–4 (4–2 SoCon)
- Head coach: Jim Brakefield (8th season)
- Home stadium: Conrad Stadium

1978 Southern Conference football standings
| | Conf. | | | | | Overall |
| Team | W | | L | | T | W | | L | | T |
|---|---|---|---|---|---|---|---|---|---|---|
| Furman + | 4 | – | 1 | – | 0 | 8 | – | 3 | – | 0 |
| Chattanooga + | 4 | – | 1 | – | 0 | 7 | – | 3 | – | 1 |
| Appalachian State | 4 | – | 2 | – | 0 | 7 | – | 4 | – | 0 |
| Western Carolina | 4 | – | 2 | – | 0 | 6 | – | 5 | – | 0 |
| The Citadel | 2 | – | 3 | – | 0 | 5 | – | 6 | – | 0 |
| VMI | 1 | – | 4 | – | 0 | 3 | – | 8 | – | 0 |
| Marshall | 0 | – | 5 | – | 0 | 1 | – | 10 | – | 0 |
| Davidson | 0 | – | 0 | – | 0 | 5 | – | 5 | – | 0 |
| East Tennessee State | 0 | – | 0 | – | 0 | 4 | – | 7 | – | 0 |
+ – Conference co-champions; The conference was a hybrid of NCAA Division I-A and I-AA teams. Davidson was classified as I-AA. All the other teams were classified as I-A. Davidson and East Tennessee State were ineligible for the conference title. VMI's games against William & Mary and Richmond and Chattanooga's game against Richmond were designated as conference games and counted in the SoCon standings.

The 1978 Appalachian State Mountaineers football team was an American football team that represented Appalachian State University as a member of the Southern Conference (SoCon) during the 1978 NCAA Division I-A football season. In their eighth year under head coach Jim Brakefield, the Mountaineers compiled an overall record of 7–4 with a mark of 4–2 in conference play, and finished third in the SoCon.

== Schedule ==
| Date | Opponent | Site | Result | Attendance | Source |
|---|---|---|---|---|---|
| September 9 | Wofford* | Conrad Stadium; Boone, NC | W 35–14 | 11,250 | |
| September 16 | at Marshall | Fairfield Stadium; Huntington, WV (rivalry) | W 28–7 | 15,768 | |
| September 23 | Richmond* | Conrad Stadium; Boone, NC | W 24–19 | 8,416 | |
| September 30 | Furman | Conrad Stadium; Boone, NC | L 34–52 | 13,150 | |
| October 7 | at Chattanooga | Chamberlain Field; Chattanooga, TN | L 14–72 | 10,501 | |
| October 14 | at Lenoir–Rhyne* | Moretz Stadium; Hickory, NC | W 49–28 | 7,500 | |
| October 21 | The Citadel | Conrad Stadium; Boone, NC | W 42–14 | 11,130 | |
| October 28 | East Tennessee State* | Conrad Stadium; Boone, NC | L 34–35 | 14,471 | |
| November 4 | at East Carolina* | Ficklen Memorial Stadium; Greenville, NC | L 8–33 | 19,726 | |
| November 11 | at VMI | Alumni Memorial Field; Lexington, VA | W 31–10 | 4,600 | |
| November 18 | at Western Carolina | Whitmire Stadium; Cullowhee, NC (rivalry) | W 39–13 | 12,232 | |
*Non-conference game
