= 1978 Marshall Thundering Herd football team =

American college football season

1978 Marshall Thundering Herd football
- Conference: Southern Conference
- Record: 1–10 (0–5 SoCon)
- Head coach: Frank Ellwood (4th season)
- Defensive coordinator: Carlin B. Carpenter (4th season)
- Home stadium: Fairfield Stadium

1978 Southern Conference football standings
	Conf.					Overall
Team	W		L		T	W		L		T
Furman +	4	–	1	–	0	8	–	3	–	0
Chattanooga +	4	–	1	–	0	7	–	3	–	1
Appalachian State	4	–	2	–	0	7	–	4	–	0
Western Carolina	4	–	2	–	0	6	–	5	–	0
The Citadel	2	–	3	–	0	5	–	6	–	0
VMI	1	–	4	–	0	3	–	8	–	0
Marshall	0	–	5	–	0	1	–	10	–	0
Davidson	0	–	0	–	0	5	–	5	–	0
East Tennessee State	0	–	0	–	0	4	–	7	–	0
+ – Conference co-champions; The conference was a hybrid of NCAA Division I-A and I-AA teams. Davidson was classified as I-AA. All the other teams were classified as I-A. Davidson and East Tennessee State were ineligible for the conference title. VMI's games against William & Mary and Richmond and Chattanooga's game against Richmond were designated as conference games and counted in the SoCon standings.

The 1978 Marshall Thundering Herd football team was an American football team that represented Marshall University in the Southern Conference (SoCon) during the 1978 NCAA Division I-A football season. In its fourth season under head coach Frank Ellwood, the team compiled a 1–10 record (0–5 against conference opponents) and was outscored by a total of 292 to 113. The team played its home games at Fairfield Stadium in Huntington, West Virginia.

== Schedule ==
Date	Opponent	Site	Result	Attendance	Source
September 9	at Toledo*	Glass Bowl; Toledo, OH	W 17–0		
September 16	Appalachian State	Fairfield Stadium; Huntington, WV (rivalry)	L 7–28	15,768	
September 23	Chattanooga	Fairfield Stadium; Huntington, WV	L 23–27		
September 30	at Western Carolina	E. J. Whitmire Stadium; Cullowhee, NC	L 14–21	7,645	
October 7	at The Citadel	Johnson Hagood Stadium; Charleston, SC	L 0–41	14,100	
October 14	Miami (OH)*^{†}	Fairfield Stadium; Huntington, WV	L 3–29	12,221	
October 21	at Kent State*	Dix Stadium; Kent, OH	L 17–20	5,418	
October 28	Furman	Fairfield Stadium; Huntington, WV	L 12–42		
November 4	Western Michigan*	Fairfield Stadium; Huntington, WV	L 6–24	10,000	
November 11	at Southern Illinois*	McAndrew Stadium; Carbondale, IL	L 14–15	7,110	
November 18	at East Carolina*	Ficklen Memorial Stadium; Greenville, NC (rivalry)	L 0–45	22,450	
*Non-conference game; ^{†}Homecoming
