= 1978 Clemson Tigers football team =

American college football season

1978 Clemson Tigers football

ACC champion Gator Bowl champion

Gator Bowl, W 17–15 vs. Ohio State
- Conference: Atlantic Coast Conference

Ranking
- Coaches: No. 7
- AP: No. 6
- Record: 11–1 (6–0 ACC)
- Head coach: Charley Pell (2nd season; regular season); Danny Ford (bowl game)
- Offensive coordinator: Jimmye Laycock (2nd season)
- Defensive coordinator: Mickey Andrews (2nd season)
- Captains: Steve Fuller; Randy Scott
- Home stadium: Memorial Stadium

1978 Atlantic Coast Conference football standings
	Conf.					Overall
Team	W		L		T	W		L		T
No. 6 Clemson $	6	–	0	–	0	11	–	1	–	0
No. 20 Maryland	5	–	1	–	0	9	–	3	–	0
No. 18 NC State	4	–	2	–	0	9	–	3	–	0
North Carolina	3	–	3	–	0	5	–	6	–	0
Duke	2	–	4	–	0	4	–	7	–	0
Wake Forest	1	–	5	–	0	1	–	10	–	0
Virginia	0	–	6	–	0	2	–	9	–	0
$ – Conference champion; Rankings from AP Poll

The 1978 Clemson Tigers football team was an American football team that represented Clemson University in the Atlantic Coast Conference (ACC) during the 1978 NCAA Division I-A football season. In its second season under head coach Charley Pell, the team compiled an 11–1 record (6–0 against conference opponents), won the ACC championship, defeated Ohio State in the 1978 Gator Bowl, was ranked No. 6 in the final AP and Coaches Polls, and outscored opponents by a total of 368 to 131. The team played its home games at Memorial Stadium in Clemson, South Carolina.

Steve Fuller and Randy Scott were the team captains. The team's statistical leaders included Steve Fuller with 1,515 passing yards, Lester Brown with 1,022 rushing yards and 102 points scored, and Jerry Butler with 908 receiving yards.

The Gator Bowl victory became infamous because Ohio State's legendary head coach Woody Hayes punched Clemson player Charlie Bauman during the game on the Buckeyes sideline after a play. The incident was caught on live television, and Hayes resigned as Ohio State head coach the next day before the team even left Jacksonville. Hayes would never coach again.

== Schedule ==
Date	Time	Opponent	Rank	Site	Result	Attendance	Source
September 16	1:00 p.m.	The Citadel*		Memorial Stadium; Clemson, SC	W 58–3	53,332–54,075	
September 23	1:30 p.m.	at Georgia*		Sanford Stadium; Athens, GA (rivalry)	L 0–12	60,000	
September 30	1:00 p.m.	Villanova*		Memorial Stadium; Clemson, SC	W 31–0	47,786	
October 7	1:00 p.m.	Virginia Tech*^{†}		Memorial Stadium; Clemson, SC	W 38–7	53,054	
October 14	1:00 p.m.	at Virginia		Scott Stadium; Charlottesville, VA	W 30–14	19,243	
October 21	1:00 p.m.	Duke		Memorial Stadium; Clemson, SC	W 28–8	51,109	
October 28	1:00 p.m.	at NC State	No. 20	Carter Stadium; Raleigh, NC (rivalry)	W 33–10	45,000	
November 4	1:30 p.m.	at Wake Forest	No. 16	Groves Stadium; Winston-Salem, NC	W 51–6	30,400	
November 11	1:00 p.m.	North Carolina	No. 15	Memorial Stadium; Clemson, SC	W 13–9	53,495	
November 18	1:00 p.m.	at No. 11 Maryland	No. 12	Byrd Stadium; College Park, MD	W 28–24	51,376	
November 25	1:00 p.m.	South Carolina*	No. 10	Memorial Stadium; Clemson, SC (rivalry)	W 41–23	63,050–63,479	
December 29		vs. No. 20 Ohio State*	No. 7	Gator Bowl Stadium; Jacksonville, FL (Gator Bowl)	W 17–15	72,011	
*Non-conference game; ^{†}Homecoming; Rankings from AP Poll released prior to the game; All times are in Eastern time

== Game summaries ==
=== Gator Bowl (vs. Ohio State) ===
Gator Bowl: #7 Clemson Tigers (10–1) vs. #20 Ohio State Buckeyes (7–3–1)

Quarter	1	2	3	4	Total
Ohio St	0	9	0	6	15
Clemson	0	10	7	0	17

at Gator Bowl, Jacksonville, Florida

- Date: December 29, 1978
- Game time: 9:00 p.m. EST
- Game attendance: 72,011
- Referee: Jim Artley
- TV: ABC
- Box Score

Game information

Second quarter

- OSU – Bob Atha 27-yard field goal, 12:08. Ohio St 3–0. Drive: 8 plays, 72 yards.
- CLEM – Steve Fuller 4-yard run (Obed Ariri kick), 5:03. Clemson 7–3. Drive: 15 plays, 80 yards.
- OSU – Art Schlichter 4-yard run (kick failed), 1:21. Ohio St 9–7. Drive: 9 plays, 78 yards.
- CLEM – Obed Ariri 47-yard field goal, 0:05. Clemson 10–9. Drive: 8 plays, 76 yards.

Third quarter

- CLEM – Cliff Austin 1-yard run (Ariri kick), 2:18. Clemson 17–9. Drive: 19 plays, 84 yards.

Fourth quarter

- OSU – Art Schlichter 1-yard run (run failed), 8:11. Clemson 17–15. Drive: 12 plays, 87 yards.

Top passers

- OSU – Art Schlichter – 16/20, 205 yards, INT
- CLEM – Steve Fuller – 9/20, 123 yards

Top rushers

- OSU – Art Schlichter – 18 rushes, 70 yards, 2 TD
- CLEM – Tracy Perry – 14 rushes, 54 yards

Warren Ratchford – 10 rushes, 54 yards

Top receivers

- OSU – Doug Donley – 3 receptions, 54 yards
- CLEM – Jerry Butler – 4 receptions, 44 yards

== Personnel ==
1978 Clemson Tigers football team roster
Players
Coaches
Offense

Pos.	#	Name	Class
TE	82	Ed Abreu	Fr
RB	7	Cliff Austin	Fr
RB	40	Rick Basich	Jr
OL	55	Jeff Bostic	Jr
OL	71	Joe Bostic	Sr
TE	86	Cliff Bray	Sr
RB	44	Lester Brown	Jr
WR	15	Jerry Butler	Sr
WR	30	Dwight Clark	Sr
TE	87	Mark Clifford	Jr
OL	50	Chris Dulce	Jr
QB	4	Steve Fuller	Sr
WR	41	Jerry Gaillard	Fr
QB	11	Mike Gasque	So
RB	32	Harold Goggins	Sr
WR	14	JD Haglan	Sr
OL	74	Bill Hudson	Sr
OL	53	Steve Kenney	Sr
TE	88	Anthony King	Sr
QB	8	Billy Lott	Jr
OL	65	Lee Nanney	Fr
RB	46	Tracy Perry	Jr
RB	2	Warren Ratchford	Sr
RB	31	Marvin Sims	Jr
OL	64	Mark Thornton	Jr
WR	22	Perry Tuttle	Fr
RB	23	Paul Williams	Fr
WR	27	Eric Young	Jr

Defense

Pos.	#	Name	Class
DL	58	Charlie Bauman	So
DL	84	Jonathan Brooks	Sr
LB	47	Bubba Brown	Jr
DB	12	Jack Cain	So
DL	66	Steve Durham	So
DB	49	Eddie Geathers	So
DL	80	Steve Gibbs	Sr
DB	5	Willie Jordan	Sr
DB	3	Al Latimer	Sr
DL	90	David Reed	So
DB	17	Bubba Rollins	Sr
DB	26	Steve Ryan	Sr
LB	35	Randy Scott	Sr
DL	83	Jim Stuckey	Jr
DL	51	Rich Tuten	Sr
DB	13	Rex Varn	Jr
DL	76	Toney Williams	Sr

Special teams

Pos.	#	Name	Class
K	1	Obed Ariri	Jr
P	39	David Sims	So

Head coach

- Charley Pell

Coordinators/assistant coaches

- Danny Ford (OL)

Legend

- (C) Team captain
- (S) Suspended
- (I) Ineligible
- Injured
- Redshirt

Roster
