= 1978 Sun Bowl =

American college football game

- 45th Sun Bowl
Maryland Terrapins	Texas Longhorns
(9–2)	(8–3)
ACC	SWC
0	42
Head coach: Jerry Claiborne	Head coach: Fred Akers
AP / Coaches; 13 / 12	AP / Coaches; 14 / 14
	1	2	3	4	Total
Maryland	0	0	0	0	0
Texas	21	7	14	0	42
- Date: December 23, 1978
- Season: 1978
- Stadium: Sun Bowl
- Location: El Paso, Texas
- MVP: RB Lam Jones (Texas)
- Referee: Vance Carlson (Big 8)
- Attendance: 33,122

United States TV coverage
- Network: CBS
- Announcers: Pat Summerall; Tom Brookshier

The 1978 Sun Bowl was a college football bowl game that featured the Texas Longhorns and the Maryland Terrapins.

== Background ==
The Longhorns went from being one game away from a title the previous year to finishing second in the Southwest Conference. The Terrapins finished second in the Atlantic Coast Conference and made their sixth straight bowl appearance. This was the first Sun Bowl for both teams.

== Game summary ==
The Longhorns had almost as much rushing yards as Maryland had in total yards, demolishing the Terrapin defense and leading 28–0 at halftime. Lam Jones and A.J. Jones (no relation) traded rushing touchdowns, and Mark McBaeth threw a touchdown pass to Lam to make it 21–0 by the time the first quarter ended, in part due to the 33 yard average on the three punts Maryland did in the quarter. A fumbled kickoff return by Maryland gave the ball to Texas early in the second quarter, and McBaeth added a touchdown run of his own to make it 28–0. In the third quarter, a 16-yard punt by the Terrapins set up another Longhorn opportunity. A.J. Jones added in his second touchdown of the day to make it 35–0. A Johnnie Johnson interception gave the ball back to the Longhorns again. Ham Jones scored from 35 yards out to make it 42–0 two plays later. After that, the scoring stopped, as the Longhorns cruised to victory.

The attendance for the game was 33,122.

== Aftermath ==
The Terps returned to the Sun Bowl in 1984, while the Longhorns returned in 1979.

== Statistics ==
Statistics	Maryland	Texas
First downs	20	18
Rushing yards	34	220
Passing yards	214	45
Total yards	248	285
Comp-Att-Int	17–43–4	2–7–0
Return yards	0	20
Punts–average	8–37	7–41
Fumbles–lost	2–1	3–1
Penalties–yards	5–35	7–42
