= 1978 North Carolina Tar Heels football team =

American college football season

1978 North Carolina Tar Heels football
- Conference: Atlantic Coast Conference
- Record: 5–6 (3–3 ACC)
- Head coach: Dick Crum (1st season)
- Captains: Bernie Menapace; Bunn Rhames; Mike Salzano
- Home stadium: Kenan Memorial Stadium

1978 Atlantic Coast Conference football standings
	Conf.					Overall
Team	W		L		T	W		L		T
No. 6 Clemson $	6	–	0	–	0	11	–	1	–	0
No. 20 Maryland	5	–	1	–	0	9	–	3	–	0
No. 18 NC State	4	–	2	–	0	9	–	3	–	0
North Carolina	3	–	3	–	0	5	–	6	–	0
Duke	2	–	4	–	0	4	–	7	–	0
Wake Forest	1	–	5	–	0	1	–	10	–	0
Virginia	0	–	6	–	0	2	–	9	–	0
$ – Conference champion; Rankings from AP Poll

The 1978 North Carolina Tar Heels football team represented the University of North Carolina at Chapel Hill during the 1978 NCAA Division I-A football season. The Tar Heels were led by first-year head coach Dick Crum and played their home games at Kenan Memorial Stadium in Chapel Hill, North Carolina. They competed as members of the Atlantic Coast Conference, finishing in fourth.

== Schedule ==
Date	Time	Opponent	Site	TV	Result	Attendance	Source
September 16	1:30 p.m.	East Carolina*	Kenan Memorial Stadium; Chapel Hill, NC		W 14–10	51,150	
September 23	1:30 p.m.	No. 18 Maryland	Kenan Memorial Stadium; Chapel Hill, NC		L 20–21	48,000	
September 30	1:50 p.m.	at No. 9 Pittsburgh*	Pitt Stadium; Pittsburgh, PA	ABC	L 16–20	50,439	
October 7	1:30 p.m.	Miami (OH)*	Kenan Memorial Stadium; Chapel Hill, NC		L 3–7	48,000	
October 14	1:30 p.m.	at Wake Forest	Groves Stadium; Winston-Salem, NC (rivalry)		W 34–29	32,300	
October 21	1:30 p.m.	NC State	Kenan Memorial Stadium; Chapel Hill, NC (rivalry)		L 7–34	50,250	
October 28	1:30 p.m.	at South Carolina*	Williams–Brice Stadium; Columbia, SC (rivalry)		W 24–22	55,104	
November 4	1:30 p.m.	at Richmond*	City Stadium; Richmond, VA		L 18–27	15,000	
November 11	1:00 p.m.	at No. 15 Clemson	Memorial Stadium; Clemson, SC		L 9–13	53,495	
November 18	1:30 p.m.	Virginia	Kenan Memorial Stadium; Chapel Hill, NC (South's Oldest Rivalry)		W 38–20	44,000	
November 25	1:30 p.m.	Duke	Kenan Memorial Stadium; Chapel Hill, NC (Victory Bell)		W 16–15	45,000	
*Non-conference game; Rankings from AP Poll released prior to the game; All times are in Eastern time

== Roster ==
- RB Amos Lawrence, So.
