= 1978 The Citadel Bulldogs football team =

American college football season

1978 The Citadel Bulldogs football
- Conference: Southern Conference
- Record: 5–6 (2–3 SoCon)
- Head coach: Art Baker (1st season)
- Offensive coordinator: Ralph Friedgen (2nd season)
- Defensive coordinator: Frank Beamer (2nd season)
- Home stadium: Johnson Hagood Stadium

1978 Southern Conference football standings
| | Conf. | | | | | Overall |
| Team | W | | L | | T | W | | L | | T |
|---|---|---|---|---|---|---|---|---|---|---|
| Furman + | 4 | – | 1 | – | 0 | 8 | – | 3 | – | 0 |
| Chattanooga + | 4 | – | 1 | – | 0 | 7 | – | 3 | – | 1 |
| Appalachian State | 4 | – | 2 | – | 0 | 7 | – | 4 | – | 0 |
| Western Carolina | 4 | – | 2 | – | 0 | 6 | – | 5 | – | 0 |
| The Citadel | 2 | – | 3 | – | 0 | 5 | – | 6 | – | 0 |
| VMI | 1 | – | 4 | – | 0 | 3 | – | 8 | – | 0 |
| Marshall | 0 | – | 5 | – | 0 | 1 | – | 10 | – | 0 |
| Davidson | 0 | – | 0 | – | 0 | 5 | – | 5 | – | 0 |
| East Tennessee State | 0 | – | 0 | – | 0 | 4 | – | 7 | – | 0 |
+ – Conference co-champions; The conference was a hybrid of NCAA Division I-A and I-AA teams. Davidson was classified as I-AA. All the other teams were classified as I-A. Davidson and East Tennessee State were ineligible for the conference title. VMI's games against William & Mary and Richmond and Chattanooga's game against Richmond were designated as conference games and counted in the SoCon standings.

The 1978 The Citadel Bulldogs football team represented The Citadel, The Military College of South Carolina in the 1978 NCAA Division I-A football season. Art Baker served as head coach for the first season. The Bulldogs played as members of the Southern Conference and played home games at Johnson Hagood Stadium.

== Schedule ==
| Date | Opponent | Site | Result | Attendance | Source |
|---|---|---|---|---|---|
| September 9 | Presbyterian* | Johnson Hagood Stadium; Charleston, SC | W 28–17 | 17,840 | |
| September 16 | at Clemson* | Memorial Stadium; Clemson, SC | L 3–58 | 53,332–54,075 | |
| September 23 | VMI | Johnson Hagood Stadium; Charleston, SC (rivalry) | W 14–3 | 15,980 | |
| September 30 | at Georgia Tech* | Grant Field; Atlanta, GA | L 0–28 | 21,802 | |
| October 7 | Marshall | Johnson Hagood Stadium; Charleston, SC | W 41–0 | 14,100 | |
| October 14 | at Western Carolina | E. J. Whitmire Stadium; Cullowhee, NC | L 24–38 | | |
| October 21 | at Appalachian State | Conrad Stadium; Boone, NC | L 14–42 | 11,130 | |
| October 29 | Delaware* | Johnson Hagood Stadium; Charleston, SC | W 21–14 | 13,155 | |
| November 4 | at William & Mary* | Cary Field; Williamsburg, VA | L 8–12 | 8,800 | |
| November 11 | Wofford*^{†} | Johnson Hagood Stadium; Charleston, SC (rivalry) | W 35–17 | 16,800 | |
| November 18 | at Furman | Sirrine Stadium; Greenville, SC (rivalry) | L 13–17 | 13,312 | |
*Non-conference game; ^{†}Homecoming
