= Jackie Sherrill =

American football player and coach (born 1943)

Biographical details
- Born: November 28, 1943 (age 82); Duncan, Oklahoma, U.S.

Playing career
- 1962–1965: Alabama
- Positions: Fullback, linebacker

Coaching career (HC unless noted)
- 1966: Alabama (GA)
- 1967: Arkansas (GA)
- 1968–1969: Iowa State (DB)
- 1970–1972: Iowa State (AHC/DC)
- 1973–1975: Pittsburgh (AHC/DC)
- 1976: Washington State
- 1977–1981: Pittsburgh
- 1982–1988: Texas A&M
- 1991–2003: Mississippi State

Head coaching record
- Overall: 180–120–4
- Bowls: 8–6

Accomplishments and honors

Championships
- 3 SWC (1985–1987); 1 SEC Western Division (1998)

Awards
- Walter Camp Coach of the Year Award (1981); 3× SWC Coach of the Year (1985–1987)

Jackie Wayne Sherrill (born November 28, 1943) is an American former college football player and coach. He was the head football coach at Washington State University (1976), the University of Pittsburgh (1977–1981), Texas A&M University (1982–1988), and Mississippi State University (1991–2003), compiling a career head coaching record of 180–120–4. Sherrill is a studio analyst for Fox Sports Net's college football coverage.

== Playing career ==
Sherrill played football at the University of Alabama under Bear Bryant from 1962 to 1965, helping the Crimson Tide win two national championships.

== Coaching career ==
=== Washington State ===
Sherrill was the head coach at Washington State for one year, in 1976. During his one season, the Cougars had a win–loss record of 3-8.

=== Pittsburgh ===
Sherrill was the head coach at the University of Pittsburgh from 1977 to 1981. Before going to Washington State, Sherrill had served as an assistant at Pittsburgh under head coach Johnny Majors. When Majors left Pittsburgh to return to his alma mater at the University of Tennessee, Sherrill returned to become the head coach of the Panthers. He is credited with grooming quarterback Dan Marino, who went on to a prolific Hall of Fame career in the National Football League after being Sherrill's last quarterback at Pitt, from 1979 to 1982. Years later, Sherill would relate how Marino took it upon himself to choose the last play of the game that would win the 1982 Sugar Bowl for the Panthers. Pitt, down 17-20 and with 42 seconds to go in the last quarter, has the ball in the Georgia Bulldogs’ 33-yard line, with 4th down and 4 coming up. Pitt calls a time-out to discuss the next play and everyone thinks kick to tie the score. Marino, obviously not wanting to play for a tie, states "If there is any time at all on the clock, then there is enough time for us to win. We are here to win this damn game," in the sidelines' huddle, and asked by the coach to repeat what he said, again states, "We are here to win this damn game." He then throws a 33-yard pass to tight end John Brown for the game- and bowl-winning touchdown.

During his tenure, Sherrill's coaching staff included future NFL head coaches Jimmy Johnson and Dave Wannstedt. In Sherrill's five seasons at Pittsburgh, the Panthers won 50 games, lost nine, and had one tie.

When asked about retirement, Joe Paterno once said that he would not, because it would leave college football in the hands of "the Jackie Sherrills and the Barry Switzers". Paterno apologized to Switzer for the comment, but wrote in his book that he "didn't give a damn about what Sherrill felt." Paterno later said that the comment was made off-the-record and in jest during a party at Paterno's house, but it was printed anyway. Sherrill and Paterno later became friends – and Sherrill and his wife were guests of the Paternos in State College in 2004. Notably, Sherrill went 2–3 in five games leading Pitt against Penn State, including a 48–14 loss in 1981 that destroyed Pitt's chances at a second national championship in six years.

=== Texas A&M ===
On January 19, 1982, Sherrill was hired by Texas A&M as a replacement for Tom Wilson, signing a record six year contract for over $1.7 million. Sherrill was the head coach of the Texas A&M Aggies from 1982 to 1988. While head coach at A&M Sherrill started the tradition of the "12th Man Kickoff Team"; this tradition is still observed by A&M today, though in a significantly scaled back form, including a single walk-on rather than an entire kicking team unit. In his seven seasons as the coach of the Aggies, Texas A&M won 52 games, lost 28, and had one tie. Texas A&M won three consecutive Southwest Conference championships under Sherrill, in 1985, 1986 and 1987. As a result, the Aggies played in the Cotton Bowl Classic at the end of each season, defeating Auburn University 36–16 on January 1, 1986 and Notre Dame 35–10 on January 1, 1988, and losing to Ohio State University 28–12 on January 1, 1987. He is also one of the few coaches to leave Texas A&M with a winning record against the Longhorns, winning his last five against Texas after losing his first two. However, he only won three out of seven games versus Texas A&M's other conference rival, Arkansas, in that same time span. Prior to the 1988 game at Arkansas, Sherrill was quoted saying "Any team that wants to win the conference will have to beat us first". Arkansas head coach Ken Hatfield and his players took that quote to heart, and defeated the Aggies 25-20 to win the conference title, ending A&M's Southwest Conference championship streak at three.

In 1988, Sherrill's Aggies were put under probation by the NCAA for a period of two years. Violations included improper employment, extra benefits, unethical conduct and lack of institutional control. Sherrill was not personally found guilty of any infractions. However, in December 1988, Sherrill resigned.

=== Mississippi State ===
After two seasons away from the game (1989 and 1990), Sherrill was hired as head coach at Mississippi State University in 1991. He took over a program that hadn't had a winning season since 1986, winning only 14 games in that stretch. Mississippi State hadn't had a winning record in Southeastern Conference play since 1981. Sherrill began his Mississippi State career with an upset victory over the defending Southwest Conference champion Texas Longhorns.

In thirteen seasons in Starkville, Sherrill coached the Bulldogs to a record of 75–75–2. His 75 wins are the most in school history. He led the team to a share of the SEC West title in 1998. A 22-21 upset win over Arkansas garnered the Bulldogs an appearance in the SEC Championship Game, but they lost to eventual national champion Tennessee. They finished the season with a loss to the Texas Longhorns and Heisman trophy winner Ricky Williams in the Cotton Bowl Classic. A year later, he notched a 10–2 record, a final ranking of #12 in the AP Poll, and an appearance in the Peach Bowl. Sherrill's losses in 1999 were at Alabama and at Arkansas. That #12 ranking was the highest final ranking achieved by any NCAA Division I-A school in Mississippi in over 30 years. Sherrill, along with Bill Snyder of Kansas State, were among the first to use the JUCO systems of their respective states to help their programs progress.

Sherrill elevated the performance of the Mississippi State program despite playing in the same division as Alabama, Auburn, Ole Miss, Arkansas, and LSU from 1992 onward, with the SEC’s expansion to twelve teams. He finished with a winning record against arch-rival Ole Miss (7–6), and led the Bulldogs to six bowl games. Before his arrival they'd been to seven bowls in their history. However, just like his tenure at Texas A&M, Sherrill still had difficulty beating Arkansas, finishing with a 3-8-1 record against the Razorbacks, to include losing his last five games against them. Although he only won a total of eight games in his final three seasons, he is credited with resurrecting the Bulldog program.

Sherrill also achieved notoriety by having his team observe the castration of a bull as a motivational technique prior to a game versus Texas. Unranked Mississippi State subsequently beat the #13 ranked Longhorns.

Sherrill retired after the 2003 season, which was followed by the NCAA levying probation for four years on the program. The NCAA announced that its infractions committee found two former assistants and several boosters broke recruiting rules between 1998-2002. Among the violations, the committee found members of the Mississippi State football program improperly reimbursed prospective student-athletes for recruiting trips, giving recruits and their families money for hotel rooms and rental cars. An assistant coach arranged to pay for the summer school classes a recruit needed to become eligible and a booster allowed two recruits to stay in a hotel in Starkville for free. It was the second time in recent years the Mississippi State football program has been sanctioned by the NCAA. Mississippi State was considered a repeat offender because the school also lost 13 scholarships after an investigation in 1996. As a result of the NCAA investigation, Mississippi State's football program was placed on probation by the NCAA for four years. Penalties included being stripped of eight scholarships over the next two seasons, being banned from postseason play, and being limited to 45 expense-paid recruiting visits in each of the 2004–05 and 2005-06 academic years. Despite the sanctions imposed on the Mississippi State football team, allegations of unethical conduct against former coach Jackie Sherrill were dismissed.

On December 2, 2004, Sherrill filed a lawsuit against the NCAA, Rich Johanningmeier (principal NCAA investigator in the MSU probation), and Julie Gibert (an Ole Miss booster), alleging 18 counts of wrongdoing. Among the allegations include charges that the NCAA defamed him and conspired to drive him out of coaching, that Johanningmeier was unethically influenced by Gibert in his investigation of MSU, and that they conspired to fabricate NCAA charges against him. Johanningmeier has stated that he stands by the recordings and transcripts in the case. Nearly 15 years later, Sherrill and the NCAA settled their lawsuit on July 17, 2019.

== Head coaching record ==
Year	Team	Overall	Conference	Standing	Bowl/playoffs	Coaches^{#}	AP^{°}
Washington State Cougars (Pacific-8 Conference) (1976)
1976	Washington State	3–8	2–5				
Washington State:		3–8	2–5				
Pittsburgh Panthers (NCAA Division I / I-A independent) (1977–1981)
1977	Pittsburgh	9–2–1			W Gator	7	8
1978	Pittsburgh	8–4			L Tangerine		
1979	Pittsburgh	11–1			W Fiesta	6	7
1980	Pittsburgh	11–1			W Gator	2	2
1981	Pittsburgh	11–1			W Sugar	2	4
Pittsburgh:		50–9–1					
Texas A&M Aggies (Southwest Conference) (1982–1988)
1982	Texas A&M	5–6	3–5	T–6th			
1983	Texas A&M	5–5–1	4–3–1	T–3rd			
1984	Texas A&M	6–5	3–5	7th			
1985	Texas A&M	10–2	7–1	1st	W Cotton	6	6
1986	Texas A&M	9–3	7–1	1st	L Cotton	12	13
1987	Texas A&M	10–2	6–1	1st	W Cotton	9	10
1988	Texas A&M	7–5	6–1	2nd			
Texas A&M:		52–28–1	36–17–1				
Mississippi State Bulldogs (Southeastern Conference) (1991–2003)
1991	Mississippi State	7–5	4–3	T–4th	L Liberty		
1992	Mississippi State	7–5	4–4	3rd (Western)	L Peach		23
1993	Mississippi State	4–5–2	3–4–1	4th (Western)			
1994	Mississippi State	8–4	5–3	2nd (Western)	L Peach	25	24
1995	Mississippi State	3–8	1–7	4th (Western)			
1996	Mississippi State	5–6	3–5	4th (Western)			
1997	Mississippi State	7–4	4–4	T–3rd (Western)			
1998	Mississippi State	8–5	6–2	T-1st (Western)	L Cotton		
1999	Mississippi State	10–2	6–2	2nd (Western)	W Peach	12	13
2000	Mississippi State	8–4	4–4	T–3rd (Western)	W Independence	22	24
2001	Mississippi State	3–8	2–6	6th (Western)			
2002	Mississippi State	3–9	0–8	6th (Western)			
2003	Mississippi State	2–10	1–7	6th (Western)			
Mississippi State:		75–75–2	43–59–1				
Total:		180–120–4					
National championship Conference title Conference division title or championship game berth
^{#}Rankings from final Coaches Poll.; ^{°}Rankings from final AP Poll.
