= 1978 VMI Keydets football team =

American college football season

1978 VMI Keydets football
- Conference: Southern Conference
- Record: 3–8 (1–4 SoCon)
- Head coach: Bob Thalman (8th season)
- Home stadium: Alumni Memorial Field

1978 Southern Conference football standings
	Conf.					Overall
Team	W		L		T	W		L		T
Furman +	4	–	1	–	0	8	–	3	–	0
Chattanooga +	4	–	1	–	0	7	–	3	–	1
Appalachian State	4	–	2	–	0	7	–	4	–	0
Western Carolina	4	–	2	–	0	6	–	5	–	0
The Citadel	2	–	3	–	0	5	–	6	–	0
VMI	1	–	4	–	0	3	–	8	–	0
Marshall	0	–	5	–	0	1	–	10	–	0
Davidson	0	–	0	–	0	5	–	5	–	0
East Tennessee State	0	–	0	–	0	4	–	7	–	0
+ – Conference co-champions; The conference was a hybrid of NCAA Division I-A and I-AA teams. Davidson was classified as I-AA. All the other teams were classified as I-A. Davidson and East Tennessee State were ineligible for the conference title. VMI's games against William & Mary and Richmond and Chattanooga's game against Richmond were designated as conference games and counted in the SoCon standings.

The 1978 VMI Keydets football team was an American football team that represented the Virginia Military Institute (VMI) as a member of the Southern Conference (SoCon) during the 1978 NCAA Division I-A football season. In their eighth year under head coach Bob Thalman, the Keydets compiled an overall record of 3–8 with a mark of 1–4 in conference play, placing sixth in the SoCon.

== Schedule ==
Date	Opponent	Site	Result	Attendance	Source
September 9	at William & Mary (Note: VMI's games against William & Mary and Richmond were designated as conference games and counted in the SoCon standings.)	Cary Field; Williamsburg, VA (rivalry)	L 3–10	14,100	
September 16	Bucknell*	Alumni Memorial Field; Lexington, VA	W 25–14		
September 23	at The Citadel	Johnson Hagood Stadium; Charleston, SC (rivalry)	L 3–14	15,980	
September 30	at Virginia*	Scott Stadium; Charlottesville, VA	W 17–9	21,150	
October 7	East Carolina*	Alumni Memorial Field; Lexington, VA	L 6–19	6,900	
October 14	at Richmond	City Stadium; Richmond, VA (Tobacco Bowl, rivalry)	W 23–6	20,000	
October 21	Lehigh*	Alumni Memorial Field; Lexington, VA	L 10–14	8,400	
October 28	Western Carolina	Alumni Memorial Field; Lexington, VA	L 12–41		
November 4	at No. 13 Georgia*	Sanford Stadium; Athens, GA	L 3–41	50,200	
November 11	Appalachian State	Alumni Memorial Field; Lexington, VA	L 10–31	4,600	
November 18	at Virginia Tech*	Lane Stadium; Blacksburg, VA (rivalry)	L 2–28	20,000	
*Non-conference game; Rankings from AP Poll released prior to the game
