= 1999 Peach Bowl =

American college football game

1999 Chick-fil-A Peach Bowl
- 32nd Peach Bowl
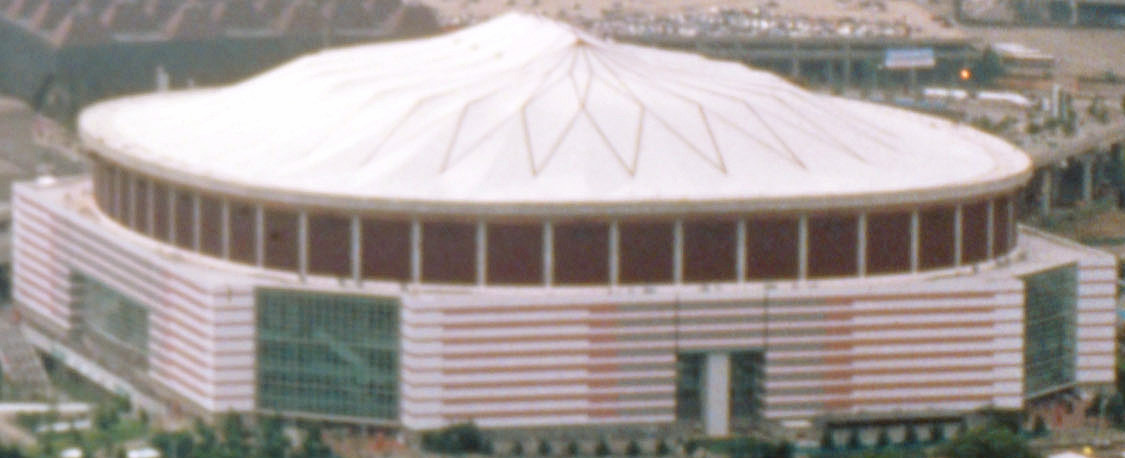
- The Georgia Dome in Atlanta, Georgia, hosted the Peach Bowl.
Clemson Tigers	Mississippi State Bulldogs
(6–5)	(9–2)
ACC	SEC
7	17
Head coach: Tommy Bowden	Head coach: Jackie Sherrill
	AP / Coaches / BCS; 15 / 16 / 16
	1	2	3	4	Total
Clemson	0	0	0	7	7
Mississippi State	0	0	3	14	17
- Date: December 30, 1999
- Season: 1999
- Stadium: Georgia Dome
- Location: Atlanta, Georgia
- Referee: Richard Honig (Big Ten)

United States TV coverage
- Network: ESPN
- Announcers: Dave Barnett, Bill Curry, and Dave Ryan

The 1999 Peach Bowl featured the Clemson Tigers and Mississippi State Bulldogs.

After a scoreless first half, Mississippi State scored first on a 39-yard Scott Westerfield field goal, taking a 3–0 lead. In the fourth quarter, Wayne Madkin scored on a 2-yard touchdown run increasing the lead to 10–0. Clemson's Brandon Streeter responded with a 1-yard scoring run making it 10–7. Madkin's 15 yard touchdown pass to Dontae Walker gave MSU the 17–7 win.

With the win, the Bulldogs won their first bowl game since 1981.
