= 1978 Wake Forest Demon Deacons football team =

American college football season

1978 Wake Forest Demon Deacons football
- Conference: Atlantic Coast Conference
- Record: 1–10 (1–5 ACC)
- Head coach: John Mackovic (1st season)
- Captain: Game captains
- Home stadium: Groves Stadium

1978 Atlantic Coast Conference football standings
	Conf.					Overall
Team	W		L		T	W		L		T
No. 6 Clemson $	6	–	0	–	0	11	–	1	–	0
No. 20 Maryland	5	–	1	–	0	9	–	3	–	0
No. 18 NC State	4	–	2	–	0	9	–	3	–	0
North Carolina	3	–	3	–	0	5	–	6	–	0
Duke	2	–	4	–	0	4	–	7	–	0
Wake Forest	1	–	5	–	0	1	–	10	–	0
Virginia	0	–	6	–	0	2	–	9	–	0
$ – Conference champion; Rankings from AP Poll

The 1978 Wake Forest Demon Deacons football team was an American football team that represented Wake Forest University during the 1978 NCAA Division I-A football season. In their first season under head coach John Mackovic, the Demon Deacons compiled a 1–10 record and finished in sixth place in the Atlantic Coast Conference.

== Schedule ==
Date	Opponent	Site	Result	Attendance	Source
September 9	Virginia	Groves Stadium; Winston-Salem, NC	W 14–0	21,500	
September 16	Virginia Tech*	Groves Stadium; Winston-Salem, NC	L 6–28	22,750	
September 23	at No. 10 LSU*	Tiger Stadium; Baton Rouge, LA	L 11–13	77,197	
September 30	NC State	Groves Stadium; Winston-Salem, NC (rivalry)	L 10–34	29,700	
October 7	at Purdue*	Ross–Ade Stadium; West Lafayette, IN	L 7–14	54,362	
October 14	North Carolina	Groves Stadium; Winston-Salem, NC (rivalry)	L 29–34	32,300	
October 21	at No. 6 Maryland	Byrd Stadium; College Park, MD	L 0–39	43,119	
October 28	at Auburn*	Jordan–Hare Stadium; Auburn, AL	L 7–21	52,210	
November 4	No. 16 Clemson	Groves Stadium; Winston-Salem, NC	L 6–51	30,400	
November 11	at Duke	Wallace Wade Stadium; Durham, NC (rivalry)	L 0–3	19,825	
November 18	at South Carolina*	Williams–Brice Stadium; Columbia, SC	L 14–37	42,762	
*Non-conference game; Rankings from AP Poll released prior to the game

== Team leaders ==
Category	Team Leader	Att/Cth	Yds
Passing	David Webber	101/182	1,070
Rushing	James McDougald	146	629
Receiving	Mike Mullen	22	307
