= 1978 Tangerine Bowl =

American college football game

Pittsburgh Panthers	NC State Wolfpack
(8–3)	(8–3)
Independent	ACC
17	30
Head coach: Jackie Sherrill	Head coach: Bo Rein
AP / Coaches; 16 / 13
	1	2	3	4	Total
Pittsburgh	0	0	3	14	17
NC State	7	10	3	10	30
- Date: December 23, 1978
- Season: 1978
- Stadium: Orlando Stadium
- Location: Orlando, Florida
- MVP: Ted Brown, NC State (overall); Nathan Ritter, NC State (offensive); John Stanton, NC State (defensive)
- Favorite: Pitt by 6
- Attendance: 31,356

The 1978 Tangerine Bowl was an American college football bowl game that was played on December 23, 1978 at Orlando Stadium in Orlando, Florida. The game matched the Pittsburgh Panthers against the NC State Wolfpack. It was the final contest of the 1978 NCAA Division I-A football season for both teams. The game ended in a 30–17 victory for the Wolfpack.

== Teams ==
The game matched the Pittsburgh Panthers against the NC State Wolfpack of the Atlantic Coast Conference. The Panthers had no affiliation to a conference, and the Wolfpack had a conference record of 4–2. The game was the first bowl game featuring the Panthers and the Wolfpack, and was their third overall meeting. Pittsburgh led the series 2–0 heading into the game, and the teams' previous meeting was in 1953, when the Panthers defeated the Wolfpack 40–6.

== Game summary ==
=== Statistics ===
Statistics	PITT	NCSU
Plays–yards	82–378	69–310
Rushes–yards	34–110	60–207
Passing yards	268	103
Passing: Comp–Att–Int	32–48–4	6–9–0

=== Scoring summary ===
Scoring summary

Quarter	Time	Drive			Team	Scoring information	Score	
Quarter	Time	Plays	Yards	TOP	Team	Scoring information	PITT	NCSU
1	4:44				NCSU	Ted Brown 1-yard touchdown run, Nathan Ritter kick good	0	7
2	11:54	4	0		NCSU	51-yard field goal by Nathan Ritter	0	10
2	8:35	3			NCSU	Buster Ray 55-yard touchdown reception from John Isley, Nathan Ritter kick good	0	17
3	10:47				PITT	37-yard field goal by Mark Schubert	3	17
3	7:17				NCSU	29-yard field goal by Nathan Ritter	3	20
4	14:13		68		NCSU	23-yard field goal by Nathan Ritter	3	23
4	7:55		71		PITT	Freddy Jacobs 1-yard touchdown run, Mark Schubert kick good	10	23
4					NCSU	Interception returned 66 yards for touchdown by Mike Nall, Nathan Ritter kick good	10	30
4	1:35				PITT	Russell Carter 1-yard touchdown run, Mark Schubert kick good	17	30
"TOP" = time of possession. For other American football terms, see Glossary of American football.							17	30
