= 1978 NC State Wolfpack football team =

American college football season

1978 NC State Wolfpack football

Tangerine Bowl, W 30–17 vs. Pittsburgh
- Conference: Atlantic Coast Conference

Ranking
- Coaches: No. 19
- AP: No. 18
- Record: 9–3 (4–2 ACC)
- Head coach: Bo Rein (3rd season)
- Home stadium: Carter Stadium

1978 Atlantic Coast Conference football standings
	Conf.					Overall
Team	W		L		T	W		L		T
No. 6 Clemson $	6	–	0	–	0	11	–	1	–	0
No. 20 Maryland	5	–	1	–	0	9	–	3	–	0
No. 18 NC State	4	–	2	–	0	9	–	3	–	0
North Carolina	3	–	3	–	0	5	–	6	–	0
Duke	2	–	4	–	0	4	–	7	–	0
Wake Forest	1	–	5	–	0	1	–	10	–	0
Virginia	0	–	6	–	0	2	–	9	–	0
$ – Conference champion; Rankings from AP Poll

The 1978 NC State Wolfpack football team represented North Carolina State University during the 1978 NCAA Division I-A football season. The team's head coach was Bo Rein. NC State has been a member of the Atlantic Coast Conference (ACC) since the league's inception in 1953. The Wolfpack played its home games in 1978 at Carter Stadium (now Carter–Finley Stadium) in Raleigh, North Carolina, which has been NC State football's home stadium since 1966.

== Schedule ==
Date	Opponent	Rank	Site	TV	Result	Attendance	Source
September 9	East Carolina*		Carter Stadium; Raleigh, NC (rivalry)		W 29–13	50,800	
September 16	Syracuse*		Carter Stadium; Raleigh, NC		W 27–19	37,800	
September 23	West Virginia*		Carter Stadium; Raleigh, NC		W 29–15	42,200	
September 30	at Wake Forest		Groves Stadium; Winston-Salem, NC (rivalry)		W 34–10	29,700	
October 7	at No. 12 Maryland	No. 20	Byrd Stadium; College Park, MD		L 7–31	45,319	
October 21	at North Carolina		Kenan Memorial Stadium; Chapel Hill, NC (rivalry)		W 34–7	50,250	
October 28	No. 20 Clemson		Carter Stadium; Raleigh, NC (rivalry)		L 10–33	45,000	
November 4	South Carolina*		Carter Stadium; Raleigh, NC		W 22–13	34,400	
November 11	at No. 2 Penn State*		Beaver Stadium; University Park, PA		L 10–19	77,043	
November 18	Duke		Carter Stadium; Raleigh, NC (rivalry)		W 24–10	43,300	
November 25	at Virginia		Scott Stadium; Charlottesville, VA		W 24–21	14,227	
December 23	vs. No. 16 Pittsburgh*		Orlando Stadium; Orlando, FL (Tangerine Bowl)	Mizlou	W 30–17	31,356	
*Non-conference game; Rankings from AP Poll released prior to the game

== Roster ==
1978 NC State Wolfpack football team roster
Players
Coaches
Offense

Pos.	#	Name	Class
RB	23	Ted Brown	Sr
TE	80	Lin Dawson	Fr
OT	76	Chris Dieterich	Jr
C	51	Jim Ritcher	Jr

Defense

Pos.	#	Name	Class
LB	54	Bill Cowher	Sr
DT	91	Bubba Green	So
DT	95	Brian O'Doherty	Jr

Special teams

Pos.	#	Name	Class

Head coach

- Bo Rein

Coordinators/assistant coaches

Legend

- (C) Team captain
- (S) Suspended
- (I) Ineligible
- Injured
- Redshirt
