= 1999 Mississippi State Bulldogs football team =

American college football season

1999 Mississippi State Bulldogs football

Peach Bowl champion

Peach Bowl, W 17–7 vs. Clemson
- Conference: Southeastern Conference
- Western Division

Ranking
- Coaches: No. 12
- AP: No. 13
- Record: 10–2 (6–2 SEC)
- Head coach: Jackie Sherrill (9th season)
- Offensive coordinator: Sparky Woods (1st season)
- Offensive scheme: Multiple I formation
- Defensive coordinator: Joe Lee Dunn (4th season)
- Base defense: 3–3 stack
- Home stadium: Scott Field

1999 Southeastern Conference football standings
	Conf.			Overall
Team	W		L	W		L
Eastern Division
No. 12 Florida x	7	–	1	9	–	4
No. 9 Tennessee	6	–	2	9	–	3
No. 16 Georgia	5	–	3	8	–	4
Kentucky	4	–	4	6	–	6
Vanderbilt	2	–	6	5	–	6
South Carolina	0	–	8	0	–	11
Western Division
No. 8 Alabama x$	7	–	1	10	–	3
No. 13 Mississippi State	6	–	2	10	–	2
No. 22 Ole Miss	4	–	4	8	–	4
No. 17 Arkansas	4	–	4	8	–	4
Auburn	2	–	6	5	–	6
LSU	1	–	7	3	–	8
Championship: Alabama 34, Florida 7
$ – BCS representative as conference champion; x – Division champion/co-champions; Rankings from AP Poll

The 1999 Mississippi State Bulldogs football team represented Mississippi State University as a member of the Western Division of the Southern Conference (SEC) during the 1999 NCAA Division I-A football season. Led by ninth-year head coach Jackie Sherrill, the Bulldogs compiled an overall record of 10–2 with a mark of 6–2 in conference play, placing second in the SEC's Western Division. Mississippi State was invited to the Peach Bowl, where Bulldogs defeated Clemson. The team played home games at Scott Field in Starkville, Mississippi.

== Schedule ==
Date	Time	Opponent	Rank	Site	TV	Result	Attendance	Source
September 4	6:00 pm	Middle Tennessee*		Scott Field; Starkville, MS		W 40–7	35,230	
September 11	7:30 pm	Memphis*		Scott Field; Starkville, MS	FSN	W 13–10	32,010	
September 18	2:30 pm	Oklahoma State*		Scott Field; Starkville, MS	JPS	W 29–11	38,193	
September 25	6:00 pm	South Carolina	No. 23	Scott Field; Starkville, MS		W 17–0	37,693	
October 2	1:00 pm	at Vanderbilt	No. 16	Vanderbilt Stadium; Nashville, TN		W 42–14	37,120	
October 9	11:30 am	at Auburn	No. 14	Jordan-Hare Stadium; Auburn, AL	JPS	W 18–16	80,394	
October 23	5:00 pm	LSU^{†}	No. 12	Scott Field; Starkville, MS (rivalry)	ESPN2	W 17–16	41,274	
November 4	7:00 pm	Kentucky	No. 8	Scott Field; Starkville, MS	ESPN	W 23–22	39,149	
November 13	2:30 pm	at No. 11 Alabama	No. 8	Bryant–Denny Stadium; Tuscaloosa, AL (rivalry)	CBS	L 7–19	83,818	
November 20	8:00 pm	at No. 22 Arkansas	No. 12	War Memorial Stadium; Little Rock, AR	ESPN2	L 9–14	55,491	
November 25	7:00 pm	No. 23 Ole Miss	No. 18	Scott Field; Starkville, MS (Egg Bowl)	ESPN	W 23–20	41,200	
December 30	6:30 pm	vs. Clemson*	No. 15	Georgia Dome; Atlanta, GA (Peach Bowl)	ESPN	W 17–7	73,315	
*Non-conference game; ^{†}Homecoming; Rankings from AP Poll released prior to the game; All times are in Central time

== Rankings ==
Ranking movements Legend: ██ Increase in ranking ██ Decrease in ranking — = Not ranked RV = Received votes т = Tied with team above or below
	Week																
Poll	Pre	1	2	3	4	5	6	7	8	9	10	11	12	13	14	15	Final
AP	RV	RV	RV	RV	23	16	14	12	12	8T	8	8	12	18	16	15	13
Coaches Poll	RV	RV*	RV	RV	23	16	13	12	11	8	8	7	15	19	18	16	12
BCS	Not released									11	12	10	15	—	—	—	Not released
