= 1978 Pittsburgh Panthers football team =

American college football season

1978 Pittsburgh Panthers football

Tangerine Bowl, L 17–30 vs. NC State
- Conference: Independent
- Record: 8–4
- Head coach: Jackie Sherrill (2nd season)
- Offensive coordinator: Don Boyce (1st season)
- Offensive scheme: Split backs
- Defensive coordinator: Jimmy Johnson (2nd season)
- Base defense: 5–2
- Home stadium: Pitt Stadium

1978 NCAA Division I-A independents football records
	Conf.					Overall
Team	W		L		T	W		L		T
No. 4 Penn State		–		–		11	–	1	–	0
North Texas State		–		–		9	–	2	–	0
East Carolina		–		–		9	–	3	–	0
Navy		–		–		9	–	3	–	0
No. 7 Notre Dame		–		–		9	–	3	–	0
Rutgers		–		–		9	–	3	–	0
Florida State		–		–		8	–	3	–	0
Tennessee State		–		–		8	–	3	–	0
Temple		–		–		7	–	3	–	1
Pittsburgh		–		–		8	–	4	–	0
Holy Cross		–		–		7	–	4	–	0
Louisville		–		–		7	–	4	–	0
UNLV		–		–		7	–	4	–	0
Southern Miss		–		–		7	–	4	–	0
Northeast Louisiana		–		–		6	–	4	–	1
Georgia Tech		–		–		7	–	5	–	0
Hawaii		–		–		6	–	5	–	0
Miami (FL)		–		–		6	–	5	–	0
South Carolina		–		–		5	–	5	–	1
William & Mary		–		–		5	–	5	–	1
Cincinnati		–		–		5	–	6	–	0
Villanova		–		–		5	–	6	–	0
Army		–		–		4	–	6	–	1
Memphis State		–		–		4	–	7	–	0
Tulane		–		–		4	–	7	–	0
Virginia Tech		–		–		4	–	7	–	0
Air Force		–		–		3	–	8	–	0
Colgate		–		–		3	–	8	–	0
Richmond		–		–		3	–	8	–	0
Syracuse		–		–		3	–	8	–	0
Illinois State		–		–		2	–	9	–	0
West Virginia		–		–		2	–	9	–	0
Boston College		–		–		0	–	11	–	0
Rankings from AP Poll

The 1978 Pittsburgh Panthers football team represented the University of Pittsburgh as an independent during the 1978 NCAA Division I-A football season. The Panthers competed in the 1978 Tangerine Bowl.

Coach Jackie Sherrill stated in the pre-season that he expected to have "another outstanding football team".

== Schedule ==
Date	Time	Opponent	Rank	Site	TV	Result	Attendance	Source
September 16	8:30 p.m.	at Tulane	No. 14	Louisiana Superdome; New Orleans, LA		W 24–6	32,658	
September 23	1:30 p.m.	Temple	No. 11	Pitt Stadium; Pittsburgh, PA		W 20–12	43,445	
September 30	1:30 p.m.	North Carolina	No. 9	Pitt Stadium; Pittsburgh, PA	ABC	W 20–16	50,439	
October 7	1:30 p.m.	at Boston College	No. 9	Alumni Stadium; Chestnut Hill, MA		W 32–15	21,673	
October 14	12:30 p.m.	at Notre Dame	No. 9	Notre Dame Stadium; Notre Dame, IN (rivalry)	ABC	L 17–26	59,075	
October 21	1:30 p.m.	Florida State^{†}	No. 15	Pitt Stadium; Pittsburgh, PA		W 7–3	55,104	
October 28	2:00 p.m.	at No. 18 Navy	No. 15	Navy–Marine Corps Memorial Stadium; Annapolis, MD		L 11–21	32,909	
November 4	1:00 p.m.	at Syracuse	No. 19	Archbold Stadium; Syracuse, NY (rivalry)		W 18–17	26,037	
November 11	1:30 p.m.	West Virginia	No. 20	Pitt Stadium; Pittsburgh, PA (Backyard Brawl)		W 52–7	53,074	
November 18	1:30 p.m.	Army	No. 18	Pitt Stadium; Pittsburgh, PA		W 35–17	45,297	
November 24	1:30 p.m.	at No. 1 Penn State	No. 15	Beaver Stadium; University Park, PA (rivalry)	ABC	L 10–17	77,465	
December 23	8:00 p.m.	vs. NC State	No. 16	Orlando Stadium; Orlando, FL (Tangerine Bowl)	Mizlou	L 17–30	31,356	
^{†}Homecoming; Rankings from AP Poll released prior to the game; All times are in Eastern time

== Coaching staff ==
1978 Pittsburgh Panthers football staff
Coaching staff: Jackie Sherrill – Head coach; Jimmy Johnson – Assistant head coach/defensive coordinator; Don Boyce – Offensive coordinator/offensive line; Foge Fazio – Linebackers; Larry Holton – Defensive backs; Pat Jones – Defensive Front; Joe Moore – Offensive backs; Joe Pendry – Quarterbacks; Dave Wannstedt – Receivers	Support staff: Alex Kramer – Executive Assistant; Bob Matey – Scouting coordinator; Kevin Dickey – Graduate assistant; Gary Davis – Graduate assistant; Tony Wise – Graduate assistant	Strength and conditioning staff: Bob Matey – Weight Program

== Team players drafted into the NFL ==
Player	Position	Round	Pick	NFL club
Gordon Jones	Wide receiver	2	34	Tampa Bay Buccaneers
Walt Brown	Center	5	131	Detroit Lions
Jeff Delaney	Defensive back	7	190	Los Angeles Rams
Al Chesley	Linebacker	11	296	Philadelphia Eagles
David Logan	Nose Tackle	12	307	Tampa Bay Buccaneers
