= 1978 Maryland Terrapins football team =

American college football season

1978 Maryland Terrapins football

Sun Bowl, L 0–42 vs. Texas
- Conference: Atlantic Coast Conference

Ranking
- AP: No. 20
- Record: 9–3 (5–1 ACC)
- Head coach: Jerry Claiborne (7th season)
- Home stadium: Byrd Stadium

1978 Atlantic Coast Conference football standings
	Conf.					Overall
Team	W		L		T	W		L		T
No. 6 Clemson $	6	–	0	–	0	11	–	1	–	0
No. 20 Maryland	5	–	1	–	0	9	–	3	–	0
No. 18 NC State	4	–	2	–	0	9	–	3	–	0
North Carolina	3	–	3	–	0	5	–	6	–	0
Duke	2	–	4	–	0	4	–	7	–	0
Wake Forest	1	–	5	–	0	1	–	10	–	0
Virginia	0	–	6	–	0	2	–	9	–	0
$ – Conference champion; Rankings from AP Poll

The 1978 Maryland Terrapins football team represented the University of Maryland in the 1978 NCAA Division I-A football season. In their seventh season under head coach Jerry Claiborne, the Terrapins compiled a 9–3 record (5–1 in conference), finished in second place in the Atlantic Coast Conference, and outscored their opponents 261 to 167. The team ended its season with a 42–0 loss to Texas in the 1978 Sun Bowl. The team's statistical leaders included Tim O'Hare with 1,388 passing yards, Steve Atkins with 1,261 rushing yards, and Dean Richards with 575 receiving yards. TE

== Schedule ==
Date	Opponent	Rank	Site	TV	Result	Attendance	Source
September 9	Tulane*		Byrd Stadium; College Park, MD		W 31–7	31,458	
September 16	at Louisville*	No. 20	Fairgrounds Stadium; Louisville, KY		W 24–17	36,142	
September 23	at North Carolina	No. 18	Kenan Memorial Stadium; Chapel Hill, NC		W 21–20	48,000	
September 30	Kentucky*	No. 15	Byrd Stadium; College Park, MD		W 20–3	42,873	
October 7	No. 20 NC State	No. 12	Byrd Stadium; College Park, MD		W 31–7	45,319	
October 14	at Syracuse*	No. 10	Archbold Stadium; Syracuse, NY		W 24–9	15,079	
October 21	Wake Forest	No. 6	Byrd Stadium; College Park, MD		W 39–0	43,119	
October 28	at Duke	No. 5	Wallace Wade Stadium; Durham, NC		W 27–0	23,600	
November 4	at No. 2 Penn State*	No. 5	Beaver Stadium; University Park, PA (rivalry)	ABC	L 3–27	78,019	
November 11	at Virginia	No. 13	Scott Stadium; Charlottesville, VA (rivalry)		W 17–7	19,874	
November 18	No. 12 Clemson	No. 11	Byrd Stadium; College Park, MD		L 24–28	51,376	
December 23	vs. No. 14 Texas*	No. 13	Sun Bowl; El Paso, TX (Sun Bowl)	CBS	L 0–42	33,122	
*Non-conference game; Rankings from AP Poll released prior to the game
