= 1978 Duke Blue Devils football team =

American college football season

1978 Duke Blue Devils football
- Conference: Atlantic Coast Conference
- Record: 4–7 (2–4 ACC)
- Head coach: Mike McGee (8th season)
- Offensive coordinator: Dick Kemp (1st season)
- Defensive coordinator: John Gutekunst (3rd season)
- MVP: Carl McGee
- Captains: Dan Brooks; Mike Dunn; Carl McGee
- Home stadium: Wallace Wade Stadium

1978 Atlantic Coast Conference football standings
	Conf.					Overall
Team	W		L		T	W		L		T
No. 6 Clemson $	6	–	0	–	0	11	–	1	–	0
No. 20 Maryland	5	–	1	–	0	9	–	3	–	0
No. 18 NC State	4	–	2	–	0	9	–	3	–	0
North Carolina	3	–	3	–	0	5	–	6	–	0
Duke	2	–	4	–	0	4	–	7	–	0
Wake Forest	1	–	5	–	0	1	–	10	–	0
Virginia	0	–	6	–	0	2	–	9	–	0
$ – Conference champion; Rankings from AP Poll

The 1978 Duke Blue Devils football team was an American football team that represented Duke University as a member of the Atlantic Coast Conference (ACC) during the 1978 NCAA Division I-A football season. In their eighth year under head coach Mike McGee, the Blue Devils compiled an overall record of 4–7, with a conference record of 2–4, and finished fifth in the ACC.

== Schedule ==
Date	Opponent	Site	Result	Attendance	Source
September 9	Georgia Tech*	Wallace Wade Stadium; Durham, NC	W 28–10	27,865	
September 23	South Carolina*	Wallace Wade Stadium; Durham, NC	W 16–12	33,895	
September 30	at No. 4 Michigan*	Michigan Stadium; Ann Arbor, MI	L 0–52	104,832	
October 7	Virginia	Wallace Wade Stadium; Durham, NC	W 20–13	20,375	
October 14	at Navy*	Navy–Marine Corps Memorial Stadium; Annapolis, MD	L 8–31	21,431	
October 21	at Clemson	Memorial Stadium; Clemson, SC	L 8–28	51,109	
October 28	No. 5 Maryland^{†}	Wallace Wade Stadium; Durham, NC	L 0–27	23,600	
November 4	at Tennessee*	Neyland Stadium; Knoxville, TN	L 0–34	83,098	
November 11	Wake Forest	Wallace Wade Stadium; Durham, NC (rivalry)	W 3–0	19,825	
November 18	at NC State	Carter Stadium; Raleigh, NC (rivalry)	L 10–24	43,300	
November 25	at North Carolina	Kenan Stadium; Chapel Hill, NC (Victory Bell)	L 15–16	45,000	
*Non-conference game; ^{†}Homecoming; Rankings from AP Poll released prior to the game

== Roster ==
1978 Duke Blue Devils football team roster
Players
Coaches
Offense

Pos.	#	Name	Class
WR	10	Jeff Comer	Sr
QB	8	Mike Dunn	Sr
FB	48	Ned Gonet	Jr
OT	73	Scott Hamilton	Jr
C	59	Kevin Kelly	Jr
WR	84	Derrick Lewis	Jr
OT	60	Tom Luongo	Sr
TE	87	Joel Patten	Jr
G	66	Jay Pelosky	So
RB	47	Greg Rhett	Jr
G	69	Bob Riordan	Jr
TE	82	Glen Small	Sr
OT	79	Ken Staudinger	Sr

Defense

Pos.	#	Name	Class
DB	42	Dan Brooks	Sr
DT	94	Tim Cadigan	Jr
DT	99	Grant Cunningham	Jr
DE	80	Greg Dallas	Jr
DT	50	Eric Drescher	Jr
LB	17	Gary Garstkiewicz	So
LB	31	Bill King	Sr
DE	44	Derrick Mashore	Sr
LB	58	Carl McGee	Sr
DB	14	Rick Sommers	Sr

Special teams

Pos.	#	Name	Class

Head coach

- Mike McGee

Coordinators/assistant coaches

- John Gutekunst
  (Defensive coordinator & defensive backs coach)

Legend

- (C) Team captain
- (S) Suspended
- (I) Ineligible
- Injured
- Redshirt
