= Bo Rein =

American football player and coach, baseball player (1945–1980)

- Rein, c. 1979

Biographical details
- Born: July 20, 1945; Niles, Ohio, U.S.
- Died: January 10, 1980 (aged 34); Atlantic Ocean

Playing career

Football
- 1964–1966: Ohio State

Baseball
- 1965–1967: Ohio State
- Positions: Halfback (football); Shortstop, left field (baseball)

Coaching career (HC unless noted)

Football
- 1969–1970: William & Mary (assistant)
- 1971: Purdue (assistant)
- 1972–1974: NC State (assistant)
- 1975: Arkansas (OC)
- 1976–1979: NC State
- 1980: LSU (Note: Rein was hired in November 1979 and died in January 1980, before the start of LSU's season.)

Baseball
- 1971: William & Mary

Head coaching record
- Overall: 27–18–1 (football); 14–13 (baseball)
- Bowls: 2–0

Accomplishments and honors

Championships
- Football; 1 ACC (1979)

Awards
- Second-team All-Big Ten (1966)

Robert Edward Rein (July 20, 1945 – January 10, 1980) was an American football and baseball player and football coach. He was a two-sport athlete at Ohio State University and served as the head football coach at North Carolina State University from 1976 to 1979, compiling a record of 27–18–1. Following the 1979 season, Rein had assumed the role as head coach at Louisiana State University, but was killed in an aircraft accident in January 1980 before he ever coached a game for the Tigers. Rein is the namesake of football player awards at Ohio State and NC State.

== Early life ==
Rein was born and raised in Niles, Ohio, where he is still remembered as a legendary high school athlete for the Red Dragons of Niles McKinley High School. Rein played at Niles during their heyday, when the Red Dragons under coach Tony Mason were one of the top big school powerhouses in high school football in Ohio.

== Baseball career ==
Rein played baseball at Ohio State University from 1965 through 1967, helping the Buckeyes win the 1966 College World Series, the school's only NCAA baseball title. Rein played shortstop and left field. He led his team in stolen bases in 1965 and 1966, and in doubles and runs in 1966. Rein had 49 career stolen bases, which stood as a team record until he was surpassed by Roy Marsh in the early 1990s.

In 1965 and 1966, Ohio State participated in the College World Series, and Rein was selected in both years to the All Tournament team. In 1965, the Buckeyes lost the championship game to Arizona State. In 1966, Ohio State won the championship, defeating Oklahoma State. In the championship game, Rein contributed a double.

After he finished his college career, Rein was drafted by the Cleveland Indians. He was playing for the Portland Beavers, the Indians' Triple-A farm team, when Achilles tendon and hamstring problems ended his baseball career.

== Football playing career ==
From 1964 to 1966, Rein was a three-year starter at left halfback for the Ohio State Buckeyes football team. He led his team in receptions in 1964 and 1965, and in rushing in 1966. Rein finished at Ohio State the team career receptions leader. Following his Ohio State career, Rein was drafted by the Baltimore Colts.

Former teammate, and later Mayor of Columbus, Ohio, Greg Lashutka said of Rein, "He wasn't the biggest guy, but pound for pound he was tough as they come. He had that inner drive and did everything to the fullest. He could play." A continuing tradition at Ohio State is that at the end of every season, the team votes to award one teammate the "Bo Rein Most Inspirational Player Award."

== Football coaching career ==
Lou Holtz, a former assistant coach at Ohio State, had taken the head coaching position at William & Mary in 1969, and Holtz offered an assistant coaching job to Rein. When Holtz accepted an offer from North Carolina State University in 1972, Rein went with him. In 1975, Rein was hired as offensive coordinator for the University of Arkansas under Frank Broyles and helped the Razorbacks win the Southwest Conference and the 1976 Cotton Bowl Classic.

When Holtz moved on to New York Jets of the NFL in 1976, Rein became the youngest college football head coach upon his hiring by North Carolina State. Guiding the NC State Wolfpack football team, Rein was an advocate of the coaching philosophy of Ohio State's Woody Hayes for whom Rein played. During Rein's four years at NC State, he led the team to two bowl games, defeating Iowa State in the 1977 Peach Bowl and defeating Pittsburgh in the 1978 Tangerine Bowl. In Rein's final year at NC State, his team won the 1979 Atlantic Coast Conference championship. However, it did not play in a bowl game, having declined an invitation to the Garden State Bowl–to date, the last power conference champion to decline participation in a bowl game.

Among Rein's top players at NC State were Outland Trophy winner Jim Ritcher, a center for the Wolfpack who later started at guard on four Super Bowl teams with the Buffalo Bills, and linebacker Bill Cowher, who later coached the Pittsburgh Steelers for 15 seasons and won Super Bowl XL.

Following every season, the NC State football team awards the "Bo Rein Award" to a player that makes a vital contribution in an unsung role.

== Death ==
Following the 1979 season, Rein was hired away from NC State by Louisiana State University. In January 1980, Rein took a recruiting trip to Shreveport, Louisiana. On his January 10, 1980, return trip back to Baton Rouge, Louisiana, his private aircraft crashed, leaving no survivors. Rein, who was hired at the end of November 1979, had been head coach for less than two months.

Rein and experienced pilot Louis Benscotter left Shreveport in a Cessna 441 aircraft. The flight was planned to be a 40-minute trip, but when Benscotter rerouted east to avoid a storm, air traffic control lost contact with him. The aircraft climbed to 40,000 ft (12,000 m) and kept heading due east. After being tracked on radar, the aircraft was eventually intercepted by U.S. Air National Guard Convair F-106 Delta Dart fighter aircraft over North Carolina, one thousand miles (1,600 km) off-course and at an altitude of 41,600 ft (12,700 m), 6,600 ft (2,000 m) feet higher than its maximum certified ceiling. The military pilots could not see anyone in the cockpit and the aircraft continued on over the Atlantic Ocean, where it crashed after running out of fuel. A US Coast Guard crew spotted some debris, but no wreckage was ever recovered and the bodies of Rein and Benscotter were never found.

The cause of the crash is undetermined but was most likely cabin depressurization causing hypoxia, a lack of oxygen, resulting in the occupants losing consciousness as in the 1999 South Dakota Learjet crash.

In 1982, Rein's widow, Suzanne Kay, reached an out-of-court settlement for an undisclosed amount after filing a $10 million damage suit against a number of defendants, including the Cessna Aircraft Company, Cruse Aviation Inc., who serviced the aircraft, and Nichols Construction Corporation, who owned it.

== Head coaching record ==
=== Football ===
Year	Team	Overall	Conference	Standing	Bowl/playoffs	Coaches^{#}	AP^{°}
NC State Wolfpack (Atlantic Coast Conference) (1976–1979)
1976	NC State	3–7–1	2–3	5th			
1977	NC State	8–4	4–2	T–3rd	W Peach	19	
1978	NC State	9–3	4–2	3rd	W Tangerine	19	18
1979	NC State	7–4	5–1	1st			
NC State:		27–18–1	15–8				
Total:		27–18–1					
National championship Conference title Conference division title or championship game berth
^{#}Rankings from final Coaches Poll.; ^{°}Rankings from final AP Poll.
