= 1978 Virginia Cavaliers football team =

American college football season

1978 Virginia Cavaliers football
- Conference: Atlantic Coast Conference
- Record: 2–9 (0–6 ACC)
- Head coach: Dick Bestwick (3rd season)
- Offensive coordinator: Brian Burke (2nd season)
- Captains: Edward Smith; Derrick Glasper
- Home stadium: Scott Stadium

1978 Atlantic Coast Conference football standings
	Conf.					Overall
Team	W		L		T	W		L		T
No. 6 Clemson $	6	–	0	–	0	11	–	1	–	0
No. 20 Maryland	5	–	1	–	0	9	–	3	–	0
No. 18 NC State	4	–	2	–	0	9	–	3	–	0
North Carolina	3	–	3	–	0	5	–	6	–	0
Duke	2	–	4	–	0	4	–	7	–	0
Wake Forest	1	–	5	–	0	1	–	10	–	0
Virginia	0	–	6	–	0	2	–	9	–	0
$ – Conference champion; Rankings from AP Poll

The 1978 Virginia Cavaliers football team represented the University of Virginia during the 1978 NCAA Division I-A football season. The Cavaliers were led by third-year head coach Dick Bestwick and played their home games at Scott Stadium in Charlottesville, Virginia. They competed as members of the Atlantic Coast Conference, finishing in last.

== Schedule ==
Date	Opponent	Site	Result	Attendance	Source
September 9	at Wake Forest	Groves Stadium; Winston-Salem, NC	L 0–14	21,500	
September 16	Navy*^{†}	Scott Stadium; Charlottesville, VA	L 0–32	28,472	
September 23	at Army*	Michie Stadium; West Point, NY	W 21–17	26,473	
September 30	VMI*	Scott Stadium; Charlottesville, VA	L 9–17	21,150	
October 7	at Duke	Wallace Wade Stadium; Durham, NC	L 13–20	20,375	
October 14	Clemson	Scott Stadium; Charlottesville, VA	L 14–30	19,243	
October 21	Virginia Tech*	Scott Stadium; Charlottesville, VA (rivalry)	W 17–7	34,275	
November 4	at West Virginia*	Mountaineer Field; Morgantown, WV	L 17–20	29,291	
November 11	No. 13 Maryland	Scott Stadium; Charlottesville, VA (rivalry)	L 7–17	19,874	
November 18	at North Carolina	Kenan Memorial Stadium; Chapel Hill, NC (South's Oldest Rivalry)	L 20–38	44,000	
November 25	NC State	Scott Stadium; Charlottesville, VA	L 21–24	14,227	
*Non-conference game; ^{†}Homecoming; Rankings from AP Poll released prior to the game
