= 1978 William & Mary Tribe football team =

American college football season

1978 William & Mary Tribe football
- Conference: Independent
- Record: 5–5–1
- Head coach: Jim Root (7th season)
- Defensive coordinator: Ralph Kirchenheiter (1st season)
- Captains: Melvin Martin; Jim Ryan; Tom Rozantz
- Home stadium: Cary Field

1978 NCAA Division I-A independents football records
	Conf.					Overall
Team	W		L		T	W		L		T
No. 4 Penn State		–		–		11	–	1	–	0
North Texas State		–		–		9	–	2	–	0
East Carolina		–		–		9	–	3	–	0
Navy		–		–		9	–	3	–	0
No. 7 Notre Dame		–		–		9	–	3	–	0
Rutgers		–		–		9	–	3	–	0
Florida State		–		–		8	–	3	–	0
Tennessee State		–		–		8	–	3	–	0
Temple		–		–		7	–	3	–	1
Pittsburgh		–		–		8	–	4	–	0
Holy Cross		–		–		7	–	4	–	0
Louisville		–		–		7	–	4	–	0
UNLV		–		–		7	–	4	–	0
Southern Miss		–		–		7	–	4	–	0
Northeast Louisiana		–		–		6	–	4	–	1
Georgia Tech		–		–		7	–	5	–	0
Hawaii		–		–		6	–	5	–	0
Miami (FL)		–		–		6	–	5	–	0
South Carolina		–		–		5	–	5	–	1
William & Mary		–		–		5	–	5	–	1
Cincinnati		–		–		5	–	6	–	0
Villanova		–		–		5	–	6	–	0
Army		–		–		4	–	6	–	1
Memphis State		–		–		4	–	7	–	0
Tulane		–		–		4	–	7	–	0
Virginia Tech		–		–		4	–	7	–	0
Air Force		–		–		3	–	8	–	0
Colgate		–		–		3	–	8	–	0
Richmond		–		–		3	–	8	–	0
Syracuse		–		–		3	–	8	–	0
Illinois State		–		–		2	–	9	–	0
West Virginia		–		–		2	–	9	–	0
Boston College		–		–		0	–	11	–	0
Rankings from AP Poll

The 1978 William & Mary Tribe football team represented the College of William & Mary as an independent during the 1978 NCAA Division I-A football season. Led by Jim Root in his seventh year as head coach, William & Mary finished the season with a record of 5–5–1.

== Schedule ==
Date	Opponent	Site	Result	Attendance	Source
September 9	VMI	Cary Field; Williamsburg, VA (rivalry)	W 10–3	14,100	
September 16	at Connecticut	Memorial Stadium; Storrs, CT	W 27–3	5,030	
September 23	at Villanova	Villanova Stadium; Villanova, PA	W 21–17	9,000	
September 30	at Virginia Tech	Lane Stadium; Blacksburg, VA	L 19–22	34,000	
October 7	Temple	Cary Field; Williamsburg, VA	T 22–22	13,000	
October 14	James Madison	Cary Field; Williamsburg, VA (rivalry)	W 32–7	14,200–15,000	
October 21	at No. 17 Navy	Navy–Marine Corps Memorial Stadium; Annapolis, MD	L 0–9	20,193	
October 28	at Louisville	Fairgrounds Stadium; Louisville, KY	L 21–33	17,879	
November 4	The Citadel	Cary Field; Williamsburg, VA	W 12–8	8,800	
November 11	at East Carolina	Ficklen Stadium; Greenville, NC	L 3–20	26,231	
November 18	at Richmond	City Stadium; Richmond, VA (rivalry)	L 3–17	17,500	
Rankings from AP Poll released prior to the game
