= Syracuse Orange football statistical leaders =

The Syracuse Orange football statistical leaders are individual statistical leaders of the Syracuse Orange football program in various categories, including passing, rushing, receiving, total offense, defensive stats, and kicking. Within those areas, the lists identify single-game, single-season, and career leaders. The Orange represent Syracuse University in the NCAA's Atlantic Coast Conference.

Although Syracuse began competing in intercollegiate football in 1889, the school's official record book considers the "modern era" to have begun in 1946. Records from before this year are often incomplete and inconsistent, and they are generally not included in these lists.

These lists are dominated by more recent players for several reasons:

- Since 1946, seasons have increased from 10 games to 11 and then 12 games in length.
- The NCAA didn't allow freshmen to play varsity football until 1972 (with the exception of the World War II years), allowing players to have four-year careers.
- Bowl games only began counting toward single-season and career statistics in 2002. The Orange have played in five bowl games since then, giving many recent players an extra game to accumulate statistics.

These lists are updated through Week 12 of the 2026 season. Active players are listed in bold.

== Passing ==
=== Passing yards ===
Career
Rk	Player	Yards	Years
1	Eric Dungey	9,340	2015 2016 2017 2018
2	Ryan Nassib	9,190	2009 2010 2011 2012
3	Marvin Graves	8,466	1990 1991 1992 1993
4	Donovan McNabb	8,389	1995 1996 1997 1998
5	Don McPherson	5,812	1984 1985 1986 1987
6	Garrett Shrader	5,771	2021 2022 2023
7	Perry Patterson	5,220	2003 2004 2005 2006
8	Kyle McCord	4,779	2024
9	R. J. Anderson	4,698	2000 2001 2002 2003
10	Troy Nunes	4,578	1999 2000 2001 2002

Single season
Rk	Player	Yards	Year
1	Kyle McCord	4,779	2024
2	Ryan Nassib	3,749	2012
3	Eric Dungey	2,868	2018
4	Ryan Nassib	2,685	2011
5	Eric Dungey	2,679	2016
6	Garrett Shrader	2,640	2022
7	Marvin Graves	2,547	1993
8	Eric Dungey	2,495	2017
9	Donovan McNabb	2,488	1997
10	Tommy DeVito	2,360	2019

Single game
Rk	Player	Yards	Year	Opponent
1	Ryan Nassib	482	2012	Northwestern
2	Kyle McCord	470	2024	UConn
3	Kyle McCord	453	2024	Washington State
4	Zack Mahoney	440	2016	Pittsburgh
5	Eric Dungey	434	2016	Boston College
6	Marvin Graves	425	1992	Rutgers
7	Andrew Robinson	423	2007	Louisville
8	Andrew Robinson	419	2007	Cincinnati
9	Steve Angeli	417	2025	Colgate
10	Steve Angeli	416	2025	Connecticut

=== Passing touchdowns ===
Career
Rk	Player	TDs	Years
1	Donovan McNabb	77	1995 1996 1997 1998
2	Ryan Nassib	70	2009 2010 2011 2012
3	Eric Dungey	58	2015 2016 2017 2018
4	Marvin Graves	48	1990 1991 1992 1993
5	Don McPherson	46	1984 1985 1986 1987
6	Garrett Shrader	39	2021 2022 2023
7	Kyle McCord	34	2024
8	Troy Nunes	32	1999 2000 2001 2002
9	Tommy Devito	28	2018 2019 2020 2021
10	Perry Patterson	25	2003 2004 2005 2006

Single season
Rk	Player	TDs	Year
1	Kyle McCord	34	2024
2	Ryan Nassib	26	2012
3	Don McPherson	22	1987
	Donovan McNabb	22	1998
	Ryan Nassib	22	2011
6	Donovan McNabb	20	1997
7	Donovan McNabb	19	1996
	Ryan Nassib	19	2010
	Tommy Devito	19	2019
10	Eric Dungey	18	2018

Single game
Rk	Player	TDs	Year	Opponent
1	Ryan Nassib	5	2010	Maine
	Zack Mahoney	5	2016	Pittsburgh
	Eric Dungey	5	2018	Wagner
	Kyle McCord	5	2024	Washington State
	Steve Angeli	5	2025	Colgate
	Amari Odom	5	2026	UConn

== Rushing ==
=== Rushing yards ===
Career
Rk	Player	Yards	Years
1	Joe Morris	4,299	1978 1979 1980 1981
2	Walter Reyes	3,424	2001 2002 2003 2004
3	Sean Tucker	3,182	2020 2021 2022
4	Delone Carter	3,104	2006 2008 2009 2010
5	Larry Csonka	2,934	1965 1966 1967
6	James Mungro	2,869	1998 1999 2000 2001
7	Floyd Little	2,704	1964 1965 1966
8	David Walker	2,643	1989 1990 1991 1992
9	Dee Brown	2,626	1997 1998 1999 2000
10	Moe Neal	2,560	2016 2017 2018 2019

Single season
Rk	Player	Yards	Year
1	Sean Tucker	1,496	2021
2	Joe Morris	1,372	1979
3	Walter Reyes	1,347	2003
4	Delone Carter	1,233	2010
5	Joe Morris	1,194	1981
6	Jerome Smith	1,171	2012
7	James Mungro	1,170	2001
8	Curtis Brinkley	1,164	2008
9	Walter Reyes	1,135	2002
10	Larry Csonka	1,127	1967

Single game
Rk	Player	Yards	Year	Opponent
1	Joe Morris	252	1979	Kansas
2	Walter Reyes	241	2003	UCF
3	Dee Brown	239	2000	Rutgers
4	Walter Reyes	237	2004	Rutgers
5	Damien Rhodes	236	2005	Buffalo
6	Sean Tucker	232	2022	Wagner
7	Larry Csonka	216	1965	West Virginia
	Floyd Little	216	1966	Tennessee
9	Prince-Tyson Gulley	213	2012	West Virginia
10	Sean Tucker	207	2021	Boston College

=== Rushing touchdowns ===
Career
Rk	Player	TDs	Years
1	Walter Reyes	45	2001 2002 2003 2004
2	Floyd Little	35	1964 1965 1966
	Eric Dungey	35	2015 2016 2017 2018
4	Garrett Shrader	31	2021 2022 2023
5	James Mungro	29	1998 1999 2000 2001
6	Ernie Davis	28	1959 1960 1961
	Dee Brown	28	1997 1998 1999 2000
8	Sean Tucker	27	2020 2021 2022
9	Joe Morris	25	1978 1979 1980 1981
10	Damien Rhodes	24	2002 2003 2004 2005
	Delone Carter	24	2006 2008 2009 2010
	LeQuint Allen	24	2022 2023 2024

Single season
Rk	Player	TDs	Year
1	Walter Reyes	20	2003
2	Walter Reyes	17	2002
3	LeQuint Allen	16	2024
4	Eric Dungey	15	2018
5	Floyd Little	14	1965
	James Mungro	14	2001
	Garrett Shrader	14	2021
8	Jim Brown	13	1956
	Jim Nance	13	1964
10	Ernie Davis	12	1961
	Floyd Little	12	1966
	Bill Hurley	12	1979
	Jerome Smith	12	2013
	Sean Tucker	12	2021

Single game
Rk	Player	TDs	Year	Opponent
1	Jim Brown	6	1956	Colgate
2	Floyd Little	5	1964	Kansas
	Walter Reyes	5	2003	Notre Dame
4	Floyd Little	4	1965	West Virginia
	David Walker	4	1991	Pittsburgh
	Walter Reyes	4	2003	Central Florida
	Damien Rhodes	4	2005	Buffalo
	Delone Carter	4	2006	Wyoming
	Delone Carter	4	2010	Colgate
	Sean Tucker	4	2021	Albany
	Garrett Shrader	4	2023	Purdue

== Receiving ==
=== Receptions ===
Career
Rk	Player	Rec	Years
1	Ervin Philips	223	2014 2015 2016 2017
2	Steve Ishmael	219	2014 2015 2016 2017
3	Alec Lemon	201	2009 2010 2011 2012
4	Taj Harris	151	2018 2019 2020 2021
5	Oronde Gadsden II	143	2021 2022 2023 2024
6	Scott Schwedes	139	1983 1984 1985 1986
	Shelby Hill	139	1990 1991 1992 1993
8	Marvin Harrison	135	1992 1993 1994 1995
9	Jarrod West	134	2011 2012 2013 2014
10	Mike Williams	133	2006 2007 2009

Single season
Rk	Player	Rec	Year
1	Steve Ishmael	105	2017
2	Amba Etta-Tawo	94	2016
3	Ervin Philips	90	2016
4	Ervin Philips	89	2017
5	Trebor Pena	84	2024
6	Jackson Meeks	78	2024
7	**Umari Hatcher**	77	2026
8	Oronde Gadsden II	73	2024
9	Alec Lemon	72	2012
10	Alec Lemon	68	2011

Single game
Rk	Player	Rec	Year	Opponent
1	Ervin Philips	17	2017	NC State
	Calvin Russell III	17	2026	NC State
2	Art Monk	14	1977	Navy
	Ervin Philips	14	2016	Colgate
	Steve Ishmael	14	2017	Middle Tennessee State
	Steve Ishmael	14	2017	Wake Forest
6	Mike Williams	13	2009	South Florida
	Amba Etta-Tawo	13	2016	Pittsburgh
	Taj Harris	13	2020	NC State
	Umari Hatcher	13	2026	Louisville

=== Receiving yards ===
Career
Rk	Player	Yards	Years
1	Steve Ishmael	2,891	2014 2015 2016 2017
2	Marvin Harrison	2,728	1992 1993 1994 1995
3	Alec Lemon	2,596	2009 2010 2011 2012
4	Shelby Hill	2,296	1990 1991 1992 1993
5	Rob Moore	2,122	1987 1988 1989
6	Scott Schwedes	2,111	1983 1984 1985 1986
7	**Umari Hatcher**	2,054	2023 2024 2025 2026
8	Mike Williams	2,044	2006 2007 2009
9	Taj Harris	2,028	2018 2019 2020 2021
10	Oronde Gadsden II	1,994	2021 2022 2023 2024

Single season
Rk	Player	Yards	Year
1	Amba Etta-Tawo	1,482	2016
2	Steve Ishmael	1,347	2017
3	**Umari Hatcher**	1,257	2026
4	Marvin Harrison	1,131	1995
5	Alec Lemon	1,070	2012
6	Rob Moore	1,064	1989
7	Trishton Jackson	1,023	2019
8	Jackson Meeks	1,021	2024
9	Oronde Gadsden II	969	2022
10	Tommy Kane	968	1987

Single game
Rk	Player	Yards	Year	Opponent
1	Amba Etta-Tawo	270	2016	Connecticut
2	Scott Schwedes	249	1985	Boston College
3	Alec Lemon	244	2012	Missouri
4	David Tyree	229	2002	Virginia Tech
5	Umari Hatcher	224	2026	Louisville
6	Marvin Harrison	213	1995	West Virginia
7	Amba Etta-Tawo	210	2016	Colgate
8	Mike Williams	209	2009	Northwestern
9	Kevin Johnson	196	1998	West Virginia
10	Tommy Kane	193	1987	Colgate

=== Receiving touchdowns ===
Career
Rk	Player	TDs	Years
1	Rob Moore	22	1987 1988 1989
2	Marvin Harrison	20	1992 1993 1994 1995
	Mike Williams	20	2006 2007 2009
4	Alec Lemon	18	2009 2010 2011 2012
	Steve Ishmael	18	2014 2015 2016 2017
6	Tommy Kane	17	1985 1986 1987
7	Scott Schwedes	16	1983 1984 1985 1986
	**Umari Hatcher**	16	2022 2023 2024 2026
	Marcus Sales	16	2008 2009 2010 2012
10	Quinton Spotwood	15	1996 1997 1998 1999

Single season
Rk	Player	TDs	Year
1	Tommy Kane	14	1987
	Amba Etta-Tawo	14	2016
3	Rob Moore	11	1988
	Trishton Jackson	11	2019
5	Mike Williams	10	2007
6	Rob Moore	9	1989
	**Umari Hatcher**	9	2026
	Kevin Johnson	9	1998
	Trebor Pena	9	2024
10	Mike Siano	8	1985
	Marvin Harrison	8	1995
	Quinton Spotwood	8	1997
	Marcus Sales	8	2012

Single game
Rk	Player	TDs	Year	Opponent
1	Amba Etta-Tawo	5	2016	Pittsburgh
2	Tony Gabriel	4	1970	Miami
	Tommy Kane	4	1987	Colgate
4	Mike Siano	3	1985	Rutgers
	Rob Moore	3	1988	Virginia Tech
	Rob Moore	3	1988	Rutgers
	Deval Glover	3	1988	Boston College
	Marcus Sales	3	2010	Kansas State
	Nick Provo	3	2011	West Virginia
	Umari Hatcher	3	2026	UConn

== Total offense ==
Total offense is the sum of passing and rushing statistics. It does not include receiving or returns.

=== Total offense yards ===
Career
Rk	Player	Yards	Years
1	Eric Dungey	11,333	2015 2016 2017 2018
2	Donovan McNabb	9,950	1995 1996 1997 1998
3	Ryan Nassib	9,358	2009 2010 2011 2012
4	Marvin Graves	8,755	1990 1991 1992 1993
5	Garrett Shrader	7,474	2021 2022 2023
6	Don McPherson	7,063	1984 1985 1986 1987
7	Bill Hurley	5,949	1975 1976 1977 1978 1979
8	R. J. Anderson	5,347	2000 2001 2002 2003
9	Perry Patterson	5,180	2003 2004 2005 2006
10	Troy Nunes	4,880	1999 2000 2001 2002

Single season
Rk	Player	Yards	Year
1	Kyle McCord	4,714	2024
2	Ryan Nassib	3,891	2012
3	Eric Dungey	3,622	2018
4	Garrett Shrader	3,093	2022
5	Eric Dungey	3,090	2017
6	Eric Dungey	2,972	2016
7	Donovan McNabb	2,892	1997
8	Ryan Nassib	2,724	2011
9	Marvin Graves	2,696	1993
10	Don McPherson	2,540	1987

Single game
Rk	Player	Yards	Year	Opponent
1	Ryan Nassib	512	2012	Northwestern
2	Zack Mahoney	489	2016	Pittsburgh
3	Eric Dungey	488	2016	Boston College
4	Marvin Graves	476	1992	Rutgers
5	Kyle McCord	471	2024	UConn
6	Kyle McCord	446	2024	Washington State
7	Eric Dungey	443	2018	NC State
8	Steve Angeli	438	2025	Colgate
9	Andrew Robinson	421	2007	Louisville
10	Eric Dungey	417	2016	Virginia Tech

=== Touchdowns responsible for ===
"Touchdowns responsible for" is the NCAA's official term for combined passing and rushing touchdowns.

Career
Rk	Player	TDs	Years
1	Donovan McNabb	96	1995 1996 1997 1998
2	Eric Dungey	93	2015 2016 2017 2018
3	Ryan Nassib	75	2009 2010 2011 2012
4	Garrett Shrader	70	2021 2022 2023
5	Don McPherson	65	1984 1985 1986 1987
	Marvin Graves	65	1990 1991 1992 1993
7	Walter Reyes	45	2001 2002 2003 2004
8	Bill Hurley	38	1975 1976 1977 1978 1979
	Troy Nunes	38	1999 2000 2001 2002
10	Kyle McCord	37	2024

Single season
Rk	Player	TDs	Year
1	Kyle McCord	37	2024
2	Eric Dungey	33	2018
3	Donovan McNabb	30	1998
4	Don McPherson	28	1987
	Ryan Nassib	28	2012
6	Donovan McNabb	26	1997
	Garrett Shrader	26	2022
8	Ryan Nassib	24	2011
9	Eric Dungey	23	2017
	Garrett Shrader	23	2021

Single game
Rk	Player	TDs	Year	Opponent
1	Zack Mahoney	7	2016	Pittsburgh
2	Jim Brown	6	1956	Colgate
	Eric Dungey	6	2018	Boston College
	Steve Angeli	6	2025	Colgate
	Amari Odom	6	2026	UConn

== Defense ==
=== Interceptions ===
Career
Rk	Player	Ints	Years
1	Markus Paul	19	1985 1986 1987 1988
2	Tommy Myers	18	1969 1970 1971
3	Anthony Smith	14	2002 2003 2004 2005
4	Walt Slovenski	13	1946 1947 1948
	Andre Cisco	13	2018 2019 2020
6	Avatus Stone	12	1950 1951
	Cliff Ensley	12	1966 1967 1968
	Ron Hobby	12	1981 1982 1983 1984
	Donovin Darius	12	1994 1995 1996 1997
10	Jimmy Ridlon	11	1954 1955 1956

Single season
Rk	Player	Ints	Year
1	Tommy Myers	8	1971
2	Avatus Stone	7	1950
	Markus Paul	7	1985
	Rob Thomson	7	1989
	Donovin Darius	7	1997
	Andre Cisco	7	2018

Single game
Rk	Player	Ints	Year	Opponent
1	Avatus Stone	3	1950	Penn State
	Tommy Myers	3	1970	Penn State
	Markus Paul	3	1985	Temple

=== Tackles ===
Career
Rk	Player	Tackles	Years
1	Jim Collins	624	1976 1978 1979 1980
2	Tony Romano	578	1980 1981 1982 1983
3	Rudy Reed	536	1982 1983 1984 1985
4	Antwaune Ponds	442	1994 1995 1996 1997
5	Clifton Smith	405	1999 2000 2001 2002
6	David Bavaro	402	1986 1987 1988 1989
7	Donovin Darius	379	1994 1995 1996 1997
8	Keith Bulluck	375	1996 1997 1998 1999
9	Glen Young	361	1989 1990 1991 1992
10	Mike Zunic	349	1978 1979 1980 1981

Single season
Rk	Player	Tackles	Year
1	Jim Collins	229	1979
2	Tony Romano	198	1982
3	Jim Collins	189	1978
4	Tony Romano	177	1981
5	Rudy Reed	172	1984
6	Tony Romano	169	1983
7	Tim Pidgeon	164	1985
8	Tim Pidgeon	158	1986
9	Rudy Reed	152	1985
10	Bernard King	151	1984

Single game
Rk	Player	Tackles	Year	Opponent
1	Jim Collins	42	1979	Penn State
2	Jim Collins	28	1979	West Virginia
3	Tony Romano	27	1982	Pittsburgh
4	Jim Collins	25	1980	Kansas
	Mike Gyetvay	25	1981	Penn State
6	Jim Collins	24	1979	Navy
	Tony Romano	24	1981	Navy
	Tim Pidgeon	24	1986	Mississippi State
	Derek Ward	24	1986	Rutgers
10	Mike Gyetvay	23	1981	West Virginia
	Rudy Reed	23	1985	Virginia Tech

=== Sacks ===
Career
Rk	Player	Sacks	Years
1	Tim Green	45.5	1982 1983 1984 1985
2	Dwight Freeney	34.0	1998 1999 2000 2001
3	Duke Pettijohn	24.5	1997 1998 1999 2000
4	Terry Wooden	23.0	1986 1987 1988 1989
	Marlowe Wax	23.0	2020 2021 2022 2023 2024
6	Kevin Mitchell	21.0	1990 1991 1992 1993
7	Jamie Kimmel	20.5	1980 1981 1982 1983 1984
8	Louis Gachelin	18.5	2000 2001 2002 2003
	Alton Robinson	18.5	2017 2018 2019
10	Rob Burnett	18.0	1986 1987 1988 1989

Single season
Rk	Player	Sacks	Year
1	Dwight Freeney	17.5	2001
2	Tim Green	15.0	1984
3	Tim Green	14.5	1983
4	Tim Green	13.5	1985
5	Dwight Freeney	13.0	2000
6	Jamie Kimmel	11.0	1983
	Jerry Kimmel	11.0	1985
	Rob Burnett	11.0	1987
9	Duke Pettijohn	10.5	1999
10	Jay Bromley	10.0	2013
	Kendall Coleman	10.0	2018
	Alton Robinson	10.0	2018

Single game
Rk	Player	Sacks	Year	Opponent
1	Dwight Freeney	4.5	2000	Virginia Tech
2	Tim Green	4.0	1985	Virginia Tech
	Rob Burnett	4.0	1987	Pittsburgh
	Antwaune Ponds	4.0	1996	West Virginia
	Duke Pettijohn	4.0	1999	Pittsburgh
	Brandon Sharpe	4.0	2012	Pittsburgh
7	Doug Hogue	3.5	2009	Rutgers

== Kicking ==
=== Field goals made ===
Career
Rk	Player	FGs	Years
1	Andre Szmyt	85	2018 2019 2020 2021 2022
2	John Biskup	57	1989 1990 1991 1992
3	Dave Jacobs	53	1975 1976 1977 1978
4	Nate Trout	49	1996 1997 1998 1999
5	Ross Krautman	49	2010 2011 2012 2013
6	Don McAulay	47	1983 1984 1985
7	Gary Anderson	42	1979 1980 1981
	Collin Barber	42	2001 2002 2003 2004
9	Patrick Shadle	40	2006 2007 2008
10	Cole Murphy	39	2014 2015 2016

Single season
Rk	Player	FGs	Year
1	Andre Szmyt	30	2018
2	Andre Szmyt	20	2022
3	Gary Anderson	18	1981
	Ross Krautman	18	2010
5	Don McAulay	17	1985
	John Biskup	17	1991
	Andre Szmyt	17	2019
8	Dave Jacobs	16	1977
	Dave Jacobs	16	1978
	John Biskup	16	1992
	Patrick Shadle	16	2006
	Cole Murphy	16	2015

Single game
Rk	Player	FGs	Year	Opponent
1	Don McAulay	5	1983	Kent State
	Andre Szmyt	5	2022	Virginia

=== Field goal percentage ===
Career
Rk	Player	FG%	Years
1	Tripp Woody	85.7%	2025
2	Andre Szmyt	81.0%	2018 2019 2020 2021 2022
3	Patrick Shadle	80.0%	2006 2007 2008
4	Ross Krautman	77.8%	2010 2011 2012 2013
5	Tim Vesling	75.7%	1985 1986 1987
6	Nate Trout	75.4%	1996 1997 1998 1999
7	Gary Anderson	75.0%	1979 1980 1981
8	Don McAulay	74.6%	1983 1984 1985
9	John Biskup	73.1%	1989 1990 1991 1992
10	Cole Murphy	69.6%	2014 2015 2016

Single season
Rk	Player	FG%	Year
1	Gary Anderson	94.7%	1981
	Ross Krautman	94.7%	2010
3	Patrick Shadle	88.9%	2006
4	Kevin Greene	88.2%	1988
	Andre Szmyt	88.2%	2018
6	Tripp Woody	85.7%	2025
7	Andre Szmyt	85.0%	2019
8	Tim Vesling	83.3%	1987
9	Patrick Shadle	82.4%	2008
10	Andre Szmyt	81.8%	2020
