= List of Syracuse Orange in the NFL draft =

This is a list of Syracuse Orange football players in the NFL draft.

== Key ==
B	Back	K	Kicker	NT	Nose tackle
C	Center	LB	Linebacker	FB	Fullback
DB	Defensive back	P	Punter	HB	Halfback
DE	Defensive end	QB	Quarterback	WR	Wide receiver
DT	Defensive tackle	RB	Running back	G	Guard
E	End	T	Offensive tackle	TE	Tight end

== Selections ==
Year	Round	Pick	Overall	Player	Team	Position
1936	5	9	45	Ed Jontos	New York Giants	G
1943	15	10	140	Dick Weber	Washington Redskins	G
1943	26	10	250	Paul Berthold	Washington Redskins	E
1944	20	9	206	Norm Michael	Philadelphia Eagles	B
1945	12	8	117	Paul McKee	Washington Redskins	E
1945	16	9	162	Howard Werner	Philadelphia Eagles	E
1945	18	4	179	Dolph Czekala	Boston Yanks	T
1946	22	9	209	Roger Robinson	Washington Redskins	B
1947	7	2	47	Joe Watt	Boston Yanks	B
1950	25	1	314	Jim Pepper	Baltimore Colts	G
1951	11	12	135	Bernie Custis	Cleveland Browns	B
1953	7	6	79	Jim Ringo	Green Bay Packers	C
1953	9	3	100	Avatus Stone	Chicago Cardinals	B
1953	16	7	188	Bill Skyinskus	New York Giants	G
1953	23	12	277	Carl Karilivacz	Detroit Lions	B
1953	25	1	290	Joe Szombathy	Baltimore Colts	E
1953	26	9	310	Bill Wetzel	New York Giants	B
1954	2	2	15	Bob Fleck	Green Bay Packers	T
1954	2	6	19	Pat Stark	Pittsburgh Steelers	B
1954	4	6	43	Lester McClelland	Los Angeles Rams	T
1954	11	4	125	Bob Leberman	Baltimore Colts	B
1954	26	12	313	Jim George	Detroit Lions	T
1955	3	3	28	Ray Perkins	Washington Redskins	B
1956	23	12	277	Don Althouse	Cleveland Browns	E
1957	1	6	6	Jim Brown	Cleveland Browns	RB
1957	4	2	39	Jimmy Ridlon	San Francisco 49ers	B
1957	9	11	108	Bill Brown	Chicago Bears	G
1957	14	1	158	Jerry Cashman	Philadelphia Eagles	T
1958	6	7	68	Dick Lasse	Pittsburgh Steelers	E
1958	8	1	86	Mike Bill	Green Bay Packers	C
1958	12	9	142	Gerry Hershey	New York Giants	T
1958	18	1	206	Chuck Strid	Green Bay Packers	G
1958	19	8	225	Ernie Johnson	New York Giants	B
1958	29	5	342	Ed Coffin	Washington Redskins	B
1959	3	12	36	Ron Luciano	Detroit Lions	T
1959	6	2	62	Al Benecick	Philadelphia Eagles	G
1959	9	9	105	Maury Youmans	Chicago Bears	T
1959	11	12	132	Tom Stephens	Baltimore Colts	B
1959	25	12	300	Ed Kieffer	Baltimore Colts	B
1959	26	5	305	Gene Grabosky	Washington Redskins	T
1960	1	7	7	Roger Davis	Chicago Bears	G
1960	4	11	47	Gerhard Schwedes	Baltimore Colts	RB
1960	7	12	84	Bob Yates	New York Giants	T
1960	17	12	204	Dave Baker	New York Giants	E
1961	1	14	14	Art Baker	Philadelphia Eagles	RB
1961	2	7	21	Tom Gilburg	Baltimore Colts	T
1961	2	11	25	Bruce Tarbox	New York Giants	G
1961	4	13	55	John Brown	Cleveland Browns	T
1961	5	3	59	Fred Mautino	Pittsburgh Steelers	E
1961	7	10	94	Al Bemiller	St. Louis Cardinals	C
1961	10	13	139	Ken Ericson	Cleveland Browns	E
1962	1	1	1	Ernie Davis	Washington Redskins	RB
1962	8	9	107	Pete Brokaw	Baltimore Colts	B
1962	10	5	131	George Fracovitch	St. Louis Cardinals	G
1962	12	3	157	Gary Fallon	Minnesota Vikings	RB
1962	14	8	190	Dick Easterly	San Francisco 49ers	B
1962	19	13	265	Bob Stern	New York Giants	C
1963	2	5	19	John Mackey	Baltimore Colts	TE
1963	6	13	83	Don King	Detroit Lions	B
1963	8	9	107	Walt Sweeney	Cleveland Browns	E
1963	17	2	226	Dave Meggyesy	St. Louis Cardinals	LB
1964	6	8	78	Jim Majurek	Baltimore Colts	T
1964	6	10	80	Dick Bowman	St. Louis Cardinals	E
1964	11	8	148	John Paglio	Baltimore Colts	T
1964	13	11	179	Bob Meehan	Cleveland Browns	G
1964	14	10	192	Len Slaby	St. Louis Cardinals	C
1964	20	12	278	Dave Archer	Cleveland Browns	T
1965	4	3	45	Jim Nance	Chicago Bears	RB
1965	4	10	52	Wall Mahle	Green Bay Packers	B
1965	5	14	70	John McGuire	Baltimore Colts	WR
1966	2	12	28	Charlie Brown	Chicago Bears	DB
1966	3	3	35	Pat Killorin	Pittsburgh Steelers	C
1966	14	7	207	Howard McCard	New York Giants	G
1967	1	6	6	Floyd Little	Denver Broncos	RB
1967	4	22	102	Gary Bugenhagen	Buffalo Bills	T
1967	15	16	383	Bill Wosilius	St. Louis Cardinals	LB
1968	1	8	8	Larry Csonka	Miami Dolphins	RB
1968	11	14	287	Dennis Fitzgibbons	San Francisco 49ers	G
1968	12	5	305	Jim Cheyunski	New England Patriots	LB
1969	1	22	22	Art Thoms	Oakland Raiders	DT
1969	5	7	111	Tony Kyasky	New Orleans Saints	DB
1970	4	16	94	Bill Maddox	San Diego Chargers	TE
1970	11	15	275	Jack Protz	San Diego Chargers	LB
1971	5	13	117	Ray White	San Diego Chargers	LB
1972	2	11	37	Dan Yochum	Philadelphia Eagles	T
1972	3	22	74	Tom Myers	New Orleans Saints	DB
1972	9	2	210	Stan Walters	Cincinnati Bengals	T
1973	1	10	10	Joe Ehrmann	Baltimore Colts	DT
1973	9	18	226	Roger Praetorius	San Francisco 49ers	RB
1973	16	9	399	Marty Januszkiewicz	Baltimore Colts	RB
1974	3	9	61	Dave Lapham	Cincinnati Bengals	G
1974	7	21	177	Ken Sawyer	Cincinnati Bengals	DB
1976	9	22	259	Lonnie Allgood	Cincinnati Bengals	WR
1976	10	15	280	Keith Moody	Buffalo Bills	DB
1976	11	4	295	Ray Preston	San Diego Chargers	LB
1977	6	10	149	Tim Moresco	Green Bay Packers	DB
1977	8	19	214	Jose St. Victor	Cincinnati Bengals	G
1978	5	28	138	Rich Rosen	Dallas Cowboys	G
1979	12	22	325	Dave Jacobs	Denver Broncos	K
1980	1	18	18	Art Monk	Washington Redskins	WR
1980	4	27	110	Bill Hurley	Pittsburgh Steelers	DB
1980	5	28	138	Craig Wolfley	Pittsburgh Steelers	G
1981	2	15	43	Jim Collins	Los Angeles Rams	LB
1981	6	3	141	Andrew Gissinger	San Diego Chargers	T
1982	2	18	45	Joe Morris	New York Giants	RB
1982	6	28	167	Craig Bingham	Pittsburgh Steelers	LB
1982	7	4	171	Gary Anderson	Buffalo Bills	K
1983	2	27	55	Mike Charles	Miami Dolphins	DT
1984	2	7	35	Blaise Winter	Indianapolis Colts	DT
1984	10	13	265	Brent Ziegler	Cincinnati Bengals	RB
1985	4	23	107	Jamie Kimmel	Los Angeles Raiders	LB
1985	9	3	227	Jamie Covington	Minnesota Vikings	RB
1985	10	13	265	Bernard King	Cincinnati Bengals	LB
1986	1	17	17	Tim Green	Atlanta Falcons	LB
1986	6	26	164	Doug Marrone	Los Angeles Raiders	T
1986	9	7	228	Bob Brotzki	Indianapolis Colts	T
1986	10	19	268	Jerry Kimmel	New York Giants	LB
1986	12	27	332	Don McAulay	New England Patriots	K
1987	2	28	56	Scott Schwedes	Miami Dolphins	WR
1987	9	14	237	Tim Pidgeon	Miami Dolphins	LB
1987	12	5	312	Wes Dove	Seattle Seahawks	DE
1988	1	26	26	Ted Gregory	Denver Broncos	DT
1988	3	20	75	Tommy Kane	Seattle Seahawks	WR
1988	6	9	146	Paul Frase	New York Jets	DE
1988	6	12	149	Don McPherson	Philadelphia Eagles	QB
1988	7	9	174	Pat Kelly	Denver Broncos	TE
1988	12	22	327	Tim Vesling	Indianapolis Colts	K
1989	2	11	39	Daryl Johnston	Dallas Cowboys	RB
1989	3	20	76	Robert Drummond	Philadelphia Eagles	RB
1989	4	8	92	David Holmes	Miami Dolphins	DB
1989	4	11	95	Markus Paul	Chicago Bears	DB
1989	9	8	231	Pat Davis	San Diego Chargers	TE
1989	10	10	259	Deval Glover	Miami Dolphins	WR
1990	2	4	29	Terry Wooden	Seattle Seahawks	LB
1990	5	20	129	Rob Burnett	Cleveland Browns	DE
1990	7	16	181	Fred DeRiggi	Buffalo Bills	DT
1990	9	5	225	David Bavaro	Phoenix Cardinals	LB
1990	9	15	235	Michael Owens	Kansas City Chiefs	RB
1991	2	17	44	John Flannery	Houston Oilers	C
1991	4	26	109	Rob Carpenter	Cincinnati Bengals	WR
1991	8	2	197	Frank Conover	Cleveland Browns	DT
1992	10	13	265	George Rooks	New York Giants	DE
1993	2	23	52	Qadry Ismail	Minnesota Vikings	WR
1993	3	5	61	Chris Gedney	Chicago Bears	TE
1994	2	24	53	Kevin Mitchell	San Francisco 49ers	LB
1994	5	4	135	Patt O'Neill	New England Patriots	P
1995	3	5	69	Melvin Tuten	Cincinnati Bengals	T
1995	4	14	112	Dave Wohlabaugh	New England Patriots	C
1996	1	19	19	Marvin Harrison	Indianapolis Colts	WR
1997	2	24	54	Kevin Abrams	Detroit Lions	DB
1997	4	5	101	Antonio Anderson	Dallas Cowboys	DT
1998	1	22	22	Tebucky Jones	New England Patriots	DB
1998	1	25	25	Donovin Darius	Jacksonville Jaguars	DB
1998	4	6	98	Roland Williams	Los Angeles Rams	TE
1998	7	17	206	Antwaune Ponds	Washington Redskins	LB
1998	7	39	228	Jim Turner	Carolina Panthers	WR
1999	1	2	2	Donovan McNabb	Philadelphia Eagles	QB
1999	2	1	32	Kevin Johnson	Cleveland Browns	WR
1999	2	12	43	Rob Konrad	Miami Dolphins	RB
2000	1	30	30	Keith Bulluck	Tennessee Titans	LB
2000	7	41	247	Mark Baniewicz	Jacksonville Jaguars	T
2001	1	22	22	Will Allen	New York Giants	DB
2001	3	13	75	Eric Downing	Kansas City Chiefs	DT
2001	3	26	88	Morlon Greenwood	Miami Dolphins	LB
2001	6	12	175	Dadrian Brown	Carolina Panthers	RB
2002	1	11	11	Dwight Freeney	Baltimore Colts	DE
2002	5	10	145	Kyle Johnson	Carolina Panthers	RB
2003	5	30	165	Chris Davis	Seattle Seahawks	RB
2003	6	38	211	David Tyree	New York Giants	WR
2004	5	2	134	Johnnie Morant	Oakland Raiders	WR
2004	7	25	226	Christian Ferrara	San Francisco 49ers	DT
2004	7	30	231	Kevin Sampson	Kansas City Chiefs	T
2005	2	32	64	Adam Terry	Baltimore Ravens	T
2006	3	19	83	Anthony Smith	Pittsburgh Steelers	DB
2006	5	6	139	Quinn Ojinnaka	Atlanta Falcons	T
2006	7	5	213	James Wyche	Jacksonville Jaguars	DE
2006	7	11	219	Ryan LaCasse	Baltimore Ravens	LB
2007	4	7	106	Tanard Jackson	Tampa Bay Buccaneers	DB
2007	7	9	219	Kelvin Smith	Miami Dolphins	LB
2009	4	28	128	Tony Fiammetta	Carolina Panthers	RB
2009	7	30	239	Ryan Durand	Tennessee Titans	G
2010	4	3	101	Mike Williams	Tampa Bay Buccaneers	WR
2010	5	26	157	Arthur Jones	Baltimore Ravens	DT
2011	4	22	119	Delone Carter	Indianapolis Colts	RB
2011	5	26	157	Doug Hogue	Detroit Lions	LB
2012	1	21	21	Chandler Jones	New England Patriots	DE
2012	6	9	179	Andrew Tiller	New Orleans Saints	G
2013	1	19	19	Justin Pugh	New York Giants	T
2013	4	13	110	Ryan Nassib	New York Giants	QB
2013	4	14	111	Shamarko Thomas	Pittsburgh Steelers	DB
2014	3	10	74	Jay Bromley	New York Giants	DT
2014	5	28	168	Marquis Spruill	Atlanta Falcons	LB
2016	7	7	228	Riley Dixon	Denver Broncos	P
2018	7	17	235	Zaire Franklin	Indianapolis Colts	LB
2019	7	31	245	Chris Slayton	New York Giants	DT
2020	5	2	148	Alton Robinson	Seattle Seahawks	DE
2020	7	14	228	Sterling Hofrichter	Atlanta Falcons	P
2021	3	1	65	Andre Cisco	Jacksonville Jaguars	DB
2021	3	37	101	Ifeatu Melifonwu	Detroit Lions	DB
2023	2	7	38	Matthew Bergeron	Atlanta Falcons	T
2023	3	9	72	Garrett Williams	Arizona Cardinals	DB
2025	5	27	165	Oronde Gadsden II	Los Angeles Chargers	TE
2025	6	5	181	Kyle McCord	Philadelphia Eagles	QB
2025	7	20	236	LeQuint Allen	Jacksonville Jaguars	RB
2025	7	38	254	Fadil Diggs	New Orleans Saints	DE

== Notable undrafted players ==
Note: No drafts held before 1920

Debut year	Player name	Debut NFL/AFL team	Position	Notes
1965	Billy Hunter	Washington Redskins	B	—
1968	Ted Allen	Philadelphia Eagles	RB	—
1971	George Jakowenko	St. Louis Cardinals	K	—
1983	Nick Bruckner	New York Jets	WR	—
1986	Mike Siano	Cleveland Browns	WR	—
1989	Todd Philcox	Cincinnati Bengals	QB	—
1993	David Walker	Miami Dolphins	RB	—
1994	Dwayne Joseph	Chicago Bears	DB	—
1995	Kirby Dar Dar	Miami Dolphins	WR	—
1996	Olindo Mare	New York Giants	K	—
2001	Duke Pettijohn	Cincinnati Bengals	DL	—
2002	P. J. Alexander	New Orleans Saints	G	—
2002	Quentin Harris	Arizona Cardinals	CB	—
2002	James Mungro	Detroit Lions	RB	—
2006	Steve Gregory	San Diego Chargers	S	—
2006	Joe Kowalewski	New York Jets	FB	—
2008	Jameel McClain	Baltimore Ravens	LB	—
2008	Taj Smith	Green Bay Packers	WR	—
2009	Curtis Brinkley	San Diego Chargers	RB	—
2013	Alec Lemon	Houston Texans	WR	—
2014	Jerome Smith	Atlanta Falcons	RB	—
2018	Steve Ishmael	Indianapolis Colts	WR	—
2018	Parris Bennett	Green Bay Packers	LB	—
2019	Eric Dungey	New York Giants	QB	—
2020	Trishton Jackson	Los Angeles Rams	WR	—
2023	Andre Szmyt	Chicago Bears	K	—
2023	Sean Tucker	Tampa Bay Buccaneers	RB	—
2024	Isaiah Johnson	Miami Dolphins	CB	—
2025	Justin Barron	Dallas Cowboys	S	—
2025	Tom Callahan	Las Vegas Raiders	LS	—
2025	Alijah Clark	Dallas Cowboys	DB	—
2025	Clarence Lewis	Dallas Cowboys	DB	—
2025	Maximilian Mang	Indianapolis Colts	TE	—
2025	Jackson Meeks	Detroit Lions	WR	—
2025	Savion Washington	Los Angeles Chargers	OT	—
2025	Marlowe Wax	Los Angeles Chargers	LB	—
2026	Devin Grant	Los Angeles Chargers	S	—
2026	Kevin Jobity Jr.	Pittsburgh Steelers	DT	—
2026	Jack Stonehouse	Houston Texans	P	—
2026	Dan Villari	Los Angeles Rams	TE	—
2026	Da'Metrius Weatherspoon	Buffalo Bills	OT	—
2026	Dion Wilson Jr.	Baltimore Ravens	DT	—
