= 2003 Syracuse Orangemen football team =

American college football season

2003 Syracuse Orangemen football
- Conference: Big East Conference
- Record: 6–6 (2–5 Big East)
- Head coach: Paul Pasqualoni (13th season)
- Offensive coordinator: George DeLeone (15th season)
- Defensive coordinator: Chris Rippon (5th season)
- Captains: R. J. Anderson; Keith Belton; Rich Scanlon
- Home stadium: Carrier Dome

2003 Big East Conference football standings
	Conf.			Overall
Team	W		L	W		L
No. 5 Miami (FL) $+	6	–	1	11	–	2
West Virginia +	6	–	1	8	–	5
Pittsburgh	5	–	2	8	–	5
Virginia Tech	4	–	3	8	–	5
Boston College	3	–	4	8	–	5
Syracuse	2	–	5	6	–	6
Rutgers	2	–	5	5	–	7
Temple	0	–	7	1	–	11
$ – BCS representative as conference champion; + – Conference co-champions; Rankings from AP Poll

The 2003 Syracuse Orangemen football team represented Syracuse University as a member of the Big East Conference during the 2003 NCAA Division I-A football season. Led by 13th-year head coach Paul Pasqualoni, the Orangemen compiled an overall record of 6–6 with a mark of 2–5 in conference play, tying for sixth place in the Big East. The team played home games at the Carrier Dome in Syracuse, New York.

This was the last season in which Syracuse used the "Orangemen" nickname. Beginning with the 2004–05 school year, the school adopted its current nickname of Orange.

== Schedule ==
Date	Time	Opponent	Site	TV	Result	Attendance
September 6	1:30 pm	at North Carolina*	Kenan Memorial Stadium; Chapel Hill, NC		W 49–47 ^{3OT}	47,000
September 13	1:30 pm	Louisville*	Carrier Dome; Syracuse, NY		L 20–30	38,550
September 20	12:00 pm	UCF*	Carrier Dome; Syracuse, NY	ESPN Plus	W 38–14	35,103
September 27	6:30 pm	Toledo*	Carrier Dome; Syracuse, NY		W 34–7	36,083
October 11	12:00 pm	at No. 4 Virginia Tech	Lane Stadium; Blacksburg, VA	ESPN	L 7–51	65,115
October 18	12:00 pm	Boston College	Carrier Dome; Syracuse, NY	ESPN Plus	W 39–14	45,313
October 25	12:00 pm	at Pittsburgh	Heinz Field; Pittsburgh, PA (rivalry)	ESPN Plus	L 14–34	61,421
November 8	1:30 pm	Temple^{†}	Carrier Dome; Syracuse, NY		W 41–17	43,149
November 15	12:00 pm	at No. 14 Miami (FL)	Miami Orange Bowl; Miami, FL	ESPN Plus	L 10–17	48,130
November 22	12:00 pm	No. 25 West Virginia	Carrier Dome; Syracuse, NY (rivalry)	ESPN2	L 23–34	41,801
November 29	12:00 pm	at Rutgers	Rutgers Stadium; Piscataway, NJ		L 7–24	18,563
December 6	1:00 pm	Notre Dame*	Carrier Dome; Syracuse, NY	ABC	W 38–12	48,170
*Non-conference game; ^{†}Homecoming; Rankings from AP Poll released prior to the game

== Roster ==
2003 Syracuse Orangemen football team roster
Players
Coaches
Offense

Pos.	#	Name	Class
RB	1	Damien Rhodes	So
WR	2	Johnnie Morant	Sr
RB	3	Tim Washington	Fr
QB	5	R. J. Anderson	Sr
WR	9	Kyle Bell	Fr
QB	10	Perry Patterson	Fr
QB	11	Matt Hale	Fr
WR	11	Jamiel Seebadri	Fr
WR	12	Jared Jones	Jr
FB	22	Sean Flannery	Fr
RB	23	Alexander Ridore	Jr
RB	24	Hymnson Chan	Fr
RB	24	Jeremy Sellers	Fr
WR	32	Todd Lisi	Jr
FB	38	Breyone Evans	Fr
RB	39	Walter Reyes	Jr
TE	40	Joe Donnelly	Sr
TE	41	Lenny Cusumano	Sr
OT	78	Adam Terry	Jr
OT	79	Eugene Newsome	Fr
WR	80	Andre Fontenette	Jr
WR	81	Timothy Lane	Fr
WR	83	Stan Bush	Fr
TE	84	Brandon Darlington	Fr
TE	85	Joe Kowalewski	So

Defense

Pos.	#	Name	Class
CB	13	Marcus Clayton	Fr
DB	19	Jonathan Plato	So
FS	20	Anthony Smith	So
FS	21	O'Neil Scott	Jr
SS	22	Diamond Ferri	Jr
CB	25	Steve Gregory	So
LB	55	Adam Namoury	Fr
DE	56	Julian Pollard	Jr
LB	57	Rich Scanlon	Sr
LB	58	Jesse Pellegrino	Fr
LB	92	Tommy Harris	So
DT	93	Christian Ferrara	Sr
DE	94	Ryan LaCasse	So
DT	96	Brian Hooper	Jr
DT	96	Justin Opalenski	Fr
DE	97	Josh Thomas	Sr
DL	98	Lee Williams	Fr
DT	99	Louis Gachelin	Sr

Special teams

Pos.	#	Name	Class

Head coach

- Paul Pasqualoni

Coordinators/assistant coaches

- Jerry Azzinaro (defensive line / recruiting coordinator)

Legend

- (C) Team captain
- (S) Suspended
- (I) Ineligible
- Injured
- Redshirt

Roster
