= 2012 Pinstripe Bowl =

2012 New Era Pinstripe Bowl
West Virginia Mountaineers	Syracuse Orange
(7–5)	(7–5)
Big 12	Big East
14	38
Head coach: Dana Holgorsen	Head coach: Doug Marrone
	1	2	3	4	Total
West Virginia	0	7	7	0	14
Syracuse	3	9	23	3	38
- Date: December 29, 2012
- Season: 2012
- Stadium: Yankee Stadium
- Location: Bronx, New York
- MVP: Prince-Tyson Gulley
- Favorite: Off
- Referee: Jay Stricherz (Pac-12)
- Attendance: 39,098

United States TV coverage
- Network: ESPN
- Announcers: Chris Fowler (play-by-play); Jesse Palmer (analyst); Tom Rinaldi (sidelines)

The 2012 New Era Pinstripe Bowl was a post-season American college football bowl game held on December 29, 2012 at Yankee Stadium in the New York City borough of The Bronx in the United States. The third edition of the Pinstripe Bowl began at 3:15 p.m. EST and aired on ESPN. It featured the West Virginia Mountaineers from the Big 12 Conference against the Big East Conference co-champion Syracuse Orange and was the final game of the 2012 NCAA Division I FBS football season for both teams. Both the Orange and the Mountaineers advanced to the game after accomplishing 7–5 records in the regular season.

The Mountaineers and the Orange had a notable continuous rivalry from 1955 until 2011. This included the years in the Big East Conference, which was established in 1979. The winner of the game was awarded the Ben Schwartzwalder Trophy from its establishment in 1993. That trophy was not on the line in the Pinstripe Bowl.

== Teams ==
This was the sixtieth meeting between these two teams. Syracuse leads the all-time record 33–27. The last time they played was in 2011.

=== West Virginia ===
The Mountaineers' first season as a member of the Big 12 started out smoothly, cruising to a 5–0 start and a #4 ranking. However, the Mountaineers would later receive a serious reality check in the form of a five-game losing streak. However, after winning their final two games of the season over the Iowa State Cyclones and Kansas Jayhawks, the Mountaineers would rebound to a 4–5 conference record.

=== Syracuse ===
With a 5–2 conference record the Orange became one of four Big East co-champions along with the Louisville Cardinals, Rutgers Scarlet Knights, and Cincinnati Bearcats.

This was the Orange's second Pinstripe Bowl; in the inaugural 2010 game they had defeated the Kansas State Wildcats by a score of 36–34 after a controversial excessive celebration call led to the Wildcats missing what would have been the game-tying two-point conversion. It was also the Orange's final game as a member of the Big East before they joined the Atlantic Coast Conference in 2013. This was the Mountaineers' first appearance in the Pinstripe Bowl.

== Game summary ==
=== Box score ===
Quarter	1	2	3	4	Total
West Virginia	0	7	7	0	14
Syracuse	3	9	23	3	38

at Yankee Stadium, Bronx, New York

- Date: December 29, 2012
- Game time: 3:15 p.m. EST
- Game weather: Snow
- Recap

Scoring summary

Quarter	Time	Drive			Team	Scoring information	Score	
Quarter	Time	Plays	Yards	TOP	Team	Scoring information	WVU	SYR
1	5:21	14	72	5:08	SYR	25-yard field goal by Ross Krautman	0	3
2	7:59	-	-	-	SYR	Geno Smith sacked by Cameron Lynch in end zone for a safety	0	5
2	6:07	6	65	1:52	SYR	Prince-Tyson Gulley 33-yard touchdown run, Ross Krautman kick good	0	12
2	3:38	6	69	2:29	WVU	Stedman Bailey 32-yard touchdown reception from Geno Smith, Tyler Bitancurt kick good	7	12
3	10:43	10	80	4:17	SYR	Beckett Wales 10-yard touchdown reception from Ryan Nassib, Ross Krautman kick good	7	19
3	6:52	1	67	0:13	SYR	Prince-Tyson Gulley 67-yard touchdown run, Ross Krautman kick good	7	26
3	5:41	4	63	1:11	WVU	Stedman Bailey 29-yard touchdown reception from Geno Smith, Tyler Bitancurt kick good	14	26
3	2:52	9	70	2:49	SYR	Prince-Tyson Gulley 9-yard touchdown reception from Ryan Nassib, Ross Krautman kick good	14	33
3	1:08	-	-	-	SYR	Geno Smith penalized for intentional grounding in end zone for a safety	14	35
4	11:57	10	32	4:11	SYR	36-yard field goal by Ross Krautman	14	38
"TOP" = time of possession. For other American football terms, see Glossary of American football.							14	38

=== Statistics ===
Statistics	WVU	SYR
First downs	15	28
Total yards	304	507
Rushes-Yards	30–103	65–369
Passing yards (net)	201	138
Cmp-Att-TD-INT	19–28–2–0	12–24–2–1
Penalties-Yards	11–116	5–57
Time of Possession	23:37	35:48

=== Notes ===
- Syracuse converted the first safety in Pinstripe Bowl history.
- Syracuse and West Virginia had previously met annually since 1955 when West Virginia was a member of the Big East. The two teams played for the Ben Schwartzwalder Trophy. The victory gave Syracuse an all-time series lead of 33–27.
- Game was played in heavy snowfall.

== See also ==
- Syracuse–West Virginia football rivalry
