= Amba Etta-Tawo =

American football player (born 1993)

No. 6, 7
- Position: Wide receiver

Personal information
- Born: November 10, 1993 (age 33); Muscat, Oman
- Listed height: 6 ft 1 in (1.85 m)
- Listed weight: 194 lb (88 kg)

Career information
- High school: McEachern (Powder Springs, Georgia, U.S.)
- College: Syracuse; Maryland
- NFL draft: 2017: undrafted

Career history
- Jacksonville Jaguars (2017)*; Kansas City Chiefs (2017)*; New York Giants (2017–2018)*; Birmingham Iron (2018)*; Houston Texans (2018)*; Birmingham Iron (2019); New York Giants (2019); Ottawa Redblacks (2021)*
- * Offseason or practice squad member only

Awards and highlights
- First-team All-ACC (2016)
- Stats at Pro Football Reference

Amba Etta-Tawo (born November 10, 1993) is a former American football wide receiver. He played college football at Maryland from 2012 to 2015 and at Syracuse in 2016.

== College career ==
=== Maryland ===
Etta-Tawo began attending Maryland in 2012 and redshirted his first season. On August 31, 2013, Etta-Tawo made his collegiate debut and caught first career touchdown reception in a 43–10 victory over FIU. On October 13, 2013, Etta-Tawo caught a season-high six passes for a career-high 109 receiving yards during a 34–10 loss to Wake Forest. On November 23, 2013, he made four receptions for 57-yards and a touchdown during a 29–26 loss to Boston College. The following week, Etta-Tawo caught four passes for 106 receiving yards in a 41–21 victory over NC State. He played in 12 games with seven starts with 32 receptions for 500-yards and two touchdowns.

Etta-Tawo returned in 2014 and played in 13 games, while starting the last six. On October 18, 2014, he caught a season-high three passes for 46-yards during a 38–31 victory to Iowa. On November 29, 2018, Etta-Tawo caught a career-long 71-yard touchdown pass in Maryland's 41–38 loss to Rutgers. He finished the season with ten receptions for 220 receiving yards and one touchdown.

He started the first two games of the 2015 season before being used as a reserve for the remainder of the season. On September 12, 2015, Etta-Tawo caught a season-high five receptions for 49-yards during a 48–27 loss to Bowling Green. On November 14, 2015, Etta-Tawo tied his season-high of five receptions and also had a season-high of 63 receiving yards in a 24–7 loss to Michigan State. Etta-Tawo completed the season with 20 receptions for 216 receiving yards and zero touchdowns in 12 games and two starts. Head coach Randy Edsall was fired after Maryland started the season 2–4 and was replaced by D. J. Durkin when he announced his arrival with Maryland.

On March 1, 2016, Etta-Tawo announced via Twitter his intention to transfer schools for the upcoming 2016 season after graduating in May.

=== Syracuse ===
On March 23, 2016, Etta-Tawo announced via Facebook that he had officially transferred to Syracuse as a graduate transfer. He opted to transfer after having his playing time decreased and falling on Maryland's depth chart.

On September 2, 2016, Etta-Tawo made his official Syracuse Orange debut, catching a 12 passes for 210 receiving yards and a touchdown during a 33–7 routing over FCS's Colgate. On September 24, 2016, he made 12 receptions for a career-high 270 receiving yards and two touchdown receptions in Syracuse's 31–24 win over UConn. On November 26, 2016, Etta-Tawo had a career-high 13 receptions for 178 receiving yards and a career-high five touchdown receptions during a 76–61 loss to Pittsburgh. He finished his only season under Syracuse head coach Dino Babers with 94 receptions for 1,482 receiving yards and 14 receiving touchdowns in 12 games and 12 starts.

He led all ACC receivers with seven games with over 100+ receiving yards and set a Syracuse school record. His 14 receiving touchdowns tied Tommy Kane's school record set in 1987. His 1,482 receiving yards ranked eighth in the FBS and second in any power five conference behind only Oklahoma's Dede Westbrook (1,524). He was voted team captain at the end of the season and finished being ranked as the 15th best college player and second best wide receiver in the nation by ESPN.

== Professional career ==
=== Pre-draft ===
On November 8, 2016, it was announced that Etta-Tawo had received an invitation to appear in the 2017 Senior Bowl. Etta-Tawo impressed scouts and teams during Senior Bowl practices and met with multiple team representatives, including Minnesota Vikings' head coach Mike Zimmer. Unfortunately, Etta-Tawo was unable to play in the Reese's Senior Bowl after dislocating a finger in practice. He was one of 57 collegiate wide receivers to attend the NFL Scouting Combine in Indianapolis, Indiana. He completed all of the combine drills and finished 17th among his position group at the 40-yard dash. On March 20, 2017, he attended Syracuse's pro day, along with 11 other prospects. Scouts and team representatives from 16 NFL and two CFL teams attended to scout Etta-Tawo as Syracuse's top prospect at the event. He weighed in five pounds lighter and ran the majority of combine drills again. He was clocked by officials running a 4.35s in the 40-yard dash that would've ranked third among wide receivers at the combine, behind only Washington's John Ross (4.22s) and Ohio State's Curtis Samuel (4.33s). He also ran positional and receiving drills, running NFL routes and catching passes from former Syracuse quarterback Terrel Hunt. At the conclusion of the pre-draft process, he was projected as a fifth to seventh round pick by NFL draft experts and scouts. He was ranked the 26th best wide receiver by CBS Sports and the 31st best wide receiver prospect by NFLDraftScout.com.

Pre-draft measurables
Height	Weight	Arm length	Hand span	40-yard dash	10-yard split	20-yard split	20-yard shuttle	Three-cone drill	Vertical jump	Broad jump	Bench press
6 ft 1 in (1.85 m)	208 lb (94 kg)	32 in (0.81 m)	9 1/8 in (0.23 m)	4.49 s	1.58 s	2.62 s	4.32 s	6.95 s	31 in (0.79 m)	10 ft 5 in (3.18 m)	14 reps
All values from NFL Combine

=== Jacksonville Jaguars ===
On April 30, 2017, the Jacksonville Jaguars signed Etta-Tawo to a three-year, $1.66 million contract as an undrafted free agent after he went unselected in the 2017 NFL draft. Multiple NFL teams contacted him immediately after the drafted concluded, but Etta-Tawo stated he ultimately chose the Jaguars due to their wide receivers coach Keenan McCardell, who he previously had played under at Maryland. On September 3, 2017, the Jacksonville Jaguars signed Etta-Tawo to their practice squad.

Throughout training camp, Etta-Tawo competed for a roster spot against Dede Westbrook, Arrelious Benn, Larry Pinkard, Jamal Robinson, Shane Wynn, Keelan Cole, and Kenneth Walker III. On September 19, 2017, the Jaguars released Etta-Tawo from their practice squad.

=== Kansas City Chiefs ===
On October 11, 2017, the Kansas City Chiefs signed Etta-Tawo to their practice squad. On November 16, 2017, he was released by the Chiefs.

=== New York Giants (first stint) ===
On December 20, 2017, the New York Giants signed Etta-Tawo to their practice squad. He signed a reserve/future contract with the Giants on January 1, 2018.

On September 1, 2018, Etta-Tawo was waived by the Giants. He was re-signed to the practice squad on September 26, 2018. He was released on October 4, 2018.

=== Birmingham Iron (first stint) ===
On November 9, 2018, Etta-Tawo signed with the Birmingham Iron of the Alliance of American Football.

=== Houston Texans ===
On December 12, 2018, the Houston Texans signed Etta-Tawo to their practice squad.

=== Birmingham Iron (second stint) ===
After his practice squad contract expired with the Texans at the end of the 2018 NFL season, he was signed to the Iron's active roster on January 15, 2019.

=== New York Giants (second stint) ===
On July 27, 2019, Etta-Tawo re-signed with the Giants due to injuries to Sterling Shepard, Darius Slayton, and Corey Coleman plus Golden Tate facing a suspension. He suffered a torn Achilles in practice and was ruled out for the season.

=== Ottawa Redblacks ===
Etta-Tawo signed with the Ottawa Redblacks of the CFL on December 14, 2020. He was placed on the suspended list on July 12, 2021. He was released on February 15, 2022.
