= 2016 Syracuse Orange football team =

American college football season

2016 Syracuse Orange football
- Conference: Atlantic Coast Conference
- Atlantic Division
- Record: 4–8 (2–6 ACC)
- Head coach: Dino Babers (1st season)
- Co-offensive coordinators: Sean Lewis (1st season); Mike Lynch (1st season)
- Offensive scheme: Veer and shoot
- Defensive coordinator: Brian Ward (1st season)
- Base defense: Multiple
- Home stadium: Carrier Dome

2016 Atlantic Coast Conference football standings
	Conf.			Overall
Team	W		L	W		L
Atlantic Division
No. 1 Clemson xy$#	7	–	1	14	–	1
No. 21 Louisville x	7	–	1	9	–	4
No. 8 Florida State	5	–	3	10	–	3
NC State	3	–	5	7	–	6
Wake Forest	3	–	5	7	–	6
Boston College	2	–	6	7	–	6
Syracuse	2	–	6	4	–	8
Coastal Division
No. 16 Virginia Tech xy	6	–	2	10	–	4
North Carolina	5	–	3	8	–	5
No. 20 Miami (FL)	5	–	3	9	–	4
Pittsburgh	5	–	3	8	–	5
Georgia Tech	4	–	4	9	–	4
Duke	1	–	7	4	–	8
Virginia	1	–	7	2	–	10
Championship: Clemson 42, Virginia Tech 35
# – College Football Playoff champion; $ – Conference champion; x – Division champion/co-champions; y – Championship game participant; Rankings from AP Poll

The 2016 Syracuse Orange football team represented Syracuse University in the 2016 NCAA Division I FBS football season. The Orange were led by first year head coach Dino Babers and played their home games at the Carrier Dome. They were members of the Atlantic Division of the Atlantic Coast Conference. They finished the season 4–8, 2–6 in ACC play to finish in a tie for sixth place in the Atlantic Division.

== Schedule ==
Date	Time	Opponent	Site	TV	Result	Attendance
September 2	7:00 pm	No. 21 (FCS) Colgate*	Carrier Dome; Syracuse, NY (rivalry)	ACCN+	W 33–7	31,336
September 9	8:00 pm	No. 13 Louisville	Carrier Dome; Syracuse, NY	ESPN2	L 28–62	32,184
September 17	3:30 pm	South Florida*^{†}	Carrier Dome; Syracuse, NY	ACCN+	L 20–45	32,288
September 24	1:00 pm	at UConn*	Rentschler Field; East Hartford, CT (rivalry)	CBSSN	W 31–24	31,899
October 1	12:00 pm	vs. Notre Dame*	MetLife Stadium; East Rutherford, NJ	ESPN	L 33–50	62,794
October 8	7:00 pm	at Wake Forest	BB&T Field; Winston-Salem, NC	ACCRSN	L 9–28	25,162
October 15	3:45 pm	No. 17 Virginia Tech	Carrier Dome; Syracuse, NY	ESPNU	W 31–17	33,838
October 22	12:30 pm	at Boston College	Alumni Stadium; Chestnut Hill, MA	ACCN	W 28–20	34,647
November 5	3:30 pm	at No. 3 Clemson	Memorial Stadium; Clemson, SC	ABC/ESPN2	L 0–54	80,609
November 12	12:30 pm	NC State	Carrier Dome; Syracuse, NY	ACCN	L 20–35	34,842
November 19	3:30 pm	No. 17 Florida State	Carrier Dome; Syracuse, NY	ABC/ESPN2	L 14–45	32,340
November 26	12:30 pm	at Pittsburgh	Heinz Field; Pittsburgh, PA (rivalry)	ACCN/WTAE-TV (Note: Week13)	L 61–76	34,049
*Non-conference game; ^{†}Homecoming; Rankings from Coaches' Poll released prior to the game; All times are in Eastern time

Schedule source:

== Game summaries ==
=== No. 21 (FCS) Colgate ===
	1	2	3	4	Total
No. 21 (FCS) Raiders	7	0	0	0	7
Orange	7	13	6	7	33

Statistics	COLG	SYR
First downs	11	25
Total yards	143	554
Rushing yards	45	117
Passing yards	98	437
Turnovers	0	1
Time of possession	29:34	30:26

Team	Category	Player	Statistics
Colagte	Passing	Jake Melville	10/22, 82 yards, TD
Colagte	Rushing	James Holland	14 rushes, 45 yards
Colagte	Receiving	Owen Rockett	2 receptions, 35 yards, TD
Syracuse	Passing	Eric Dungey	34/40, 355 yards, 2 TD
Syracuse	Rushing	Moe Neal	9 rushes, 68 yards, TD
Syracuse	Receiving	Amba Etta-Tawo	12 receptions, 210 yards, TD

=== No. 13 Louisville ===
	1	2	3	4	Total
No. 13 Cardinals	28	7	7	20	62
Orange	7	14	7	0	28

Statistics	LOU	SYR
First downs	30	24
Total yards	845	414
Rushing yards	414	121
Passing yards	431	293
Turnovers	3	2
Time of possession	31:28	28:24

Team	Category	Player	Statistics
Louisville	Passing	Lamar Jackson	20/39, 411 yards, TD, INT
Louisville	Rushing	Lamar Jackson	21 rushes, 199 yards, 4 TD
Louisville	Receiving	Jamari Staples	5 receptions, 136 yards
Syracuse	Passing	Eric Dungey	25/51, 255 yards, 3 TD, INT
Syracuse	Rushing	Moe Neal	12 rushes, 40 yards
Syracuse	Receiving	Amba Etta-Tawo	8 receptions, 103 yards, 2 TD

=== South Florida ===
	1	2	3	4	Total
Bulls	0	28	7	10	45
Orange	17	0	3	0	20

Statistics	USF	SYR
First downs	20	30
Total yards	454	549
Rushing yards	234	199
Passing yards	220	350
Turnovers	0	3
Time of possession	22:12	37:48

Team	Category	Player	Statistics
South Florida	Passing	Quinton Flowers	12/24, 188 yards, TD
South Florida	Rushing	Marlon Mack	9 rushes, 115 yards, 2 TD
South Florida	Receiving	Rodney Adams	4 receptions, 67 yards, TD
Syracuse	Passing	Eric Dungey	32/48, 350 yards, 2 TD, 2 INT
Syracuse	Rushing	Dontae Strickland	30 rushes, 127 yards
Syracuse	Receiving	Amba Etta-Tawo	8 receptions, 123 yards

=== At UConn ===
	1	2	3	4	Total
Orange	14	3	7	7	31
Huskies	0	14	3	7	24

Statistics	SYR	CONN
First downs	19	23
Total yards	469	425
Rushing yards	62	144
Passing yards	407	281
Turnovers	0	1
Time of possession	21:31	38:29

Team	Category	Player	Statistics
Syracuse	Passing	Eric Dungey	26/40, 407 yards, 2 TD
Syracuse	Rushing	Dontae Strickland	14 rushes, 51 yards
Syracuse	Receiving	Amba Etta-Tawo	12 receptions, 270 yards, 2 TD
UConn	Passing	Bryant Shirreffs	27/45, 264 yards, TD, INT
UConn	Rushing	Arkeel Newsome	15 rushes, 81 yards, TD
UConn	Receiving	Noel Thomas Jr.	14 receptions, 111 yards

=== Vs. Notre Dame ===
Notre Dame Fighting Irish vs. Syracuse Orange

Quarter	1	2	3	4	Total
Notre Dame	23	10	14	3	50
Syracuse	13	14	0	6	33

at MetLife Stadium, East Rutherford, New Jersey

- Date: October 1, 2016
- Game time: 12:00 p.m. EST
- Game weather: Cloudy, 60 °F (16 °C)
- Game attendance: 62,794
- Referee: Stuart Mullins
- TV announcers (ESPN): Bob Wischusen, Brock Huard, and Allison Williams
- Box Score

Game information

First quarter

- ND – Equanimeous St. Brown 79-yard pass from DeShone Kizer (Justin Yoon kick), 14:42. Notre Dame 7–0. Drive: 1 play, 79 yards, 0:18.
- SU – Eric Dungey 3-yard run (kick blocked), 12:36. Notre Dame 7–6. Drive: 8 plays, 75 yards, 2:06.
- ND – Cole Luke PAT return, 12:36. Notre Dame 9–6.
- ND – Equanimeous St. Brown 67-yard pass from DeShone Kizer (Justin Yoo kick), 11:23. Notre Dame 16–6. Drive: 3 plays, 74 yards, 1:14.
- SU – Amba Etta-Tawo 72-yard pass from Eric Dungey (Cole Murphy kick), 10:17. Notre Dame 16–13. Drive: 3 plays, 79 yards, 1:06.
- ND – C. J. Sanders 93-yard kickoff return (Justin Yoon kick), 10:06. Notre Dame 23–13.

Second quarter

- SU – Eric Dungey 1-yard run (Cole Murphy kick), 13:22. Notre Dame 23–20. Drive: 9 plays, 78 yards, 3:06.
- ND – DeShone Kizer 3-yard run (Justin Yoon kick), 12:11. Notre Dame 30–20. Drive: 5 plays, 71 yards, 1:11.
- ND – Justin Yoon 31-yard field goal, 5:03. Notre Dame 33–20. Drive: 7 plays, 37 yards, 3:11.
- SU – Ervin Phillips 14-yard pass from Eric Dungey (Cole Murphy kick), 0:30. Notre Dame 33–27. Drive: 2 plays, 14 yards, 0:08.

Third quarter

- ND – Kevin Stepherson 54-yard pass from DeShone Kizer (Justin Yoon kick), 11:23. Notre Dame 40–27. Drive: 4 plays, 86 yards, 1:41.
- ND – Dexter Williams 59-yard run (Justin Yoon kick), 8:26. Notre Dame 47–27. Drive: 3 plays, 70 yards, 1:22.

Fourth quarter

- ND – Justin Yoon 39-yard field goal, 11:14. Notre Dame 50–27. Drive: 11 plays, 72 yards, 3:58.
- SU – Eric Dungey 5-yard run (run failed), 6:52. Notre Dame 50—33. Drive: 14 plays, 75 yards, 4:22.

Top passers

- ND – DeShone Kizer – 23/35, 471 yards, 3 TD, INT
- SU – Eric Dungey – 31/51, 363 yards, 2 TD

Top rushers

- ND – Josh Adams – 20 rushes, 102 yards
- SU – Eric Dungey – 17 rushes, 49 yards, 3 TD

Top receivers

- ND – Equanimeous St. Brown – 4 receptions, 182 yards, 2 TD
- SU – Amba Etta-Tawo – 7 receptions, 134 yards, TD

=== At Wake Forest ===
	1	2	3	4	Total
Orange	2	7	0	0	9
Demon Deacons	0	14	0	14	28

Statistics	SYR	WF
First downs	14	21
Total yards	326	330
Rushing yards	158	190
Passing yards	168	140
Turnovers	2	2
Time of possession	25:56	34:04

Team	Category	Player	Statistics
Syracuse	Passing	Eric Dungey	16/25, 156 yards, INT
Syracuse	Rushing	Dontae Strickland	13 rushes, 74 yards, TD
Syracuse	Receiving	Steve Ishmael	5 receptions, 56 yards
Wake Forest	Passing	John Wolford	13/22, 140 yards, INT
Wake Forest	Rushing	Cade Carney	29 rushes, 104 yards, TD
Wake Forest	Receiving	Cam Serigne	4 receptions, 68 yards

=== No. 17 Virginia Tech ===
	1	2	3	4	Total
No. 17 Hokies	3	0	6	8	17
Orange	7	10	0	14	31

Statistics	VT	SYR
First downs	21	32
Total yards	468	561
Rushing yards	161	156
Passing yards	307	405
Turnovers	2	1
Time of possession	26:35	33:25

Team	Category	Player	Statistics
Virginia Tech	Passing	Jerod Evans	20/33, 307 yards, 2 TD, INT
Virginia Tech	Rushing	Jerod Evans	11 rushes, 61 yards
Virginia Tech	Receiving	Isaiah Ford	8 receptions, 83 yards, TD
Syracuse	Passing	Eric Dungey	28/53, 311 yards, TD, INT
Syracuse	Rushing	Eric Dungey	24 rushes, 106 yards, TD
Syracuse	Receiving	Ervin Philips	11 receptions, 139 yards, TD

=== At Boston College ===
	1	2	3	4	Total
Orange	7	7	7	7	28
Eagles	3	7	7	3	20

Statistics	SYR	BC
First downs	23	16
Total yards	532	287
Rushing yards	98	223
Passing yards	434	64
Turnovers	3	2
Time of possession	30:51	29:09

Team	Category	Player	Statistics
Syracuse	Passing	Eric Dungey	32/38, 434 yards, 3 TD, INT
Syracuse	Rushing	Eric Dungey	17 rushes, 54 yards
Syracuse	Receiving	Amba Etta-Tawo	10 receptions, 144 yards, TD
Boston College	Passing	Patrick Towles	4/14, 45 yards, INT
Boston College	Rushing	Patrick Towles	10 rushes, 104 yards, TD
Boston College	Receiving	Michael Walker	3 receptions, 40 yards

=== At No. 3 Clemson ===
	1	2	3	4	Total
Orange	0	0	0	0	0
No. 3 Tigers	10	20	14	10	54

Statistics	SYR	CLEM
First downs	15	28
Total yards	277	565
Rushing yards	105	195
Passing yards	172	370
Turnovers	3	0
Time of possession	27:33	32:27

Team	Category	Player	Statistics
Syracuse	Passing	Austin Wilson	17/27, 116 yards, 2 INT
Syracuse	Rushing	Moe Neal	7 rushes, 64 yards
Syracuse	Receiving	Amba Etta-Tawo	9 receptions, 84 yards
Clemson	Passing	Nick Shuessler	11/17, 177 yards, 2 TD
Clemson	Rushing	Wayne Gallman	10 rushes, 63 yards, TD
Clemson	Receiving	Deon Cain	5 receptions, 125 yards, 2 TD

=== NC State ===
	1	2	3	4	Total
Wolfpack	0	14	14	7	35
Orange	7	3	10	0	20

Statistics	NCST	SYR
First downs	27	10
Total yards	544	218
Rushing yards	184	28
Passing yards	360	190
Turnovers	2	2
Time of possession	41:18	18:42

Team	Category	Player	Statistics
NC State	Passing	Ryan Finley	20/29, 340 yards, TD
NC State	Rushing	Matt Dayes	27 rushes, 108 yards, 3 TD
NC State	Receiving	Kelvin Harmon	4 receptions, 101 yards, TD
Syracuse	Passing	Zack Mahoney	14/25, 190 yards, TD, INT
Syracuse	Rushing	Dontae Strickland	12 rushes, 28 yards, TD
Syracuse	Receiving	Amba Etta-Tawo	4 receptions, 88 yards, TD

=== No. 17 Florida State ===
	1	2	3	4	Total
No. 17 Seminoles	14	7	21	3	45
Orange	0	7	7	0	14

Statistics	FSU	SYR
First downs	34	13
Total yards	654	233
Rushing yards	334	37
Passing yards	320	196
Turnovers	4	2
Time of possession	34:43	25:17

Team	Category	Player	Statistics
Florida State	Passing	Deondre Francois	18/28, 315 yards, 2 TD, INT
Florida State	Rushing	Dalvin Cook	28 rushes, 225 yards, 4 TD
Florida State	Receiving	Auden Tate	5 receptions, 77 yards
Syracuse	Passing	Zack Mahoney	16/36, 196 yards, 2 TD, 2 INT
Syracuse	Rushing	Dontae Strickland	10 rushes, 19 yards
Syracuse	Receiving	Ervin Philips	7 receptions, 63 yards, TD

=== At Pittsburgh ===
	1	2	3	4	Total
Orange	14	7	13	27	61
Panthers	14	21	21	20	76

Statistics	SYR	PITT
First downs	38	20
Total yards	668	644
Rushing yards	228	393
Passing yards	440	251
Turnovers	1	2
Time of possession	35:42	24:18

Team	Category	Player	Statistics
Syracuse	Passing	Zack Mahoney	43/61, 440 yards, 5 TD, INT
Syracuse	Rushing	Moe Neal	8 rushes, 91 yards, TD
Syracuse	Receiving	Amba Etta-Tawo	13 receptions, 178 yards, 5 TD
Pittsburgh	Passing	Nathan Peterman	9/18, 251 yards, 4 TD, INT
Pittsburgh	Rushing	James Conner	19 rushes, 115 yards, 2 TD
Pittsburgh	Receiving	Jester Weah	4 receptions, 99 yards, 2 TD
