= Syracuse–West Virginia football rivalry =

American college football rivalry

- Syracuse Orange West Virginia Mountaineers
- First meeting: October 12, 1945; Syracuse, 12–0
- Latest meeting: December 28, 2018; Syracuse, 34–18
- Next meeting: TBD
- Trophy: Ben Schwartzwalder Trophy

Statistics
- Total meetings: 61
- All-time series: Syracuse leads, 34–27
- Largest victory: Syracuse, 45–0 (1960)
- Longest win streak: West Virginia, 8 (2002–2009)
- Current win streak: Syracuse, 4 (2010–present)

Locations of Syracuse and West Virginia

The Syracuse–West Virginia football rivalry is an American college football rivalry between the Syracuse Orange football team of Syracuse University and West Virginia Mountaineers football team of West Virginia University.

== History ==
The Ben Schwartzwalder Trophy is the trophy that went annually to the winner of the game. It was introduced in 1993 and is named after former WVU football player and Syracuse head coach Ben Schwartzwalder, who died in April of that year. It was sculpted by Syracuse player Jimmy Ridlon.

West Virginia won the first trophy game 43–0 at Syracuse and has gone on to win 11. Syracuse has won the trophy eight times and leads the series 34–27. With West Virginia's move to the Big 12 Conference in 2012 and Syracuse's move to the Atlantic Coast Conference in 2013, the future of the series is in doubt with no meetings currently planned.

The two teams met in the 2012 Pinstripe Bowl and 2018 Camping World Bowl, which Syracuse won 38–14 and 34–18 respectively. However, the trophy was not at stake.

== Game results ==
Syracuse victories	West Virginia victories

No.	Date	Location	Winner	Score
1	October 12, 1945	Syracuse, NY	Syracuse	12–0
2	October 26, 1946	Morgantown, WV	West Virginia	13–0
3	November 19, 1955	Morgantown, WV	Syracuse	20–13
4	October 13, 1956	Syracuse, NY	Syracuse	27–20
5	November 23, 1957	Morgantown, WV	West Virginia	7–0
6	November 22, 1958	Morgantown, WV	#10 Syracuse	15–12
7	October 24, 1959	Syracuse, NY	#6 Syracuse	44–0
8	October 22, 1960	Morgantown, WV	#3 Syracuse	45–0
9	September 30, 1961	Syracuse, NY	#5 Syracuse	29–14
10	November 24, 1962	Syracuse, NY	West Virginia	17–6
11	November 9, 1963	Syracuse, NY	Syracuse	15–13
12	November 21, 1964	Morgantown, WV	West Virginia	28–27
13	November 13, 1965	Morgantown, WV	Syracuse	41–19
14	November 19, 1966	Morgantown, WV	Syracuse	34–7
15	September 30, 1967	Syracuse, NY	Syracuse	23–6
16	November 23, 1968	Morgantown, WV	West Virginia	23–16
17	November 22, 1969	Syracuse, NY	#18 West Virginia	13–10
18	November 14, 1970	Morgantown, WV	West Virginia	28–19
19	November 20, 1971	Syracuse, NY	Syracuse	28–24
20	November 18, 1972	Morgantown, WV	West Virginia	43–12
21	November 24, 1973	Syracuse, NY	West Virginia	24–14
22	November 9, 1974	Morgantown, WV	West Virginia	39–11
23	November 22, 1975	Syracuse, NY	Syracuse	20–19
24	November 20, 1976	Morgantown, WV	West Virginia	34–28
25	November 19, 1977	Syracuse, NY	Syracuse	28–9
26	October 7, 1978	Morgantown, WV	Syracuse	31–15
27	September 15, 1979	East Rutherford, NJ	Syracuse	24–14
28	November 22, 1980	Morgantown, WV	Syracuse	20–7
29	November 21, 1981	Syracuse, NY	Syracuse	27–24
30	November 20, 1982	Morgantown, WV	#16 West Virginia	26–0
31	November 19, 1983	Syracuse, NY	Syracuse	27–16

No.	Date	Location	Winner	Score
32	October 13, 1984	Morgantown, WV	West Virginia	20–10
33	November 30, 1985	Syracuse, NY	West Virginia	13–10
34	November 22, 1986	Morgantown, WV	Syracuse	34–23
35	November 21, 1987	Syracuse, NY	#6 Syracuse	32–31
36	November 19, 1988	Morgantown, WV	#4 West Virginia	31–9
37	November 24, 1989	Syracuse, NY	#17 West Virginia	24–17
38	November 17, 1990	Morgantown, WV	Syracuse	31–7
39	November 23, 1991	Syracuse, NY	#16 Syracuse	16–10
40	October 17, 1992	Morgantown, WV	#14 Syracuse	20–17
41	October 30, 1993	Syracuse, NY	#13 West Virginia	43–0
42	November 24, 1994	Morgantown, WV	West Virginia	13–0
43	October 21, 1995	Syracuse, NY	Syracuse	22–0
44	November 2, 1996	Morgantown, WV	Syracuse	30–7
45	November 1, 1997	Syracuse, NY	Syracuse	40–10
46	November 7, 1998	Morgantown, WV	West Virginia	35–28
47	September 25, 1999	Syracuse, NY	Syracuse	30–7
48	November 4, 2000	Morgantown, WV	Syracuse	31–27
49	November 10, 2001	Syracuse, NY	#14 Syracuse	24–13
50	October 19, 2002	Morgantown, WV	West Virginia	34–7
51	November 22, 2003	Syracuse, NY	#25 West Virginia	34–23
52	October 21, 2004	Morgantown, WV	#15 West Virginia	27–6
53	September 4, 2005	Syracuse, NY	West Virginia	15–7
54	October 14, 2006	Morgantown, WV	#5 West Virginia	41–17
55	October 6, 2007	Syracuse, NY	#13 West Virginia	55–14
56	October 11, 2008	Morgantown, WV	West Virginia	17–6
57	October 10, 2009	Syracuse, NY	West Virginia	34–13
58	October 23, 2010	Morgantown, WV	Syracuse	19–14
59	October 21, 2011	Syracuse, NY	Syracuse	49–23
60	December 29, 2012	Bronx, NY	Syracuse	38–14
61	December 28, 2018	Orlando, FL	#20 Syracuse	34–18
Series: Syracuse leads 34–27

== See also ==
- List of NCAA college football rivalry games
