= Norm Michael =

American football player (1921–2011)

Profile
- Position: Fullback

Personal information
- Born: May 1, 1921; Rocky River, Ohio, U.S.
- Died: September 25, 2011 (aged 90); Rochester, New York, U.S.
- Listed height: 6 ft 2 in (1.88 m)
- Listed weight: 192 lb (87 kg)

Career information
- High school: Lakewood (Lakewood, Ohio)
- College: Syracuse University

Norman Gladding Michael (May 1, 1921 – September 25, 2011) was an American college football player who was a fullback and war veteran. He played college football for the Syracuse Orange before being drafted by the Philadelphia Eagles in the 20th round of the 1944 NFL draft. At the time of the draft, Michael was serving in World War II, and he did not learn of his selection until 55 years later.

== Early life and education ==
Born in Providence, RI in 1921, Michael attended high school at Lakewood. He played college football at Syracuse University, playing fullback. One of his best plays came as a sophomore, where he made a 58-yard run against rival Colgate, scoring a touchdown a few plays later. But on the next possession he broke his leg and was out for the year. He was frequently injured during his time at Syracuse, "keeping the doctors busy", according to the Democrat and Chronicle. In addition, Michael suffered a torn arm muscle as a freshman, and fracturing or breaking his wrist, arm, nose, and ankle in his final two seasons. While healthy, he was rated a top-class fullback, being dubbed by a scouting report as, "a first-class fullback so long as his bones maintain the particular spirit of unity." Another newspaper described him as "a Rocky River, Ohio boy who is touted as one of the fastest backs ever to play for Syracuse." Though he was mainly used as a blocker, he made the most of his rushes, averaging 10.5 yards per-carry in one season.

== NFL draft ==
Following his college career Michael was selected in the 20th round of the 1944 NFL draft by the Philadelphia Eagles. However, the Eagles were not able to locate him, as he was stationed at Maxwell Air Force Base in Alabama, serving in World War II.

== Later life ==
Afterwards he worked at multiple sales jobs near Syracuse and was a business owner in Rochester, retiring in 1978.

He did not learn of his selection in the NFL draft until 55 years later, in 1999, while reading a local newspaper listing Syracuse draftees. "That was the first I heard of it," Michael said. "I thought my eyes were playing tricks on me." "I guess I may have missed my window of opportunity," he said, laughing. "My son sent them a letter after we found out, I think he wanted to see if the Eagles owed me a signing bonus. Think of the interest I could have had. Fifty-seven years’ worth," he also said.

He died on September 25, 2011, at the age of 90.
