= Marvin Graves =

American football player (born 1971)

Profile
- Position: Quarterback

Personal information
- Born: February 7, 1971 (age 55); Washington, D.C., U.S.

Career information
- High school: Archbishop Carroll
- College: Syracuse

Career history
- 1994–1995: Toronto Argonauts
- 1996, 2000–2001: Saskatchewan Roughriders
- 1997: Montreal Alouettes

Marvin Graves (born February 7, 1971) is an American former professional football player who was a quarterback in the Canadian Football League (CFL). He played college football for the Syracuse Orange, becoming one of the top signal-callers in the program's history.

== Early life ==
Born in Washington, D.C., Graves was a standout quarterback at Archbishop Carroll High School, and also excelled at basketball and baseball for the D.C. high school.

== College career ==
Graves finished his career as the all-time passing yardage leader at Syracuse (8,466), leading the Orange in the category each of his four campaigns. His 48 touchdown tosses rank second in program history. Graves quarterbacked SU to victories in the 1990 Aloha bowl, the 1992 Hall of Fame bowl, where he was named MVP, and the 1993 Fiesta bowl, where he was named co-MVP with Kevin Mitchell. In a 1992 game vs. Rutgers, he gained 476 yards.

Graves was named to Syracuse University's All-Century team in November, 1999.

== Professional career ==
Graves was a quarterback for the Toronto Argonauts (1994–1995), the Saskatchewan Roughriders (1996, 2000–2001), and the Montreal Alouettes (1997).

== Coaching career ==
After his CFL career, Graves went on to coach for Washington, D.C. high schools as well as several quarterback camps. He coached quarterbacks for the Division III Catholic University of America.

== Ultimate Frisbee ownership ==
In 2013, Graves was the co-owner of the Washington, D.C. professional Ultimate team, the DC Breeze.
