= Rich Scanlon =

American football player (born 1980)

No. 91, 55, 57, 52
- Position: Linebacker

Personal information
- Born: December 23, 1980 (age 45); Oradell, New Jersey, U.S.
- Listed height: 6 ft 2 in (1.88 m)
- Listed weight: 250 lb (113 kg)

Career information
- High school: Bergen Catholic (Oradell)
- College: Syracuse
- NFL draft: 2004: undrafted

Career history
- Kansas City Chiefs (2004–2006); → Berlin Thunder (2005); Tennessee Titans (2007); New York Giants (2008)

Awards and highlights
- Second-team All-Big East (2003); NFL Europe Defensive MVP (2005)

Career NFL statistics
- Total tackles: 44
- Fumble recoveries: 2
- Stats at Pro Football Reference

Richard James Scanlon (born December 23, 1980) is an American former professional football player who was a linebacker in the National Football League (NFL). He played college football for the Syracuse Orange and was signed by the Kansas City Chiefs as an undrafted free agent in 2004.

Scanlon has also played for the Tennessee Titans and New York Giants.

== Early life ==
Scanlon grew up in Oradell, New Jersey, and was a standout player at Bergen Catholic High School, where he was named the New Jersey Defensive Player of the Year by The Star-Ledger (Newark, New Jersey) in 1998.

== College career ==
He appeared in 43 games (27 starts) for Syracuse University and recorded 277 tackles, 4 sacks, two interceptions, three fumble recoveries, two forced fumbles and eight passes defensed. Scanlon graduated with a degree in Exercise Science, with an eye toward attending medical school.

== Professional career ==
=== Kansas City Chiefs ===
Scanlon signed with the Kansas City Chiefs as an undrafted free agent in 2004, played with the Berlin Thunder in 2005 and remained with the Chiefs through the 2007 preseason, when he was released during final cuts.

=== Tennessee Titans ===
On October 31, 2007, he signed with the Tennessee Titans.

=== New York Giants ===
Scanlon was signed by the New York Giants on December 30, 2008, when Edmond Miles was released.
