= Sean Tucker (American football) =

American football player (born 2001)

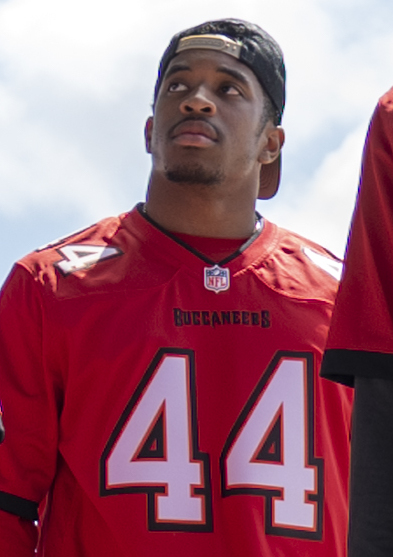
- Tucker with the Tampa Bay Buccaneers in 2023

No. 44 – Tampa Bay Buccaneers
- Positions: Running back, kickoff returner
- Roster status: Active

Personal information
- Born: October 25, 2001 (age 25); Owings Mills, Maryland, U.S.
- Listed height: 5 ft 10 in (1.78 m)
- Listed weight: 205 lb (93 kg)

Career information
- High school: Calvert Hall (Towson, Maryland)
- College: Syracuse (2020–2022)
- NFL draft: 2023: undrafted

Career history
- Tampa Bay Buccaneers (2023–present)

Awards and highlights
- First-team All-American (2021); First-team All-ACC (2021); Second-team All-ACC (2022)

Career NFL statistics as of Week 9, 2026
- Rushing yards: 731
- Rushing average: 4.4
- Rushing touchdowns: 11
- Receptions: 19
- Receiving yards: 152
- Receiving touchdowns: 2
- Return yards: 1,119
- Stats at Pro Football Reference

Sean Lance Tucker (born October 25, 2001) is an American professional football running back and kickoff returner for the Tampa Bay Buccaneers of the National Football League (NFL). He played college football for the Syracuse Orange and was signed as an undrafted free agent by the Buccaneers after the 2023 NFL draft.

== Early life ==
Tucker was born on October 25, 2001, in Owings Mills, Maryland. He attended Calvert Hall in Towson, Maryland, where he played football and also ran track. Considered one of the top running back prospects in Maryland by ESPN (#14), 247Sports (#27, rated three-star) and Rivals (#27), Tucker was recruited by Syracuse assistant coach Reno Ferri.

== College career ==
=== 2020 ===
As a freshman in 2020, Tucker was named Syracuse's starting running back four games into the season following a rash of injuries and opt-outs due to COVID-19 pandemic. He ran for the third-most yards (626 yards) and the second-most yards per game (69.9) in a single season by a Syracuse Orange freshman ever. He was named the Atlantic Coast Conference (ACC) Running Back of the Week twice and led all freshmen running backs in the ACC in rushing yards per game.

=== 2021 ===
During the breakout 2021 season, Tucker totaled 1,496 rushing yards during the 2021 regular season, fourth best among all Division I FBS players. He became the first player in program history to rush for over 1,000 yards in eight games or less and set the program record for most 100-yard games in a season (8) and most consecutive 100 yards games at 7. He broke Joe Morris's 42-year record for Syracuse's most single-season rushing yards in game against NC State. In addition to breaking this record set in 1979, Tucker also overtook Syracuse greats such as Floyd Little, Walter Reyes, and Larry Csonka. In the game against Albany, Tucker had a combined 253 yards (132 rushing, 121 receiving) and five touchdowns, becoming the first player in program history to have both 100+ rushing yards and 100+ receiving yards. Tucker surpassed 1,000-yard mark in win over Virginia Tech. Against Boston College, he amassed a career-high 207 rushing yards.

Tucker was named to the Associated Press midseason All-America first team. ESPN college football analyst Trevor Matich named Tucker one of four candidates for the Heisman Trophy. He was the semifinalists for the Doak Walker Award as well as the Maxwell Award. Tucker was named the ACC Running Back of the Week multiple times.

Tucker was named to first-team All-ACC, first-team All-American by Football Writers Association of America, ESPN and second-team All-American by the Associated Press, Walter Camp Football Foundation, and American Football Coaches Association.

=== Statistics ===
| Year | Team | Games | | Rushing | | | | Receiving | | | |
| Year | Team | GP | GS | Att | Yards | Avg | TD | Att | Yards | Avg | TD |
|---|---|---|---|---|---|---|---|---|---|---|---|
| 2020 | Syracuse | 9 | 5 | 137 | 626 | 4.8 | 4 | 8 | 113 | 14.1 | 0 |
| 2021 | Syracuse | 12 | 12 | 246 | 1,496 | 6.1 | 12 | 20 | 255 | 12.8 | 2 |
| 2022 | Syracuse | 12 | 12 | 206 | 1,060 | 5.1 | 11 | 36 | 254 | 7.1 | 2 |
| Career | | 33 | 29 | 589 | 3,182 | 5.4 | 27 | 64 | 622 | 9.7 | 4 |

== Professional career ==
Pre-draft measurables
| Height | Weight | Arm length | Hand span | Wingspan |
|---|---|---|---|---|
| 5 ft 9 1/4 in (1.76 m) | 207 lb (94 kg) | 30 in (0.76 m) | 9 1/2 in (0.24 m) | 6 ft 1 3/8 in (1.86 m) |
All values from the NFL Combine

=== 2023 season ===
After going undrafted in 2023 NFL draft, Tucker signed with the Tampa Bay Buccaneers as an undrafted free agent on April 29, 2023. On August 29, 2023, the Buccaneers announced that he had made the initial 53-man roster. In Week 1 of the 2023 season Tucker saw action against the Minnesota Vikings having 5 carries for 15 yards and 2 receptions for 9 yards. He had declining touches in Weeks 2 and 3 and none for the rest of the season. Tucker appeared in 11 games in his first season with the Bucs, primarily as a special teams player.

=== 2024 season ===
Tucker opened the 2024 season as the third-string running back behind Rachaad White and rookie Bucky Irving. He appeared in every game of the 2024 season.

In Week 6 of the 2024 season, Tucker rushed for 136 yards and a touchdown, plus three catches for 56 yards and a touchdown in a 51–27 win over the New Orleans Saints, earning NFC Offensive Player of the Week.

For the season, Tucker carried the ball 50 times for 308 yards and 2 touchdowns. He also caught the ball 9 times for 109 yards with 1 touchdown. Additionally, Tucker contributed on special teams as he returned 15 kickoffs for 410 yards.

=== 2025 season ===
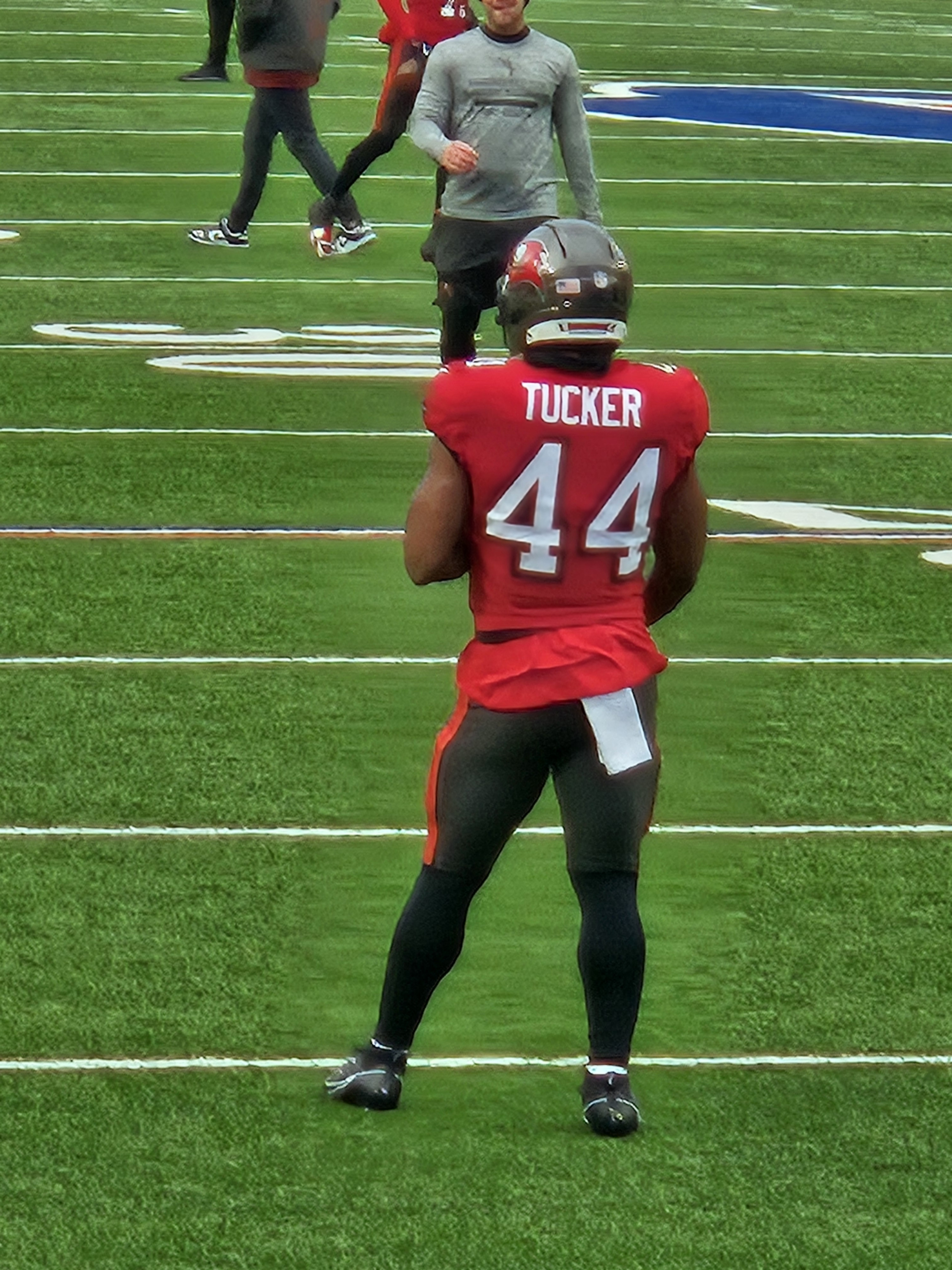
Tucker warming up against the Buffalo Bills in 2025

Tucker saw more playing time in 2025 as Irving suffered a dislocated shoulder that forced him to miss multiple weeks. Initially taking a change-of-pace role behind White, Tucker eventually out-rushed White. He had another strong game against the Buffalo Bills, rushing for 106 yards on 19 carries for two touchdowns, in addition to 34 receiving yards and a touchdown.

== NFL career statistics ==
Legend
| **Bold** | Career high |

| Year | Team | Games | | Rushing | | | | | Receiving | | | | | Kick returns | | | | | Fumbles | |
| Year | Team | GP | GS | Att | Yds | Avg | Lng | TD | Rec | Yds | Avg | Lng | TD | Ret | Yds | Avg | Lng | TD | Fum | Lost |
|---|---|---|---|---|---|---|---|---|---|---|---|---|---|---|---|---|---|---|---|---|
| 2023 | TB | 11 | 0 | 15 | 23 | 1.5 | 7 | 0 | 2 | 9 | 4.5 | 6 | 0 | — | — | — | — | — | 0 | 0 |
| 2024 | TB | 17 | 0 | 50 | 308 | **6.2** | 36 | 2 | **9** | **109** | **12.1** | **36** | **1** | 15 | 410 | **27.3** | **53** | 0 | 1 | 0 |
| 2025 | TB | 17 | 0 | **86** | **320** | 3.7 | **43** | **7** | 8 | 34 | 4.3 | 28 | **1** | **26** | **597** | 23.0 | 35 | 0 | **2** | 0 |
| Career | | 45 | 0 | 151 | 651 | 4.3 | 43 | 9 | 19 | 152 | 8.0 | 36 | 2 | 41 | 1,007 | 24.6 | 53 | 0 | 3 | 0 |
