= Dino Babers =

American football player and coach (born 1961)

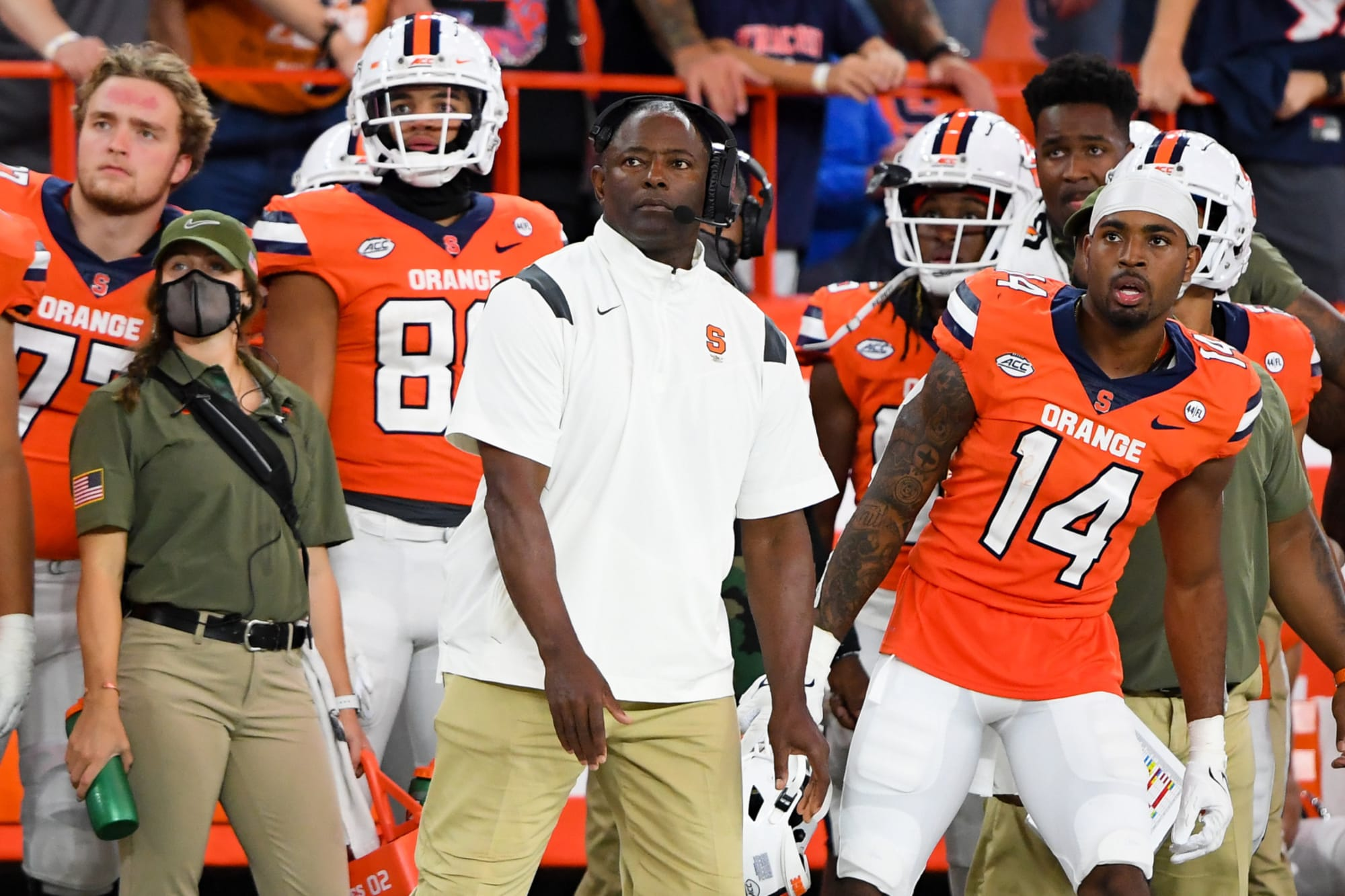
- Babers in 2022

Biographical details
- Born: July 19, 1961 (age 65); Honolulu, Hawaii, U.S.

Playing career
- 1979–1983: Hawaii
- Positions: Running back, defensive back

Coaching career (HC unless noted)
- 1984: Hawaii (GA)
- 1985: Arizona State (GA)
- 1987: Eastern Illinois (RB)
- 1988–1989: UNLV (ST/RB)
- 1990: Northern Arizona (ST/DB)
- 1991–1993: Purdue (WR)
- 1994: San Diego State (WR)
- 1995–1996: Arizona (WR)
- 1997: Arizona (RB)
- 1998–2000: Arizona (OC/QB)
- 2001–2002: Texas A&M (OC/QB)
- 2003: Pittsburgh (RB)
- 2004–2005: UCLA (WR)
- 2006: UCLA (RB)
- 2007: UCLA (AHC/RB)
- 2008: Baylor (WR/RC)
- 2009–2011: Baylor (ST/WR)
- 2012–2013: Eastern Illinois
- 2014–2015: Bowling Green
- 2016–2023: Syracuse
- 2024: Arizona (OC/QB)

Head coaching record
- Overall: 78–71
- Bowls: 2–1
- Tournaments: 1–2 (NCAA D-I playoffs)

Accomplishments and honors

Championships
- 2 OVC (2012–2013); 1 MAC (2015); 2 MAC East Division (2014–2015)

Awards
- 2× OVC Coach of the Year (2012–2013); AP ACC Coach of the Year (2018); ECAC Coach of the Year (2018)

Dino Sean Babers (born July 19, 1961) is an American college football coach. He was most recently the offensive coordinator for the University of Arizona. He was previously the head coach at Syracuse University from 2016 until 2023. He has also served as head coach at Bowling Green State University and Eastern Illinois University. Babers grew up in California and played football at the University of Hawaiʻi at Mānoa.

== Playing career ==
Babers was born in Honolulu, grew up in San Diego, and attended the University of Hawaii at Manoa (1979–1983) where he played running back and defensive back on the football team.

== Coaching career ==
Babers began his coaching career as a graduate assistant at Hawaii in 1984. From there, Babers coached at numerous schools highlighted by offensive coordinator positions at both Arizona and Texas A&M as well as an assistant head coach position with UCLA. After four years as an assistant at Baylor, on December 9, 2011, Babers was named as the new head football coach at Eastern Illinois University to replace Bob Spoo. In two seasons at Eastern Illinois, the Panthers made the playoffs both times, led by quarterback Jimmy Garoppolo, who was a second-round pick in the 2014 NFL draft.

On December 18, 2013, Babers was hired as the new head coach at Bowling Green following the departure of previous Falcons' coach Dave Clawson to Wake Forest. Babers led Bowling Green to the 2015 Mid-American Conference (MAC) championship.

On December 5, 2015, Babers became the head coach at Syracuse.

After a 10-win season in 2018, Babers received a contract extension through the 2023 season. Babers was fired from his role as head coach at Syracuse on November 19, 2023, one game before the end of the 2023 regular season. Babers had only two winning seasons during his eight years at Syracuse.

New University of Arizona head coach Brent Brennan hired Babers as offensive coordinator in February 2024. Brennan was a graduate assistant at Arizona during Babers' first tenure as offensive coordinator in 2000. Brennan moved play-calling duties to tight ends coach Matt Adkins early in the season. Babers' contract was not renewed following the 2024 season.

== Head coaching record ==
Year	Team	Overall	Conference	Standing	Bowl/playoffs	Coaches^{#}	AP/TSN^{°}
Eastern Illinois Panthers (Ohio Valley Conference) (2012–2013)
2012	Eastern Illinois	7–5	6–1	1st	L NCAA Division I First Round	25	
2013	Eastern Illinois	12–2	8–0	1st	L NCAA Division I Quarterfinal	4	4
Eastern Illinois:		19–7	14–1				
Bowling Green Falcons (Mid-American Conference) (2014–2015)
2014	Bowling Green	8–6	5–3	1st (East)	W Camellia		
2015	Bowling Green	10–3	7–1	1st (East)	GoDaddy (Note: Babers resigned before bowl game)		
Bowling Green:		18–9	12–4				
Syracuse Orange (Atlantic Coast Conference) (2016–2023)
2016	Syracuse	4–8	2–6	T–6th (Atlantic)			
2017	Syracuse	4–8	2–6	7th (Atlantic)			
2018	Syracuse	10–3	6–2	2nd (Atlantic)	W Camping World	15	15
2019	Syracuse	5–7	2–6	6th (Atlantic)			
2020	Syracuse	1–10	1–9	T–14th			
2021	Syracuse	5–7	2–6	T–6th (Atlantic)			
2022	Syracuse	7–6	4–4	T–3rd (Atlantic)	L Pinstripe		
2023	Syracuse	5–6 (Note: Syracuse fired Babers with one game remaining)	1–6				
Syracuse:		41–55	20–45				
Total:		78–71					
National championship Conference title Conference division title or championship game berth
^{#}Rankings from final The Sports Network FCS Poll.; ^{°}Rankings from final FCS Coaches Poll.
