= 2021 Syracuse Orange football team =

American college football season

2021 Syracuse Orange football
- Conference: Atlantic Coast Conference
- Atlantic Division
- Record: 5–7 (2–6 ACC)
- Head coach: Dino Babers (6th season)
- Offensive coordinator: Sterlin Gilbert (2nd season)
- Offensive scheme: Veer and shoot
- Defensive coordinator: Tony White (2nd season)
- Base defense: 3–3–5
- Home stadium: Carrier Dome

Uniform
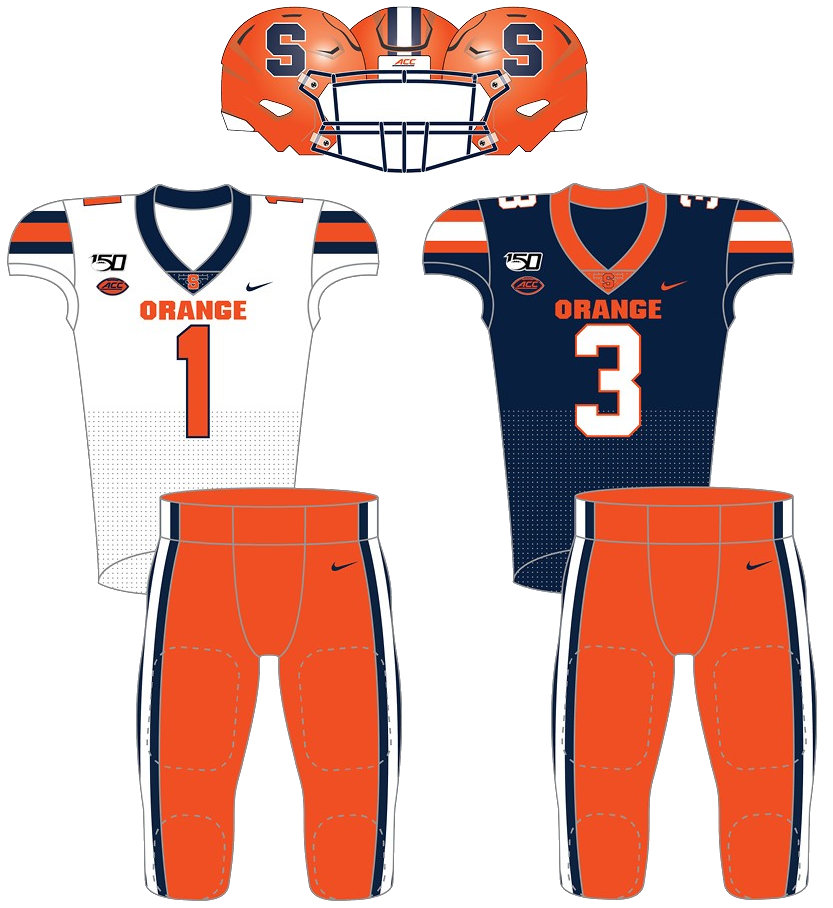

2021 Atlantic Coast Conference football standings
| | Conf. | | | Overall |
| Team | W | | L | W | | L |
|---|---|---|---|---|---|---|
Atlantic Division
| No. 15 Wake Forest xy | 7 | – | 1 | 11 | – | 3 |
| No. 20 NC State | 6 | – | 2 | 9 | – | 3 |
| No. 14 Clemson | 6 | – | 2 | 10 | – | 3 |
| Louisville | 4 | – | 4 | 6 | – | 7 |
| Florida State | 4 | – | 4 | 5 | – | 7 |
| Boston College | 2 | – | 6 | 6 | – | 6 |
| Syracuse | 2 | – | 6 | 5 | – | 7 |
Coastal Division
| No. 13 Pittsburgh xy$ | 7 | – | 1 | 11 | – | 3 |
| Miami (FL) | 5 | – | 3 | 7 | – | 5 |
| Virginia Tech | 4 | – | 4 | 6 | – | 7 |
| Virginia | 4 | – | 4 | 6 | – | 6 |
| North Carolina | 3 | – | 5 | 6 | – | 7 |
| Georgia Tech | 2 | – | 6 | 3 | – | 9 |
| Duke | 0 | – | 8 | 3 | – | 9 |
Championship: Pittsburgh 45, Wake Forest 21
$ – Conference champion; x – Division champion/co-champions; y – Championship game participant; Rankings from AP Poll

The 2021 Syracuse Orange football team represented Syracuse University during the 2021 NCAA Division I FBS football season. The Orange were led by sixth-year head coach Dino Babers and played their home games at the Carrier Dome, competing as members of the Atlantic Coast Conference.

== Offseason ==
=== Offseason departures ===
==== NFL draftees ====
| Player | Round | Pick | Team | Position |
|---|---|---|---|---|
| Andre Cisco | 3 | 61 | Jacksonville Jaguars | S |
| Ifeatu Melifonwu | 3 | 101 | Detroit Lions | CB |

==== Undrafted free agents ====
| Player | Team | Position | Ref |
|---|---|---|---|
| Nolan Cooney | New Orleans Saints | P | |
| Trill Williams | New Orleans Saints | S | |

== Schedule ==
The ACC released their schedule on January 28, 2021.

| Date | Time | Opponent | Site | TV | Result | Attendance |
|---|---|---|---|---|---|---|
| September 4 | 7:00 p.m. | at Ohio* | Peden Stadium; Athens, OH | CBSSN | W 29–9 | 23,904 |
| September 11 | 2:00 p.m. | Rutgers* | Carrier Dome; Syracuse, NY | ACCN | L 7–17 | 31,941 |
| September 18 | 12:00 p.m. | Albany* | Carrier Dome; Syracuse, NY | ACCN | W 62–24 | 30,156 |
| September 24 | 8:00 p.m. | Liberty* | Carrier Dome; Syracuse, NY | ACCN | W 24–21 | 29,942 |
| October 2 | 3:30 p.m. | at Florida State | Doak Campbell Stadium; Tallahassee, FL | ACCN | L 30–33 | 56,609 |
| October 9 | 3:30 p.m. | No. 19 Wake Forest | Carrier Dome; Syracuse, NY | ESPN2 | L 37–40 ^{OT} | 38,554 |
| October 15 | 7:00 p.m. | Clemson | Carrier Dome; Syracuse, NY | ESPN | L 14–17 | 36,670 |
| October 23 | 12:30 p.m. | at Virginia Tech | Lane Stadium; Blacksburg, VA | ACCRSN | W 41–36 | 57,941 |
| October 30 | 3:30 p.m. | Boston College | Carrier Dome; Syracuse, NY | ACCRSN | W 21–6 | 32,022 |
| November 13 | 12:00 p.m. | at Louisville | Cardinal Stadium; Louisville, KY | ACCRSN | L 3–41 | 43,797 |
| November 20 | 4:00 p.m. | at No. 20 NC State | Carter–Finley Stadium; Raleigh, NC | ACCN | L 17–41 | 54,083 |
| November 27 | 7:30 p.m. | No. 17 Pittsburgh | Carrier Dome; Syracuse, NY (rivalry) | ACCN | L 14–31 | 27,939 |
*Non-conference game; Rankings from AP Poll (and CFP Rankings, after November 2) - Released prior to game; All times are in Eastern time

== Game summaries ==
=== At Ohio ===
| | 1 | 2 | 3 | 4 | Total |
|---|---|---|---|---|---|
| Orange | 9 | 3 | 10 | 7 | 29 |
| Bobcats | 0 | 6 | 0 | 3 | 9 |

=== Rutgers ===
| | 1 | 2 | 3 | 4 | Total |
|---|---|---|---|---|---|
| Scarlet Knights | 0 | 0 | 14 | 3 | 17 |
| Orange | 0 | 0 | 7 | 0 | 7 |

=== Albany ===
| | 1 | 2 | 3 | 4 | Total |
|---|---|---|---|---|---|
| Great Danes | 10 | 0 | 0 | 14 | 24 |
| Orange | 21 | 24 | 10 | 7 | 62 |

=== Liberty ===
| | 1 | 2 | 3 | 4 | Total |
|---|---|---|---|---|---|
| Flames | 0 | 7 | 7 | 7 | 21 |
| Orange | 0 | 14 | 7 | 3 | 24 |

=== At Florida State ===
| | 1 | 2 | 3 | 4 | Total |
|---|---|---|---|---|---|
| Orange | 0 | 13 | 7 | 10 | 30 |
| Seminoles | 3 | 13 | 7 | 10 | 33 |

=== No. 19 Wake Forest ===
| | 1 | 2 | 3 | 4 | OT | Total |
|---|---|---|---|---|---|---|
| No. 19 Demon Deacons | 3 | 14 | 9 | 8 | 6 | 40 |
| Orange | 7 | 14 | 6 | 7 | 3 | 37 |

=== Clemson ===
| | 1 | 2 | 3 | 4 | Total |
|---|---|---|---|---|---|
| Tigers | 0 | 14 | 0 | 3 | 17 |
| Orange | 0 | 7 | 0 | 7 | 14 |

=== At Virginia Tech ===
| | 1 | 2 | 3 | 4 | Total |
|---|---|---|---|---|---|
| Orange | 7 | 6 | 7 | 21 | 41 |
| Hokies | 7 | 12 | 7 | 10 | 36 |

=== Boston College ===
| | 1 | 2 | 3 | 4 | Total |
|---|---|---|---|---|---|
| Eagles | 0 | 3 | 3 | 0 | 6 |
| Orange | 0 | 0 | 21 | 0 | 21 |

=== At Louisville ===
| | 1 | 2 | 3 | 4 | Total |
|---|---|---|---|---|---|
| Orange | 3 | 0 | 0 | 0 | 3 |
| Cardinals | 14 | 21 | 3 | 3 | 41 |

=== At No. 20 NC State ===
| | 1 | 2 | 3 | 4 | Total |
|---|---|---|---|---|---|
| Orange | 0 | 7 | 3 | 7 | 17 |
| No. 20 Wolfpack | 0 | 28 | 10 | 3 | 41 |

=== No. 17 Pittsburgh ===
| | 1 | 2 | 3 | 4 | Total |
|---|---|---|---|---|---|
| No. 17 Panthers | 0 | 14 | 14 | 3 | 31 |
| Orange | 7 | 0 | 7 | 0 | 14 |
