= Jim Collins (linebacker) =

American football player (born 1958)

No. 50, 55
- Position: Linebacker

Personal information
- Born: June 11, 1958 (age 68); Orange, New Jersey, U.S.
- Listed height: 6 ft 2 in (1.88 m)
- Listed weight: 230 lb (104 kg)

Career information
- High school: West Morris Mendham (Mendham Borough, New Jersey)
- College: Syracuse
- NFL draft: 1981: 2nd round, 43rd overall pick

Career history
- Los Angeles Rams (1981–1988); San Diego Chargers (1989)

Awards and highlights
- First-team All-Pro (1985); Second-team All-Pro (1984); Pro Bowl (1985); 3× First-team All-East (1978, 1979, 1980)

Career NFL statistics
- Interceptions: 6
- Sacks: 4.5
- Fumble recoveries: 6
- Stats at Pro Football Reference

James Brian Collins (born June 11, 1958) is an American former professional football player who was a linebacker in the National Football League (NFL). He played college football for the Syracuse Orange. He played in the NFL for the Los Angeles Rams and was named to the Pro Bowl in 1985. He also played for the San Diego Chargers.

== Early life ==
Collins graduated from West Morris Mendham High School in the Class of 1976, where, as a senior, he helped lead his high school football team to a still standing club record eight shutouts and its only state championship victory to date. He subsequently attended Syracuse University on a full athletic scholarship at linebacker. In 1980, Collins was an honorable mention All-American by the Associated Press. He was later named to the Syracuse all-century team.

== Professional career ==
Collins was selected in the second round (43rd overall pick) of the 1981 NFL draft as a linebacker by the Los Angeles Rams. He was considered a leader of the Rams' defense of the mid-1980s. He made one appearance in the Pro Bowl, with the Rams in 1985, and was a Pro Bowl alternate in 1984. Due to a shoulder injury, Collins spent the 1986 season on the injured reserve list. Overall, he played in the NFL for seven seasons with the Rams (1981–1985, 1987–1988), and then spent one season with the San Diego Chargers (1989).

Collins also appeared in the 1986 Rams promotional video, Let's Ram It, where he goes by the nickname "Babyface" and refers to himself as a "tacklin' fool on the football field."
