= Mike Siano =

American football player (born 1963)

No. 86
- Position: Wide receiver

Personal information
- Born: November 29, 1963 (age 62); Yeadon, Pennsylvania, U.S.
- Listed height: 6 ft 4 in (1.93 m)
- Listed weight: 220 lb (100 kg)

Career information
- High school: Springfield; Haverford
- College: Syracuse
- NFL draft: 1986: undrafted

Career history
- Cleveland Browns (1986)*; St. Louis Cardinals (1987)*; Philadelphia Eagles (1987)
- * Offseason or practice squad member only

Awards and highlights
- Second-team All-East (1985)

Career NFL statistics
- Receptions: 9
- Receiving yards: 137
- Touchdowns: 1
- Stats at Pro Football Reference

Michael P. Siano (born November 29, 1963) is an American former professional football player who was a wide receiver for the Philadelphia Eagles of the National Football League (NFL). He played college football for the Syracuse Orange.

Siano also played rugby union for the national team.
