= Ross Krautman =

American football player (born 1991)

No. 37
- Position: Placekicker

Personal information
- Born: February 1991 (age 35); Englewood, New Jersey, U.S.
- Listed height: 5 ft 8 in (1.73 m)
- Listed weight: 160 lb (73 kg)

Career information
- High school: Ramapo High School
- College: Syracuse (2010–2014)

Awards and highlights
- Second-team All-Big East (2010)
- Stats at ESPN

Ross Jordan Krautman (born 1991) is a former All-American football placekicker who played for the Syracuse Orange. He was a three-time NJ All State high school football player/high school football All-American receiving full scholarships from Syracuse University, Miami University of Ohio, University of Louisville, West Virginia University, Rutgers University and Southern Mississippi University. At Syracuse, he made All-American his freshman year.

== Early life ==
Krautman was born in February 1991 in Englewood, New Jersey to Jeff and Sharon Krautman. He played football while attending Ramapo High School. In 2009, he made 123-of-124 PATs, setting a New Jersey state record, and highest extra point percentage in state history, in addition to holding the state record for most consecutive PATs in a career with 81. He also made 34 field goals during his high school career. He had the highest kickoff touchback percentage rate in school history. He was rated a two-star football prospect by Scout.com and top 5 rated high school football placekicker in the country for the 2010 class by Max Emfinger Recruiting. He also played in the 2010 All-American Bowl.

== College career ==
As a freshman in 2010, Krautman hit 18 total field goals, tying the single-season school record, and was named Rookie Male Athlete of the Year. He also hit 16 consecutive field goals, which again tied the single season school record. At the end of the season, he was ranked 21st nationally and tied for second among Big East kickers with 1.38 field goals per game. His 95% field goal percentage (18 for 19) led the conference. His numbers of total and consecutive field goals and field goal percentage tied three single-season Syracuse records held by Gary Anderson. He was named a Freshman All-American by the Football Writers Association of America, Sporting News and Rivals. Because of his performance during his freshman season, Krautman was placed on the preseason watchlist for the 2011 Lou Groza Award.

Krautman was the leading point scorer for Syracuse during the 2010, 2011 and 2012 seasons. In 2013, during his senior year, Krautman suffered a hip injury and didn't play for the remainder of the season. Following this, he received a medical waiver to return to Syracuse for a fifth year of eligibility. However, he retired from football before the 2014 season due to chronic effects of his injury.
