= Avatus Stone =

American gridiron football player (1931–2000)

No. 88, 89, 18
- Positions: Running back, punter

Personal information
- Born: April 21, 1931; Washington, D.C., U.S.
- Died: November 2, 2000 (aged 69); Fairfax, Virginia, U.S.
- Listed height: 6 ft 1 in (1.85 m)
- Listed weight: 195 lb (88 kg)

Career information
- High school: Armstrong
- College: Syracuse
- NFL draft: 1953: 9th round, 100th overall pick

Career history
- Ottawa Rough Riders (1953–1956); Montreal Alouettes (1957); Baltimore Colts (1958)

Awards and highlights
- NFL champion (1958); 2× CFL All-Star (1953, 1955); Second-team All-Eastern (1951); Jeff Russel Memorial Trophy (1955)

Career NFL statistics
- Punts: 1
- Punting yards: 28
- Stats at Pro Football Reference

Avatus Harry Stone (April 21, 1931 – November 2, 2000) was an American gridiron football player. After playing his college football at Syracuse University, Stone was drafted by the Chicago Cardinals in the 1953 NFL draft, but played professionally in Canada with the Ottawa Rough Riders from 1953 to 1956. His best year was playing tailback in 1955 when he won the Jeff Russel Memorial Trophy as best player in the East. He played seven games for the Montreal Alouettes in 1957, and finished his career in 1958 with the Baltimore Colts of the NFL, playing one game, and punting once for 28 yards.

== Early life ==
In his high school days at Armstrong High from 1944 to 1946, Stone lettered in football, basketball and baseball.

== College career ==
Stone entered Syracuse University in 1949 to become the first black player under Coach Ben Schwartzwalder. In his rookie season, he set records with a 67-yard punt and three interceptions in one game. In 1951, he was moved to the quarterback position due to an injury to starting quarterback Pete Stark, making him the only black QB for a major college team that season. He made the most of the opportunity, throwing a school record three touchdowns in a game against Fordham. However, two days before the start of his senior season, he injured his knee. Thus he wasn't able to play out his final season. He finished his college career with career totals of 12 interceptions and a punting average of 39.7

Stone endured racism at Syracuse. He couldn't fraternize with white teammates or students. He was labeled as a "trouble-maker".

== Professional career ==
Stone was selected in the ninth round by the Chicago Cardinals in the 1953 NFL draft. However, instead of entering the league, he signed with the Ottawa Rough Riders of the CFL where he played for three seasons. He earned the Jeff Russel Memorial Trophy as best player in the East in 1955. He was traded to the Montreal Alouettes in 1957 but only played seven games.

In 1958 he signed with the Baltimore Colts and played one game, notching up a single 28-yard punt in a game against the Green Bay Packers. He retired from football at the end of the season.

== Personal life ==
Stone went on to become president of a consulting firm. He later taught and coached at Phelps Vocational High School before becoming national director of recruiting for minority colleges with the Peace Corps. He died of cancer in 2000.
