= Alec Lemon =

American gridiron football player (born 1991)

No. 17
- Position: Wide receiver

Personal information
- Born: July 1, 1991 (age 35); Aurora, Colorado, U.S.
- Listed height: 6 ft 1 in (1.85 m)
- Listed weight: 207 lb (94 kg)

Career information
- High school: Gambrills (MD) Arundel
- College: Syracuse
- NFL draft: 2013: undrafted

Career history
- Houston Texans (2013–2014); Baltimore Ravens (2014)*; Saskatchewan Roughriders (2016)*
- * Offseason or practice squad member only

Awards and highlights
- First-team All-Big East (2012); Second-team All-Big East (2011); Syracuse - All-Time Leader Pass Receptions
- Stats at Pro Football Reference

Alec Tyler Lemon (born July 1, 1991) is an American former football wide receiver. He played college football for the Syracuse Orange and was signed as an undrafted free agent by the Houston Texans in 2013.

Lemon is currently an educator at Glen Burnie High School, Glen Burnie Maryland and the Head Football Coach of the Glen Burnie Gophers.

== Early life ==
Lemon attended Arundel Senior High School in Gambrills, Maryland where he played both offense and defense. He set the record for the most receiving yards his senior year with a total of 1,616, while tying the records for touchdowns (23) and receptions (103). He also added 30 tackles, 6 interceptions, and 2 forced fumbles while on the defensive side of the ball.

Lemon was also known for playing baseball during high school and recognized as someone who helped the local community as a volunteer for the Arundel School Mentoring Program. As a senior, he was team captain and a first-team all-state selection by the Associated Press for football.

== College career ==
Lemon attended Syracuse University where he played wide receiver. His senior year, he caught 73 passes for 1,074 yards including 7 touchdowns. This earned him an All-Big East Conference selection. This followed up on his junior year where he caught 69 passes for 834 yards and second-team All-Big East honors. His senior year, he also became the all-time leader in pass receptions for the Orangemen, a title previously held by Rob Moore.

Lemon played in the 2013 Senior Bowl prior to working out with other NFL prospects at the NFL Combine.

== Professional career ==
Lemon was taken as an undrafted free agent by the Houston Texans following the NFL Draft. Lemon impressed through the camp and the preseason to make the Texans roster and was placed on injured reserve throughout the 2013 campaign. Lemon was released from the Texans the following year and was added to the Baltimore Ravens practice squad in 2014. Following a brief stint with the Saskatchewan Roughriders, Lemon was done with his professional football career.

In 2020, Lemon was named head coach of the Glen Burnie Senior High School football team. Lemon is also a physical education and life sciences educator at Glen Burnie. Glen Burnie had not had a winning season in 20 years when Lemon took over. In his first season, the team went 2–7 while the COVID pandemic continued in 2021; however, in his second season (2022), Glen Burnie finished 5–4, hosted its first playoff game in school history winning 39–7 against Parkville High School before losing to Old Mill in the second round of the playoffs. In 2023, Lemon led Glen Burnie to a 6–3 regular season record and again dispatched the first-round opponent - Meade High School - by a 28–27 score.
