= Jimmy Ridlon =

American football player (born 1934)

- Ridlon in 1961

No. 42
- Position: Safety

Personal information
- Born: July 11, 1934 (age 92); Nanuet, New York, U.S.
- Listed height: 6 ft 1 in (1.85 m)
- Listed weight: 181 lb (82 kg)

Career information
- High school: Nyack (Nyack, New York)
- College: Syracuse
- NFL draft: 1957: 4th round, 39th overall pick

Career history
- San Francisco 49ers (1957–1962); Dallas Cowboys (1963–1964)

Awards and highlights
- Second-team All-Pro (1964); Second-team All-East (1956)

Career NFL statistics
- Interceptions: 9
- Fumble recoveries: 6
- Total touchdowns: 2
- Stats at Pro Football Reference

James Arthur Ridlon Sr. (born July 11, 1934) is an American former professional football player who was a safety in the National Football League (NFL) for the San Francisco 49ers and Dallas Cowboys. He played college football and college lacrosse at Syracuse University. After football he became a sports painter and sculptor.

== Early life ==
Ridlon had to learn how to manage dyslexia and a stutter throughout his first years of school. He attended Nyack High School, where he received All-County recognition as a quarterback in football and a guard in basketball.

He accepted a football scholarship from Syracuse University. He played offensive end as a sophomore. The next year, he was moved to halfback in the same backfield with Jim Brown, registering a school record 3 touchdown receptions in one game.

As a senior in a game against Holy Cross, he scored in three different ways (reception, run and interception). He posted 6 interceptions in the season. He finished his college career with 103 carries for 391 yards, 3 rushing touchdowns, 17 receptions for 357 yards, 3 receiving touchdowns, 6-of-11 completions for 139 yards, 2 passing touchdowns and one interception.

He received a bachelor's degree from the College of Visual and Performing Arts in 1957 and a masters degree from VPA in 1961.

In 1990, he was inducted into the Greater Syracuse Sports Hall of Fame.

== Professional career ==
=== San Francisco 49ers ===
Ridlon was selected by the San Francisco 49ers in the fourth round (39th overall) of the 1957 NFL draft. In his second season, he was a starter at safety, registering 4 interceptions and 2 fumble recoveries. He would mostly have a reserve role in the following seasons.

In 1962, he appeared in 9 games (6 starts), posting one interception and one fumble recovery. He suffered 2 broken vertebrae in the 24-17 win against the Los Angeles Rams during the tenth game, missing the rest of the season.

On April 30, 1963, he was traded to the Dallas Cowboys in exchange for linebacker Mike Dowdle, who was a former 49ers draft choice.

=== Dallas Cowboys ===
In 1963, head coach Tom Landry traded for him because he considered Ridlon one of the smartest players in the NFL. He was mostly a backup until Cornell Green was moved to cornerback, appearing in 7 games with 4 starts.

In 1964, he intercepted 4 passes and received All-NFL honors in some publications. He returned an interception for a 74-yard touchdown and a fumble for a 63-yard touchdown, becoming the first player in franchise history to score 2 defensive touchdowns in the same season. On April 16, 1965, he announced his retirement to become a faculty member and assistant football coach at Syracuse University.

== Artistic career ==
After his football career, he became a sports painter and sculptor. In 1988, he was commissioned to design and sculpt the Outland Trophy, which has become one of college football's most prestigious awards.

== Personal life ==
In 1965, he returned to Syracuse University to teach art classes and double as a backfield coach for the football team under Ben Schwartzwalder for 6 years. He was a professor of painting, sculpture and design in Syracuse's College of Arts and Sciences between 1965 and 2000. He also wrote a novel and worked as a color commentator on the Syracuse University football radio broadcasts for over 20 years.

In 2015, he received the Tom Osborne Legacy Award by the Rotary Club of Omaha and the Greater Omaha Sports Committee.
