= Ryan Nassib =

American football player (born 1990)

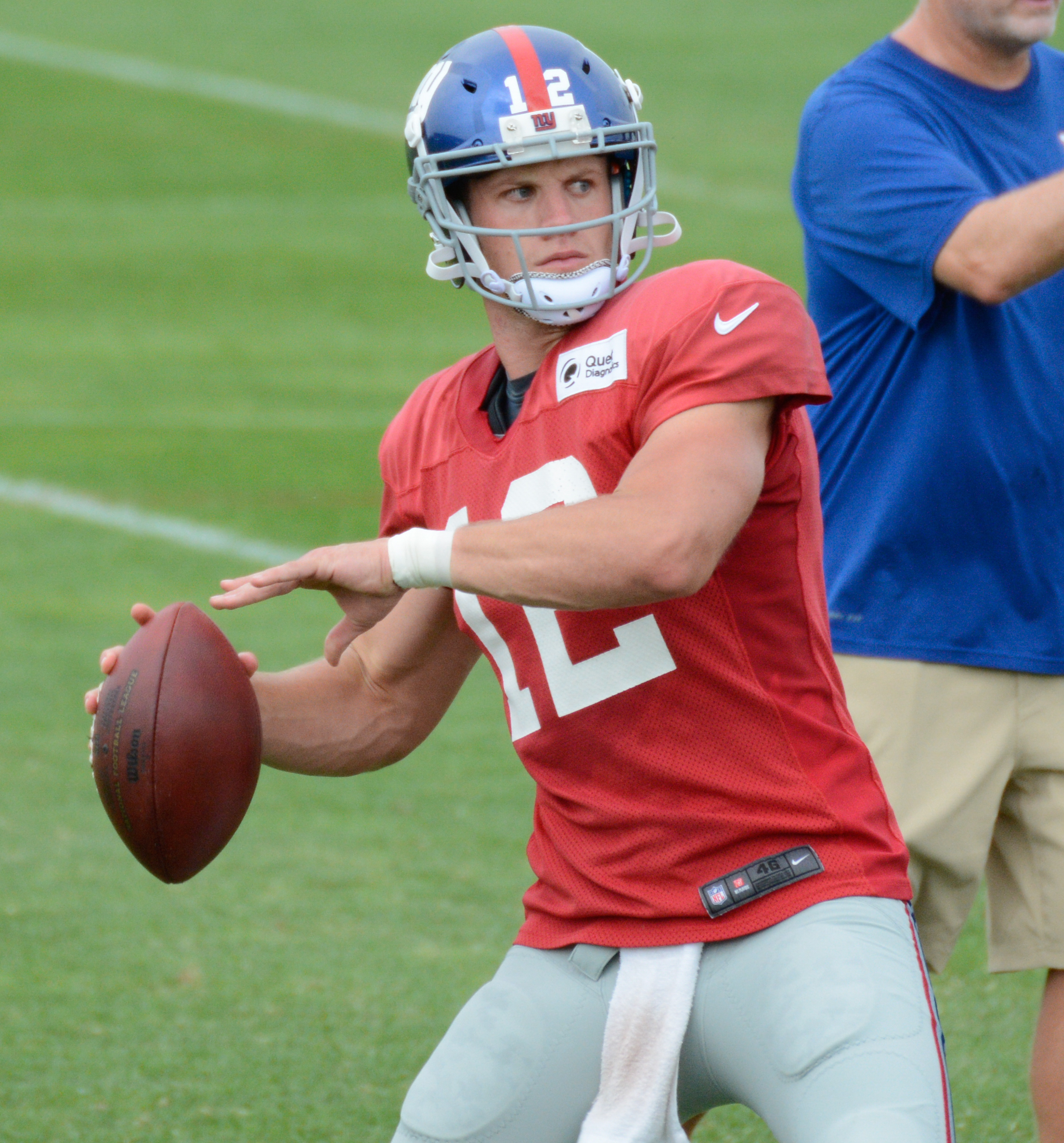
- Nassib with the New York Giants in 2016

No. 9, 12, 4
- Position: Quarterback

Personal information
- Born: March 10, 1990 (age 36); West Chester, Pennsylvania, U.S.
- Listed height: 6 ft 2 in (1.88 m)
- Listed weight: 223 lb (101 kg)

Career information
- High school: Malvern Preparatory School (Malvern, Pennsylvania)
- College: Syracuse (2008–2012)
- NFL draft: 2013: 4th round, 110th overall pick

Career history
- New York Giants (2013–2016); New Orleans Saints (2017)*; Jacksonville Jaguars (2017)
- * Offseason or practice squad member only

Awards and highlights
- First-team All-American (2012); Second-team All-Big East (2012)

Career NFL statistics
- Pass completions: 9
- Pass attempts: 10
- TD–INT: 1–0
- Passing yards: 128
- Passer rating: 152.1
- Stats at Pro Football Reference

Ryan Paul Nassib (born March 10, 1990) is an American former professional football player who was a quarterback in the National Football League (NFL). He played college football for the Syracuse Orange. He was selected by the New York Giants in the fourth round of the 2013 NFL draft. He was also a member of the Jacksonville Jaguars.

== Early life ==
Ryan Paul Nassib was born on March 10, 1990, in West Chester, Pennsylvania. He attended Malvern Preparatory School in Malvern, Pennsylvania.

== College career ==
Nassib received an athletic scholarship to attend Syracuse University, where he played for the Orange from 2008 to 2012. He redshirted the 2008 season, sitting on the bench behind Cameron Dantley. Nassib was named as Syracuse's new starting quarterback during 2009 spring practices, jumping over Dantley and Andrew Robinson. After just one week of fall practice, however, head coach Doug Marrone named Duke transfer Greg Paulus as the team's 2009 starter. Backing up Paulus, Nassib played 10 games during the 2009 season where he played a role in specific offensive packages against Minnesota and Northwestern. Against Penn State, he completed 4-of-5 passes for 30 yards, including his first completion on his first career pass. He ended the 2009 season throwing for 422 yards and three touchdowns with a 116.69 QB rating.

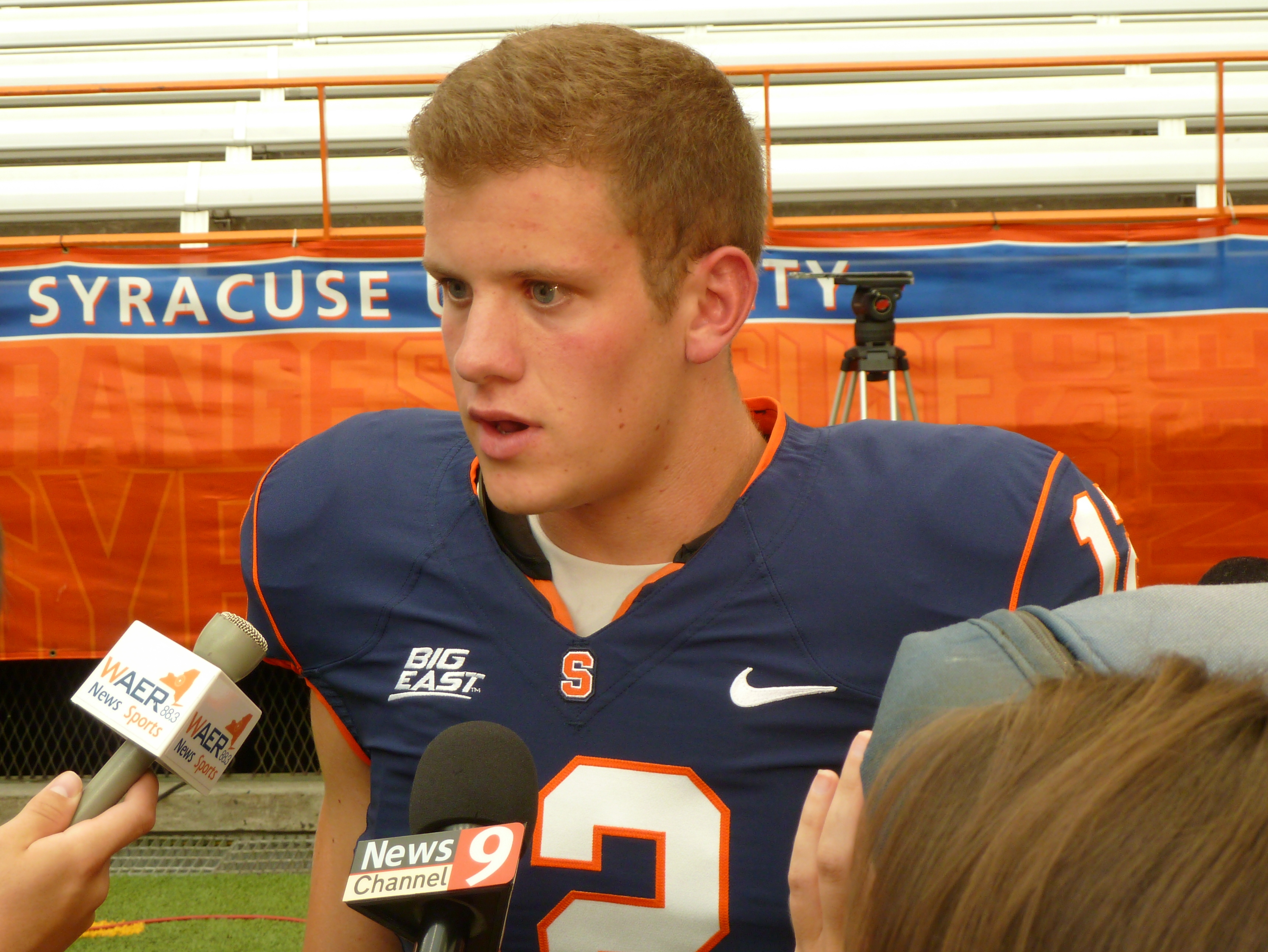
Nassib in 2010

With the departure of Paulus, Ryan moved up the depth chart as he became the starter for the Orange for the 2010 season. Nassib threw at least one touchdown pass in eleven games as he tied for fourth on Syracuse's single-season record list with 19 touchdown passes. At Akron, Nassib led Syracuse to its first season-opening victory since 2003 as he threw for 229 yards and two touchdowns on 17 of 27 completions. Against Washington, he completed 17 of 35 passes for 202 yards and a touchdown as he also ran for 39 yards and one touchdown on seven carries. His 28-yard rushing touchdown was the first of his career. Against Maine, Nassib set a school record with five touchdown passes. Nassib piloted a 98-yard scoring drive in the fourth quarter and a three-yard touchdown completion to Marcus Sales to win the game against South Florida. The Orange finished the 2010 season with a 7–5 record and a Pinstripe Bowl win with Ryan completing 13–21 pass attempts for 239 yards and three touchdowns, including a career long 52-yard completion.

In the 2011 season, he set the Syracuse single-season records for completion (259) and passing yards (2,685) and tied the mark for touchdown passes in one season (22). Down 15 points in the season opener against Wake Forest, Nassib led the Orange to a comeback win in overtime with a 4-yard touchdown pass to Van Chew. He finished the game completing 20 of 28 passes and 178 yards, including 8 consecutive passes in the fourth quarter and overtime. Nassib earned Big East Weekly Honor Roll recognition with a 25 for 37, 230 yard, one touchdown performance against USC. Nassib was once again named to the Big East Weekly Honor Roll against Toledo as he completed 16 of 24 passes for 213 yards and two touchdowns in an overtime victory. Although Syracuse ended the 2011 season with a disappointing 5–7 record, Nassib had a decent season as he had a .624 pass completion percentage record, 2,724 yards of total offense ranks second and 223.8 average passing yards.

Nassib started the 2012 season strong against Northwestern completing 45 of 66 passes for 482 yards and four touchdown passes as the Orange lost by a score of 41–42. His performance earned him Big East Offensive Player of the Week honors as he set Big East records for pass completions, pass attempts, and passing yards. Against the undefeated Louisville Cardinals in his last game at the Carrier Dome, Nassib led the Orange to a 45–26 victory as he completed 15 of 23 passes for 246 yards and 3 touchdown passes. With wins against Missouri and Temple, the Orange had a 7–5 record and were bowl-eligible. Syracuse beat West Virginia 38–14 in the Pinstripe Bowl. In his final college game, Nassib completed 12 of 24 passing attempts for 134 yards, 1 interception, and 2 touchdown passes. Nassib was named the National Football Foundation National Scholar-Athlete Award winner presented by Fidelity Investments and he also made the 2012 Capital One Academic All-District Team selection. The senior signal was named a to Pro Football Weekly's 2012 All-America Team. Nassib finished his career with Syracuse breaking the school total passing yards record (9,060), pass completions (780), and passing yards per game (201.3). Nassib became the fourth Big East quarterback to pass for more than 9,000 yards.

== Professional career ==
Pre-draft measurables
Height	Weight	40-yard dash	10-yard split	20-yard split	20-yard shuttle	Three-cone drill	Vertical jump	Broad jump	Wonderlic
6 ft 2 in (1.88 m)	227 lb (103 kg)	5.06 s	1.83 s	2.96 s	4.53 s	7.34 s	28 1/2 in (0.72 m)	8 ft 9 in (2.67 m)	41
All values from NFL Combine

=== New York Giants ===
Nassib was selected with the 110th overall pick in the fourth round of the 2013 NFL draft by the New York Giants. He was the primary backup to starting quarterback Eli Manning.

Nassib made his NFL debut in the 2014 NFL season in a 45–14 win over the Washington Redskins in Week 4.

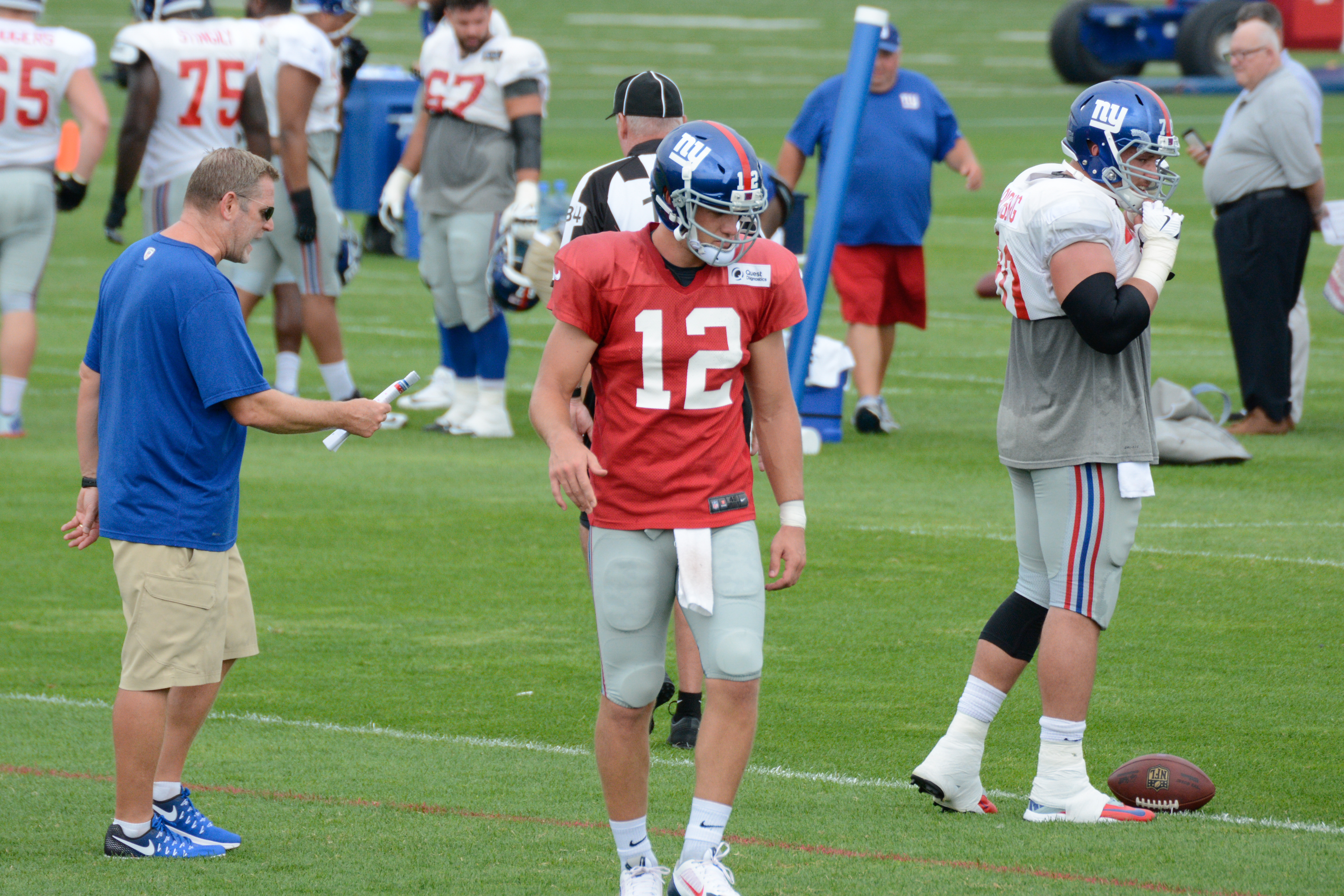
Nassib with the Giants in 2016

On December 27, 2015, in a 49–17 loss to the Minnesota Vikings, Nassib threw his first NFL touchdown pass to wide receiver Myles White in the fourth quarter. He finished the game passing 5-for-5, 68 yards, and one touchdown, along with a 158.3 perfect passer rating.

Nassib was placed on injured reserve on December 20, 2016.

=== New Orleans Saints ===
On June 12, 2017, Nassib signed a contract with the New Orleans Saints. He was released on September 2, 2017.

=== Jacksonville Jaguars ===
On September 18, 2017, Nassib was signed by the Jacksonville Jaguars. He was released on October 7.

== Career statistics ==
=== NFL ===
Year	Team	GP	GS	Passing								Rushing			
Year	Team	GP	GS	Cmp	Att	Pct	Yds	Y/A	TD	Int	Rtg	Att	Yds	Avg	TD
2013	NYG	0	0	DNP											
2014	NYG	4	0	4	5	80.0	60	12.0	0	0	116.7	2	-3	-1.5	0
2015	NYG	1	0	5	5	100.0	68	13.6	1	0	158.3	0	0	0.0	0
2016	NYG	0	0	DNP											
Career		5	0	9	10	90.0	128	12.8	1	0	152.1	2	-3	-1.5	0

=== College ===
Year	Team	G	Cmp	Att	Pct	Yds	TD	Int	Lng	Y/G	Rtg
2009	Syracuse	10	36	68	52.9	422	3	1	50	42.2	116.7
2010	Syracuse	13	202	358	56.4	2,334	19	8	52	179.5	124.2
2011	Syracuse	12	259	415	62.4	2,685	22	9	62	238.8	129.9
2012	Syracuse	13	294	471	62.4	3,749	26	10	68	288.4	143.3
Career		38	791	1,312	58.5	9,235	70	28	68	115.1	128.5

== Personal life ==
Nassib is married to Madeline Paolantonio. He is the son of Mary and Gilbert Nassib. His father played tight end at the University of Delaware. He has four siblings: two younger brothers, John and Carl, and two sisters, Carey and Paige. Carl was drafted in the third round of the 2016 NFL draft by the Cleveland Browns while John is a former defensive end for the University of Delaware.
