= Steve Ishmael =

American football player (born 1995)

Profile
- Position: Wide receiver

Personal information
- Born: July 18, 1995 (age 31); Miami, Florida, U.S.
- Listed height: 6 ft 2 in (1.88 m)
- Listed weight: 209 lb (95 kg)

Career information
- High school: North Miami Beach (North Miami Beach, Florida)
- College: Syracuse
- NFL draft: 2018: undrafted

Career history
- Indianapolis Colts (2018–2019)

Awards and highlights
- First-team All-ACC (2017)
- Stats at Pro Football Reference

Steve Ishmael (born July 18, 1995) is an American former professional football wide receiver. He played college football for the Syracuse Orange football team from 2014 to 2017. As a senior, he ranked second among Division I FBS players with 105 receptions and broke Marvin Harrison's Syracuse career record for receiving yardage.

== Early life ==
Ishmael was born in 1995, the son of Blessed and Darlene Ishmael. He attended North Miami Beach High School where he set school records for touchdowns, receptions, and receiving yards. His older brother Kemal Ishmael played as a defensive back and linebacker for the Atlanta Falcons from 2013 to 2019.

== College career ==
Ishmael played college football for the Syracuse Orange from 2014 to 2017. In four years at Syracuse, he totaled 219 receptions for 2,891 yards and 18 touchdowns.

As a senior, Ishmael had eight games in which he totaled more than 100 receiving yards, including 143 yards against Florida State and 187 yards in his final college game against Boston College. For the season, he ranked second among all Division I FBS players with 105 receptions and third with 1,347 receiving yards. He broke Marvin Harrison's Syracuse career record for receiving yards; he also broke Amba Etta-Tawo Syracuse single-season record for receptions. At the end of the 2017 season, he was selected as a first-team player on the All-ACC team. He was also selected as a semifinalist for the Fred Biletnikoff Award. SB Nation named him first-team All-American.

== Professional career ==
After going undrafted in the 2018 NFL draft, Ishmael signed a free agent contract with the Indianapolis Colts on May 1, 2018. He was waived on September 1, 2018 and was signed to the practice squad the next day. He was promoted to the active roster on October 26, 2018. He was waived on November 9, 2018 and re-signed to the practice squad. He signed a reserve/future contract on January 13, 2019.

On August 7, 2019, Ishmael was placed on injured reserve with a knee injury. He was waived on April 27, 2020.
