= 2024 Syracuse Orange football team =

American college football season

2024 Syracuse Orange football

Holiday Bowl champion

Holiday Bowl, W 52–35 vs. Washington State
- Conference: Atlantic Coast Conference

Ranking
- Coaches: No. 22
- AP: No. 20
- Record: 10–3 (5–3 ACC)
- Head coach: Fran Brown (1st season)
- Offensive coordinator: Jeff Nixon (1st season)
- Co-offensive coordinator: Mike Johnson (3rd season)
- Offensive scheme: Spread
- Defensive coordinator: Elijah Robinson (1st season)
- Co-defensive coordinator: Robert Wright (1st season)
- Base defense: Multiple 4–2–5
- Home stadium: JMA Wireless Dome

Uniform
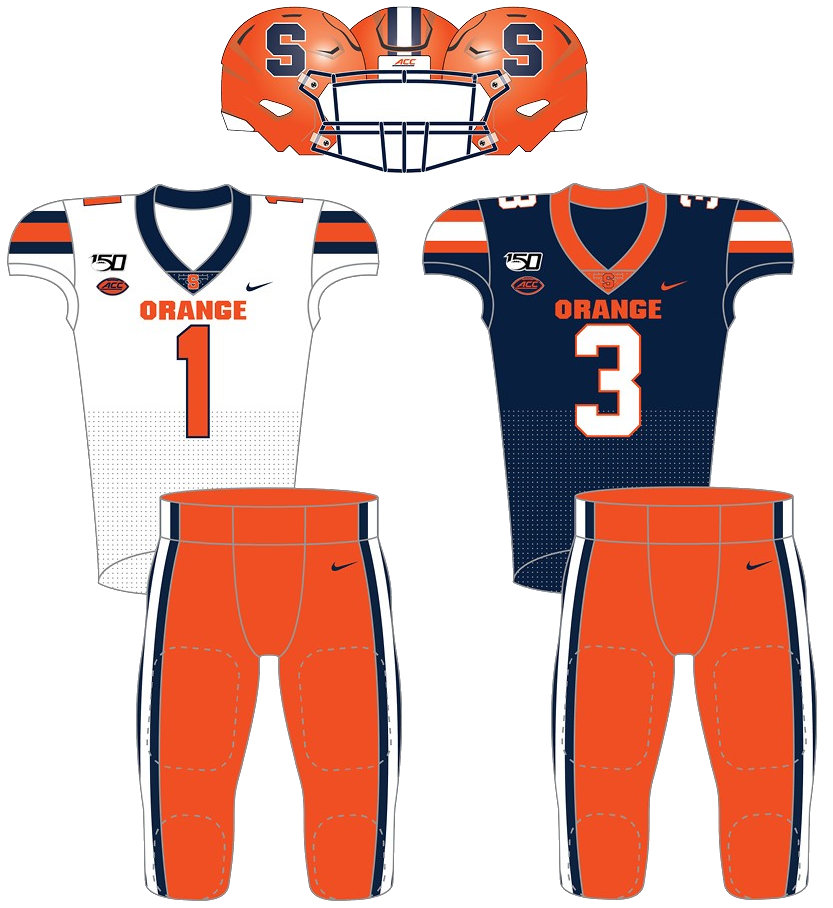

2024 Atlantic Coast Conference football standings
	Conf.			Overall
Team	W		L	W		L
No. 12 SMU y^	8	–	0	11	–	3
No. 14 Clemson y$^	7	–	1	10	–	4
No. 18 Miami (FL)	6	–	2	10	–	3
No. 20 Syracuse	5	–	3	10	–	3
Duke	5	–	3	9	–	4
Louisville	5	–	3	9	–	4
Georgia Tech	5	–	3	7	–	6
Boston College	4	–	4	7	–	6
Virginia Tech	4	–	4	6	–	7
Pittsburgh	3	–	5	7	–	6
NC State	3	–	5	6	–	7
North Carolina	3	–	5	6	–	7
Virginia	3	–	5	5	–	7
California	2	–	6	6	–	7
Wake Forest	2	–	6	4	–	8
Stanford	2	–	6	3	–	9
Florida State	1	–	7	2	–	10
Championship: Clemson 34, SMU 31
^ – College Football Playoff participant; $ – Conference champion; y – Championship game participant; Rankings from AP Poll

The 2024 Syracuse Orange football team represented Syracuse University as a member of the Atlantic Coast Conference (ACC) during the 2024 NCAA Division I FBS football season. The Orange played their home games at the JMA Wireless Dome. They were led by first-year head coach Fran Brown. The Orange were in their 123rd season overall and their twelfth as a member of the ACC.

On November 2, the Orange defeated Virginia Tech for their sixth win, securing bowl eligibility for the third season in a row. This was the first time the Orange were bowl eligible for three consecutive seasons since the program played in five straight bowls from 1995 through 1999.

In the regular season finale on November 30, the Orange defeated Miami (FL) to earn their ninth win and deny the Hurricanes a spot in the ACC championship game. Syracuse erased a 21-point first half deficit to win 42–38, which marked the largest comeback win in program history.

For the postseason, the Orange were selected to play in the Holiday Bowl against Washington State. The game was held on December 27 at Snapdragon Stadium, with the Orange winning 52–35. With the victory, Fran Brown joined Paul Pasqualoni as the only Syracuse football coaches to win ten games in their first seasons with the program. Quarterback Kyle McCord set the ACC single-season passing record in the game, finishing the year with 4,779 passing yards.

The 2024 season featured several notable accomplishments for the Orange. For the first time since 1998, Syracuse beat three AP-ranked teams (Miami (FL), UNLV, and Georgia Tech) in the same season. The Orange won nine regular season games and had ten overall wins for the first time in six seasons, and joined the 2001 and 2018 teams as the only Syracuse squads to win ten games since 2000.

== Offseason ==
=== Preseason ===
Dino Babers, who coached the team from 2016 to 2023, was fired from his role as head coach at Syracuse on November 19, 2023, one game before the end of the 2023 regular season. Babers had just two winning seasons during his eight years at Syracuse. He moved to become the offensive coordinator at the University of Arizona. First year offensive coordinator Jason Beck took the same position at New Mexico. First year defensive coordinator Rocky Long was hired as a defensive analyst at Fort Lewis College.

On November 28, 2023, Fran Brown was named the 31st head coach of the Orange. Brown was named #1 national recruiter by 247Sports in 2023, and previously served as the defensive backs coach at Georgia, Baylor, Rutgers, and Temple. His deep recruiting ties in South Jersey, one of Syracuse's primary recruiting grounds, were cited as a major reason for his hiring.

Jeff Nixon and Elijah Robinson were hired as OC and DC, respectively.

The Syracuse Orange were ranked 16th nationally with 77% of their production returning, according to data compiled by ESPN’s Bill Connelly.

=== Team departures ===
Over the course of the off-season, Syracuse lost over 35 players to graduation and to the transfer portal (29). No Orange players were selected in the 2024 NFL draft, but three former Orange were selected in the first round of the 2024 CFL draft.

=== Recruiting ===
Syracuse's 2024 class consisted of 25 signees. The class was ranked eighth in the ACC and 37th best overall by the 247Sports Composite.

College recruiting (2024)
Name	Hometown	School	Height	Weight	Commit date
KingJoseph Edwards; EDGE	Hoschton, GA	Mill Creek (GA)	6 ft 4 in (1.93 m)	220 lb (100 kg)	Dec 19, 2023
KingJoseph Edwards; EDGE	Recruit ratings: Rivals: 247Sports: ESPN:				
Michael Nwokocha; DL	Tyler, TX	Lake Highlands	6 ft 5 in (1.96 m)	290 lb (130 kg)	Jan 8, 2024
Michael Nwokocha; DL	Recruit ratings: Rivals: 247Sports: ESPN:				
Marcellus Barnes Jr. CB	Chattanooga, TN	McCallie School	5 ft 11.5 in (1.82 m)	170 lb (77 kg)	Jan 6, 2024
Marcellus Barnes Jr. CB	Recruit ratings: Rivals: 247Sports: ESPN:				
Yasin Willis; RB	Montvale, NJ	St. Joseph Regional	6 ft 0 in (1.83 m)	200 lb (91 kg)	Dec 10, 2023
Yasin Willis; RB	Recruit ratings: Rivals: 247Sports: ESPN:				
Caden Brown; EDGE	New York, NY	Erasmus Hall	6 ft 3 in (1.91 m)	205 lb (93 kg)	Dec 17, 2023
Caden Brown; EDGE	Recruit ratings: Rivals: 247Sports: ESPN:				
Maraad Watson; DL	Irvington, NJ	Irvington	6 ft 3 in (1.91 m)	285 lb (129 kg)	Dec 20, 2023
Maraad Watson; DL	Recruit ratings: Rivals: 247Sports: ESPN:				
Ta'Ron Haile; WR	Millville, NJ	Millville	6 ft 0 in (1.83 m)	170 lb (77 kg)	Jun 26, 2023
Ta'Ron Haile; WR	Recruit ratings: Rivals: 247Sports: ESPN:				
Jaden Hart; RB	Michigan City, IN	Michigan City	6 ft 0 in (1.83 m)	180 lb (82 kg)	Jun 10, 2023
Jaden Hart; RB	Recruit ratings: Rivals: 247Sports: ESPN:				
Jahide Lesaine Jr. TE	Sparta, NJ	Immaculate Conception	6 ft 4 in (1.93 m)	200 lb (91 kg)	Dec 10, 2023
Jahide Lesaine Jr. TE	Recruit ratings: Rivals: 247Sports: ESPN:				
Noah Rosahac; OT	Jim Thorpe, PA	Jim Thorpe Area	6 ft 5 in (1.96 m)	280 lb (130 kg)	Apr 10, 2023
Noah Rosahac; OT	Recruit ratings: Rivals: 247Sports: ESPN:				
Braheem Long; CB	Camden, NJ	Camden	5 ft 11 in (1.80 m)	160 lb (73 kg)	Jun 20, 2023
Braheem Long; CB	Recruit ratings: Rivals: 247Sports: ESPN:				
Jamie Tremble; TE	Norcross, GA	Wesleyan School	6 ft 3 in (1.91 m)	195 lb (88 kg)	Jun 17, 2023
Jamie Tremble; TE	Recruit ratings: Rivals: 247Sports: ESPN:				
Emanuel Ross; WR	Red Bank, NJ	Red Bank Catholic	6 ft 1.5 in (1.87 m)	195 lb (88 kg)	Dec 13, 2023
Emanuel Ross; WR	Recruit ratings: Rivals: 247Sports: ESPN:				
Jaylan Hornsby; WR	Camden, NJ	Winslow Twp	6 ft 1.5 in (1.87 m)	200 lb (91 kg)	Dec 10, 2023
Jaylan Hornsby; WR	Recruit ratings: Rivals: 247Sports: ESPN:				
Jakhari Williams; QB	Macon, GA	First Presbyterian Day School	6 ft 1.5 in (1.87 m)	185 lb (84 kg)	Jun 25, 2023
Jakhari Williams; QB	Recruit ratings: Rivals: 247Sports: ESPN:				
Elijah Washington; TE	Norfolk, VA	Lake Taylor	6 ft 5.5 in (1.97 m)	205 lb (93 kg)	Aug 9, 2023
Elijah Washington; TE	Recruit ratings: Rivals: 247Sports: ESPN:				
Malachi James; ATH	Burlington, NJ	Burlington City	5 ft 11 in (1.80 m)	190 lb (86 kg)	Feb 7, 2024
Malachi James; ATH	Recruit ratings: 247Sports: ESPN:				
Ibn McDaniels; CB	Elizabeth, NJ	Elizabeth	6 ft 2.5 in (1.89 m)	183 lb (83 kg)	Jan 13, 2024
Ibn McDaniels; CB	Recruit ratings: Rivals: 247Sports: ESPN:				
Ja'Meer Thomas; WR	Buffalo, NY	Bennett	5 ft 10 in (1.78 m)	165 lb (75 kg)	Sep 21, 2023
Ja'Meer Thomas; WR	Recruit ratings: Rivals: 247Sports: ESPN:				
Jayden Brown; LB	Ramsey, NJ	Don Bosco Prep	6 ft 3 in (1.91 m)	215 lb (98 kg)	Jun 23, 2023
Jayden Brown; LB	Recruit ratings: Rivals: 247Sports: ESPN:				
Willie Goodacre; IOL	Denton, TX	Guyer	6 ft 5 in (1.96 m)	280 lb (130 kg)	Jun 26, 2023
Willie Goodacre; IOL	Recruit ratings: Rivals: 247Sports: ESPN:				
Fatim Diggs; LB	Camden, NJ	Eastside High School	6 ft 2 in (1.88 m)	215 lb (98 kg)	Dec 18, 2023
Fatim Diggs; LB	Recruit ratings: Rivals: 247Sports: ESPN:				
Travis Brown-Miller; OL	Teaneck, NJ	Teaneck	6 ft 5 in (1.96 m)	300 lb (140 kg)	Mar 7, 2024
Travis Brown-Miller; OL	Recruit ratings: No ratings found				
Xavier Miles; IOL	Jersey City, NJ	St. Peters Prep	6 ft 3 in (1.91 m)	300 lb (140 kg)	Feb 19, 2024
Xavier Miles; IOL	Recruit ratings: Rivals: 247Sports: ESPN:				
Vito Shevchenko; OT	Clearwater, FL	Clearwater Academy International	6 ft 7 in (2.01 m)	290 lb (130 kg)	Apr 24, 2024
Vito Shevchenko; OT	Recruit ratings: 247Sports: ESPN:				
Overall recruit ranking: Rivals: 36 247Sports: 37
Note: In many cases, Scout, Rivals, 247Sports, On3, and ESPN may conflict in their listings of height and weight.; In these cases, the average was taken. ESPN grades are on a 100-point scale.; Sources: "Rivals commits". Rivals.; "ESPN commits". ESPN.; "2024 Team Ranking". Rivals.com.; "247Sports commits". 247Sports.

2024 Overall class rankings

Website	National rank	Conference rank	5 star recruits	4 star recruits	3 star recruits
ESPN	--	--	0	4	16
On3 Recruits	37	9	0	3	19
Rivals	36	7	0	4	16
247 Sports	37	6	0	4	17

=== Transfers ===
Syracuse had 29 departures with an average 247Sports rating of 85, and welcomed 23 transfer players with an average rating of 87.17. This net rating gain of +2.17 tied for fifth best in the ACC.

==== Players arriving ====
Syracuse incoming transfers
Name	Number	Pos.	Height	Weight	Year	Hometown	Previous team	Source(s)
Duce Chestnut	0	DB	6-0	205	(redshirt) Junior	Camden, NJ	LSU	
Justus Ross-Simmons	2	WR	6-3	205	Junior	Rochester, NY	Colorado State	
Clarence Lewis	3	DB	6-0	201	Senior	Edison, NJ	Notre Dame	
Dion Wilson Jr.	4	DL	6-5	300	(redshirt) Senior	Perris, CA	New Mexico State	
Kyle McCord	6	QB	6-3	215	Senior	Mount Laurel, NJ	Ohio State	
James Heard	6	LB	6-2	230	(redshirt) Freshman	Camden, NJ	West Virginia	
Jackson Meeks	7	WR	6-2	205	Senior	Phenix City, AL	Georgia	
Zeed Haynes	8	WR	6-1	170	(redshirt) Freshman	Philadelphia, PA	Georgia	
Isaiah Hastings	9	DL	6-4	290	(redshirt) Sophomore	Toronto, Canada	Alabama	
Michael Johnson Jr.	9	QB	6-3	213	(redshirt) Senior	San Jose, CA	Florida Atlantic	
Fadil Diggs	10	DL	6-5	260	Senior	East Camden, NJ	Texas A&M	
Devin Grant	23	DB	6-4	190	Junior	Elmont, NY	Buffalo	
Will Nixon	24	RB	5-11	202	(redshirt) Junior	Waco, TX	Washington	
Marcus Washington Jr.	31	CB	6-1	189	(redshirt) Sophomore	Grovetown, GA	Louisville	
Codie Hornsby	54	OL	6-3	322	(redshirt) Junior	Dallas, TX	Grambling	
Da'Metrius Weatherspoon	57	OL	6-7	335	(redshirt) Junior	Clairton, PA	Howard	
Joshua Miller	72	OL	6-4	300	(redshirt) Freshman	Chesterfield, VA	Georgia	
Savion Washington	77	OL	6-8	340	(redshirt) Junior	Akron, OH	Colorado	
Jacob Zuhr	90	LS	6-0	220	(redshirt) Junior	Oviedo, FL	Wake Forest	

==== Players leaving ====
Syracuse players leaving
Name	Number	Pos.	Height	Weight	Year	Hometown	College transferred to	Source(s)
Kevon Darton	0	DL	5-11	271	Redshirt Junior	Fitchburg, MA	Arizona	
Damien Alford	5	WR	6-6	210	Junior	Montreal, Canada	Utah	
Jakobie Seabourn	5	DB	6-1	208	Junior	Houston, TX	Northern Arizona	
Stefon Thompson	7	LB	6-1	248	Redshirt Sophomore	Charlotte, NC	Nebraska	
Leon Lowery	9	LB	6-4	239	Redshirt Sophomore	Elizabeth, NJ	Wisconsin	
Mekhi Mason	13	LB	6-2	228	Sophomore	Pembroke Pines, FL	Louisiana Tech	
Jeremiah Wilson	14	DB	5-10	179	Sophomore	Kissimmee, FL	Houston	
Luke MacPhail	18	QB	6-4	212	Redshirt Sophomore	Boston, MA	Utah Tech	
Myles Farmer	20	DB	6-3	200	Redshirt Junior	Atlanta, GA	App State	
Bralyn Oliver	21	DB	6-2	194	Sophomore	Anderson, SC	Florida A&M	
Muwaffaq Parkman	21	RB	5-11	180	Freshman	Newark, NJ	Robert Morris	
Deston Hawkins	22	RB	6-0	200	Sophomore	Menlo Park, CA	Nevada	
Quan Peterson	22	DB	6-1	197	Redshirt Freshman	Chester, SC	Coastal Carolina	
Ike Daniels	23	RB	5-11	188	Freshman	Stafford, VA	Towson	
Khalib Gilmore	25	LB	6-4	225	Redshirt Junior	Melbourne, FL	Ball State	
Aman Greenwood	26	DB	5-10	197	Redshirt Junior	Washington, DC	Akron	
Malcolm Folk	27	DB	6-1	192	Redshirt Sophomore	Pottsgrove, PA	Kent State	
Juwaun Price	28	RB	5-10	208	Redshirt Junior	Phoenix, AZ	North Texas	
Josiah Jeffery	38	LB	6-1	220	Freshman	Greenwood, SC	Anderson (South Carolina)	
Jayden Bass	69	OL	6-6	310	Redshirt Freshman	Springfield, MA	Connecticut	
Wes Hoeh	73	OL	6-4	283	Redshirt Sophomore	Glen Ellyn, IL	Connecticut	
Joe More	77	OL	6-5	309	Redshirt Senior	Franklin, TN	Arkansas	
Isaiah Jones	80	WR	6-4	200	Redshirt Junior	Cocoa, Florida	New Mexico	
Bryce Cohoon	83	WR	6-2	187	Freshman	Wichita, KS	Kansas	
Donovan Brown	87	WR	6–1	178	Redshirt Freshman	Montgomery Village, MD	Lackawanna College	
Steven Mahar Jr.	88	TE	6-5	240	Junior	Rochester, NY	Duquesne	
Terry Lockett	90	DL	6-3	280	Redshirt Sophomore	Springfield, MA	James Madison	
Jalil Smith	91	DL	6-5	266	Freshman	Brooklyn, NY	Warner	
Ty Gordon	93	DL	6-1	273	Freshman	Gainesville, VA	William & Mary	
Francois Nolton Jr.	95	DL	6-4	252	Freshman	Miami, FL		

== Schedule ==
Date	Time	Opponent	Rank	Site	TV	Result	Attendance
August 31	3:30 p.m.	Ohio*		JMA Wireless Dome; Syracuse, NY	ACCN	W 38–22	37,225
September 7	12:00 p.m.	No. 23 Georgia Tech		JMA Wireless Dome; Syracuse, NY	ACCN	W 31–28	39,550
September 20	7:30 p.m.	Stanford		JMA Wireless Dome; Syracuse, NY	ESPN	L 24–26	39,290
September 28	12:00 p.m.	Holy Cross*		JMA Wireless Dome; Syracuse, NY	ACCNX/ESPN+	W 42–14	43,455
October 4	9:00 p.m.	at No. 25 UNLV*		Allegiant Stadium; Paradise, NV	FS1	W 44–41 ^{OT}	31,329
October 12	8:00 p.m.	at NC State		Carter–Finley Stadium; Raleigh, NC	ACCN	W 24–17	56,919
October 24	7:30 p.m.	at No. 19 Pittsburgh		Acrisure Stadium; Pittsburgh, PA (rivalry)	ESPN	L 13–41	47,266
November 2	12:00 p.m.	Virginia Tech		JMA Wireless Dome; Syracuse, NY	The CW	W 38–31 ^{OT}	38,454
November 9	12:00 p.m.	at Boston College		Alumni Stadium; Chestnut Hill, MA	The CW	L 31–37	44,500
November 16	3:00 p.m.	at California		California Memorial Stadium; Berkeley, CA	The CW	W 33–25	33,493
November 23	12:00 p.m.	UConn*		JMA Wireless Dome; Syracuse, NY (rivalry)	ACCN	W 31–24	35,453
November 30	3:30 p.m.	No. 6 Miami (FL)		JMA Wireless Dome; Syracuse, NY	ESPN	W 42–38	40,486
December 27	8:00 p.m.	vs. Washington State*	No. 21	Snapdragon Stadium; San Diego, CA (Holiday Bowl)	FOX	W 52–35	23,920
*Non-conference game; Rankings from AP Poll - Released prior to game; All times are in Eastern time; Source:

== Game summaries ==
=== Ohio ===
Ohio Bobcats at Syracuse Orange – Game summary

Quarter	1	2	3	4	Total
Bobcats	6	3	7	6	22
Orange	0	17	14	7	38

at JMA Wireless Dome, Syracuse, New York

- Date: August 31
- Game time: 3:30 p.m. EDT
- Game weather: None (played indoors)
- Game attendance: 37,225
- Referee: Jeff Heaser
- TV announcers (ACCN): Chris Cotter, Mark Herzlich, and Coley Harvey
- Box score, Recap

Game information

First quarter

- OHIO – Gianni Spetic 35-yard field goal, 8:33. Bobcats 3–0. Drive: 13 plays, 50 yards, 6:27.
- OHIO – Gianni Spetic 37-yard field goal, 0:11. Bobcats 6–0. Drive: 12 plays, 54 yards, 7:24.

Second quarter

- SYR – Oronde Gadsden II 28-yard pass from Kyle McCord (Brady Denaburg kick), 12:28. Orange 7–6. Drive: 8 plays, 75 yards, 2:43.
- SYR – Brady Denaburg 26-yard field goal, 2:02. Orange 10–6. Drive: 17 plays, 73 yards, 7:01.
- OHIO – Gianni Spetic 20-yard field goal, 0:49. Orange 10–9. Drive: 7 plays, 72 yards, 1:13.
- SYR – Trebor Pena 20-yard pass from Kyle McCord (Brady Denaburg kick), 0:05. Orange 17–9. Drive: 8 plays, 75 yards, 0:44.

Third quarter

- OHIO – Anthony Tyus III 13-yard run (Gianni Spetic kick), 11:44. Orange 17–16. Drive: 5 plays, 75 yards, 2:22.
- SYR – LeQuint Allen 5-yard pass from Kyle McCord (Brady Denaburg kick), 6:37. Orange 24–16. Drive: 9 plays, 75 yards, 5:07.
- SYR – Trebor Pena 14-yard pass from Kyle McCord (Brady Denaburg kick), 3:34. Orange 31–16. Drive: 5 plays, 67 yards, 1:57.

Fourth quarter

- SYR – Trebor Pena 1-yard run (Brady Denaburg kick), 13:30. Orange 38–16. Drive: 8 plays, 68 yards, 3:16.
- OHIO – Anthony Tyus III 46-yard run (run failed), 12:22. Orange 38–22. Drive: 4 plays, 75 yards, 1:08.

Statistics	OHIO	SYR
First downs	26	25
Total yards	436	480
Rushing yards	255	126
Passing yards	181	354
Turnovers	1	1
Time of possession	31:28	28:32

Team	Category	Player	Statistics
Ohio	Passing	Parker Navarro	18/30, 181 yards, INT
Ohio	Rushing	Anthony Tyus III	16 rushes, 203 yards, 2 TD
Ohio	Receiving	Coleman Owen	10 receptions, 137 yards
Syracuse	Passing	Kyle McCord	27/39, 354 yards, 4 TD, INT
Syracuse	Rushing	LeQuint Allen	15 rushes, 98 yards
Syracuse	Receiving	Oronde Gadsden II	15 receptions, 98 yards

=== Georgia Tech ===
No. 23 Georgia Tech Yellow Jackets at Syracuse Orange – Game summary

Quarter	1	2	3	4	Total
No. 23 Yellow Jackets	7	7	0	14	28
Orange	7	14	3	7	31

at JMA Wireless Dome, Syracuse, New York

- Date: September 7
- Game time: 12:00 p.m. EDT
- Game weather: None (played indoors)
- Game attendance: 39,550
- Referee: Mike Roche
- TV announcers (ACCN): Chris Cotter, Mark Herzlich, and Coley Harvey
- Box score, Recap

Game information

First quarter

- (12:21) SYR – Trebor Pena 11-yard pass from Kyle McCord, Brady Denaburg kick (Drive: 7 plays, 75 yards, 2:39; Syracuse 7-0)
- (7:52) GT – Haynes King 21-yard run, Aidan Birr kick (Drive: 10 plays, 75 yards, 4:29; Tied 7-7)

Second quarter

- (12:27) SYR – Trebor Pena 11-yard pass from Kyle McCord, Brady Denaburg kick (Drive: 7 plays, 70 yards, 3:18; Syracuse 14-7)
- (6:19) SYR – Oronde Gadsden II 20-yard pass from Kyle McCord, Brady Denaburg kick (Drive: 9 plays, 89 yards, 4:18; Syracuse 21-7)
- (4:39) GT – Haynes King 26-yard run, Aidan Birr kick (Drive: 4 plays, 75 yards, 1:40; Syracuse 21-14)

Third quarter

- (6:51) SYR – Brady Denaburg 33-yard field goal (Drive: 15 plays, 65 yards, 6:55; Syracuse 24-14)

Fourth quarter

- (8:39) SYR – Oronde Gadsden II 17-yard pass from Kyle McCord, Brady Denaburg kick (Drive: 7 plays, 32 yards, 4:01; Syracuse 31-14)
- (5:08) GT – Chase Lane 4-yard pass from Haynes King, Aidan Birr kick (Drive: 12 plays, 75 yards, 3:31; Syracuse 31-21)
- (2:31) GT – Jamal Haynes 15-yard run, Aidan Birr kick (Drive: 9 plays, 56 yards, 2:35; Syracuse 31-28)

Statistics	GT	SYR
First downs	19	27
Total yards	378	515
Rushing yards	112	134
Passing yards	266	381
Turnovers	0	0
Time of possession	23:06	36:54

Team	Category	Player	Statistics
Georgia Tech	Passing	Haynes King	29/39, 266 yards, TD
Georgia Tech	Rushing	Haynes King	6 rushes, 67 yards, 2 TD
Georgia Tech	Receiving	Eric Singleton Jr.	5 receptions, 86 yards
Syracuse	Passing	Kyle McCord	32/46, 381 yards, 4 TD
Syracuse	Rushing	LeQuint Allen	15 rushes, 83 yards
Syracuse	Receiving	Oronde Gadsden II	6 receptions, 93 yards, 2 TD

=== Stanford ===
Stanford Cardinal at Syracuse Orange − Game summary

Quarter	1	2	3	4	Total
Cardinal	7	6	7	6	26
Orange	0	10	7	7	24

at JMA Wireless Dome, Syracuse, New York

- Date: September 20
- Game time: 7:30 p.m. EDT
- Game weather: None (played indoors)
- Game attendance: 39,290
- Referee: Tim Hedgepeth
- TV announcers (ESPN): Anish Shroff, Andre Ware, and Paul Carcaterra
- Box score, Recap

Game information

First quarter

- (7:22) STAN – Elic Ayomanor 17-yard pass from Ashton Daniels, Emmet Kenney kick (Drive: 9 plays, 78 yards, 4:07; Stanford 7-0)

Second quarter

- (14:03) STAN – Emmet Kenney 38-yard field goal (Drive: 11 plays, 51 yards, 5:39; Stanford 10-0)
- (9:26) SYR – Brady Denaburg 30-yard field goal (Drive: 5 plays, 11 yards, 1:37; Stanford 10-3)
- (1:35) STAN – Emmet Kenney 51-yard field goal (Drive: 5 plays, 47 yards, 1:00; Stanford 13-3)
- (0:28) SYR – Umari Hatcher 67-yard pass from Kyle McCord, Brady Denaburg kick (Drive: 3 plays, 75 yards, 1:07; Stanford 13-10)

Third quarter

- (4:16) STAN – Mitch Leigber 71-yard interception, Emmet Kenney kick (Stanford 20-10)
- (0:07) SYR – Kyle McCord 19-yard run, Brady Denaburg kick (Drive: 9 plays, 75 yards, 4:09; Stanford 20-17)

Fourth quarter

- (9:19) STAN – Emmet Kenney 35-yard field goal (Drive: 9 plays, 30 yards, 4:39; Stanford 23-17)
- (3:13) SYR – Jackson Meeks 13-yard pass from Kyle McCord, Brady Denaburg kick (Drive: 7 plays, 60 yards, 3:27; Syracuse 24-23)
- (0:00) STAN – Emmet Kenney 39-yard field goal (Drive: 11 plays, 54 yards, 3:13; Stanford 26-24)

Statistics	STAN	SYR
First downs	21	18
Total yards	351	365
Rushing yards	173	26
Passing yards	178	339
Turnovers	2	2
Time of possession	31:40	27:16

Team	Category	Player	Statistics
Stanford	Passing	Ashton Daniels	23/38, 178 yards, TD, 2 INT
Stanford	Rushing	Chris Davis Jr.	9 carries, 79 yards
Stanford	Receiving	Elic Ayomanor	7 receptions, 87 yards, TD
Syracuse	Passing	Kyle McCord	27/42, 339 yards, 2 TD, 2 INT
Syracuse	Rushing	LeQuint Allen	8 carries, 25 yards
Syracuse	Receiving	Trebor Pena	10 receptions, 101 yards

=== Holy Cross (FCS) ===
Holy Cross Crusaders (FCS) at Syracuse Orange – Game summary

Quarter	1	2	3	4	Total
Crusaders (FCS)	0	14	0	0	14
Orange	14	14	7	7	42

at JMA Wireless Dome, Syracuse, New York

- Date: September 28
- Game time: 12:00 p.m. EDT
- Game weather: None (played indoors)
- Game attendance: 43,455
- Referee: Stuart Mullins
- TV announcers (ACCNX/ESPN+): Noah Reed and Craig Haubert
- Box score, Recap

Statistics	HC	SYR
First downs	8	32
Total yards	203	541
Rushing yards	9	125
Passing yards	194	416
Turnovers	1	2
Time of possession	25:58	34:02

Team	Category	Player	Statistics
Holy Cross	Passing	Joe Pesansky	14/25, 167 yards, TD, INT
Holy Cross	Rushing	Jayden Clerveaux	10 rushes, 10 yards
Holy Cross	Receiving	Max Mosey	5 receptions, 105 yards, TD
Syracuse	Passing	Kyle McCord	28/50, 385 yards, 4 TD, 2 INT
Syracuse	Rushing	LeQuint Allen	16 rushes, 81 yards, TD
Syracuse	Receiving	Jackson Meeks	10 receptions, 161 yards, TD

=== at No. 25 UNLV ===
Syracuse Orange at No. 25 UNLV Rebels – Game summary

Quarter	1	2	3	4	OT	Total
Orange	14	3	14	7	6	44
No. 25 Rebels	0	21	10	7	3	41

at Allegiant Stadium, Paradise, Nevada

- Date: October 4
- Game time: 9:00 p.m. EDT/6:00 p.m. PDT
- Game weather: None (played indoors)
- Game attendance: 31,329
- Referee: Adam Savoie
- TV announcers (FS1): Trent Rush and Petros Papadakis
- Box score, Recap

Game information
First quarter
- SYR – LeQuint Allen 9-yard pass from Kyle McCord (Jayden Oh kick), 8:43. Orange 7–0. Drive: 9 plays, 75 yards, 5:22.
- SYR – LeQuint Allen 3-yard run (Jayden Oh kick), 0:44. Orange 14–0. Drive: 9 plays, 87 yards, 4:30.

Second quarter

- UNLV – Kaleo Ballungay 6-yard pass from Hajj-Malik Williams (Caden Chittenden kick), 12:17. Orange 14–7. Drive: 8 plays, 75 yards, 3:27.
- UNLV – Hajj-Malik Williams 3-yard run (Caden Chittenden kick), 8:30. Tied 14–14. Drive: 2 plays, 56 yards, 0:30.
- UNLV – Casey Cain 9-yard pass from Hajj-Malik Williams (Caden Chittenden kick), 5:57. Rebels 21–14. Drive: 2 plays, 9 yards, 0:42.
- SYR – Jayden Oh 21-yard field goal, 0:07. Rebels 21–17. Drive: 16 plays, 72 yards, 5:50.

Third quarter

- SYR – LeQuint Allen 6-yard pass from Kyle McCord (Jayden Oh kick), 9:12. Orange 24–21. Drive: 12 plays, 75 yards, 5:48.
- SYR – Yasin Willis 21-yard run (Jayden Oh kick), 8:36. Orange 31–21. Drive: 1 play, 21 yards, 0:06.
- UNLV – Caden Chittenden 20-yard field goal, 3:24. Orange 31–24. Drive: 11 plays, 73 yards, 5:12.
- UNLV – Charles Correa 0-yard blocked punt return (Caden Chittenden kick), 0:28. Tied 31–31.

Fourth quarter

- UNLV – Ricky White III 9-yard pass from Hajj-Malik Williams (Caden Chittenden kick), 2:58. Rebels 38–31. Drive: 10 plays, 94 yards, 5:07.
- SYR – Jackson Meeks 6-yard pass from Kyle McCord (Jayden Oh kick), 0:23. Tied 38–38. Drive: 11 plays, 75 yards, 2:35.

Overtime

- UNLV – Caden Chittenden 41-yard field goal. Rebels 41–38. Drive: 4 plays, 3 yards, 0:00.
- SYR – LeQuint Allen 1-yard run. Orange 44–41. Drive: 8 plays, 25 yards, 0:00.

Statistics	SYR	UNLV
First downs	34	20
Total yards	492	354
Rushing yards	137	127
Passing yards	355	227
Turnovers	1	1
Time of possession	39:38	20:22

Team	Category	Player	Statistics
Syracuse	Passing	Kyle McCord	40/63, 355 yards, 3 TD, INT
Syracuse	Rushing	LeQuint Allen	19 rushes, 71 yards, 2 TD
Syracuse	Receiving	Oronde Gadsden II	10 receptions, 142 yards
UNLV	Passing	Hajj-Malik Williams	21/25, 227 yards, 3 TD, INT
UNLV	Rushing	Jai'Den Thomas	6 rushes, 64 yards
UNLV	Receiving	Ricky White III	10 receptions, 135 yards, TD

=== at NC State ===
Syracuse Orange at NC State Wolfpack – Game summary

Quarter	1	2	3	4	Total
Orange	3	7	7	7	24
Wolfpack	0	7	0	10	17

at Carter–Finley Stadium, Raleigh, North Carolina

- Date: October 12
- Game time: 8:00 p.m. EDT
- Game weather: Clear, 64 °F (18 °C)
- Game attendance: 56,919
- Referee: Riley Johnson
- TV announcers (ACCN): Wes Durham, Tom Luginbill, and Dana Boyle
- Box score, Recap

Game information
First quarter
- SYR – Jadyn Oh 32-yard field goal, 8:13. Orange 3–0. Drive: 16 plays, 61 yards, 6:47.

Second quarter

- SYR – Umari Hatcher 28-yard pass from Kyle McCord (Jadyn Oh kick), 2:33. Orange 10–0. Drive: 7 plays, 83 yards, 2:45.
- NCSU – Justin Joly 14-yard pass from CJ Bailey (Kanoah Vinesett kick), 0:31. Orange 10–7. Drive: 7 plays, 75 yards, 2:02.

Third quarter

- SYR – LeQuint Allen 4-yard run (Jadyn Oh kick), 6:39. Orange 17–7. Drive: 8 plays, 73 yards, 3:27.

Fourth quarter

- SYR – Jackson Meeks 2-yard pass from Kyle McCord (Jadyn Oh kick), 10:20. Orange 24–7. Drive: 8 plays, 38 yards, 6:04.
- NCSU – Noah Rogers 75-yard pass from CJ Bailey (Kanoah Vinesett kick), 9:31. Orange 24–14. Drive: 2 plays, 75 yards, 0:49.
- NCSU – Kanoah Vinesett 29-yard field goal, 1:32. Orange 24–17. Drive: 6 plays, 81 yards, 1:40.

Statistics	SYR	NCST
First downs	25	18
Total yards	424	411
Rushing yards	78	82
Passing yards	346	329
Turnovers	0	3
Time of possession	36:52	23:08

Team	Category	Player	Statistics
Syracuse	Passing	Kyle McCord	31/42, 346 yards, 2 TD
Syracuse	Rushing	LeQuint Allen	21 rushes, 91 yards, TD
Syracuse	Receiving	Jackson Meeks	11 receptions, 116 yards, TD
NC State	Passing	CJ Bailey	17/24, 329 yards, 2 TD, INT
NC State	Rushing	CJ Bailey	7 rushes, 28 yards
NC State	Receiving	Noah Rogers	4 receptions, 95 yards, TD

=== at No. 19 Pittsburgh (rivalry) ===
Syracuse Orange at No. 19 Pittsburgh Panthers – Game summary

Quarter	1	2	3	4	Total
Orange	0	0	6	7	13
No. 19 Panthers	17	14	0	10	41

at Acrisure Stadium, Pittsburgh, Pennsylvania

- Date: October 24
- Game time: 7:30 p.m. EDT
- Game weather: Sunny, 55 °F (13 °C)
- Game attendance: 47,266
- Referee: Tim Hedfepeth
- TV announcers (ESPN): Matt Barrie, Dan Mullen, and Harry Lyles Jr.
- Box score, Recap

Game information
First quarter
- PITT – Rasheem Biles 35-yard interception return (Ben Sauls kick), 12:47. Panthers 7–0.
- PITT – Ben Sauls 49-yard field goal, 8:28. Panthers 10–0. Drive: 6 plays, 13 yards, 2:14.
- PITT – Kyle Louis 59-yard interception return (Ben Sauls kick), 6:23. Panthers 17–0.

Second quarter

- PITT – Censere Lee 20-yard pass from Eli Holstein (Ben Sauls kick), 12:30. Panthers 24–0. Drive: 7 plays, 65 yards, 2:21.
- PITT – Braylan Lovelace 33-yard interception return (Ben Sauks kick), 1:12. Panthers 31–0.

Third quarter

- SYR – Kyle McCord 1-yard run (pass failed), 5:22. Panthers 31–6. Drive: 18 plays, 73 yards, 9:38.

Fourth quarter

- PITT – Raphael Williams Jr. 29-yard pass from Eli Holstein (Ben Sauls kick), 14:54. Panthers 38–6. Drive: 3 plays, 45 yards, 0:52.
- PITT – Ben Sauls 57-yard field goal, 11:13. Panthers 41–6. Drive: 6 plays, 29 yards, 2:37.
- SYR – Dan Villari 2-yard run (Jadyn Oh kick), 7:23. Panthers 41–13. Drive: 11 plays, 75 yards, 3:50.

Statistics	SYR	PITT
First downs	23	13
Total yards	327	217
Rushing yards	6	73
Passing yards	321	144
Turnovers	5	0
Time of possession	41:12	18:48

Team	Category	Player	Statistics
Syracuse	Passing	Kyle McCord	35/64, 321 yards, 5 INT
Syracuse	Rushing	LeQuint Allen	15 rushes, 32 yards
Syracuse	Receiving	Emanuel Ross	5 receptions, 78 yards
Pittsburgh	Passing	Eli Holstein	11/15, 108 yards, 2 TD
Pittsburgh	Rushing	Desmond Reid	11 rushes, 47 yards
Pittsburgh	Receiving	Raphael Williams Jr.	2 receptions, 31 yards, TD

=== Virginia Tech ===
Virginia Tech Hokies at Syracuse Orange – Game summary

Quarter	1	2	3	4	OT	Total
Hokies	14	0	7	10	0	31
Orange	0	3	15	13	7	38

at JMA Wireless Dome • Syracuse, NY

- Date: November 2
- Game time: 12:00 p.m. EDT
- Game weather: None (played indoors)
- Game attendance: 38,454
- Referee: Marcus Woods
- TV announcers (The CW): Thom Brennaman (play-by-play) and Max Browne (analyst)

Game information

First quarter

- (8:45) VT – Jaylin Lane 7-yard run, John Love kick (Drive: 7 plays, 80 yards, 3:43; Virginia Tech 7–0)
- (4:31) VT – Collin Schlee 1-yard run, John Love kick (Drive: 7 plays, 73 yards, 3:19; Virginia Tech 14–0)

Second quarter

- (14:56) SYR – Jackson Kennedy 44-yard field goal (Drive: 11 plays, 66 yards, 4:30; Virginia Tech 14–7)

Third quarter

- (7:44) VT – Ali Jennings 12-yard pass from Collin Schlee, John Love kick (Drive: 10 plays, 76 yards, 5:38; Virginia Tech 21–7)
- (6:08) SYR – Kyle McCord 55-yard pass from Kyle McCord, Jackson Kennedy kick (Drive: 4 plays, 75 yards, 1:36; Virginia Tech 21–10)
- (2:53) SYR – LeQuint Allen 1-yard run, Kyle McCord pass (Drive: 6 plays, 56 yards, 2:34; Virginia Tech 21–18)

Fourth quarter

- (14:22) SYR – Justus Ross-Simmons 28-yard pass from Kyle McCord (Drive: 5 plays, 39 yards, 1:23; Syracuse 24–21)
- (11:04) VT – Malachi Thomas 15-yard run, John Love kick (Drive: 8 plays, 75 yards, 3:18; Virginia Tech 28–24)
- (5:16) VT – John Love 27-yard field goal (Drive: 8 plays, 28 yards, 4:16; Virginia Tech 31–24)
- (0:29) SYR – LeQuint Allen 1-yard run, Jackson Kennedy kick (Drive: 14 plays, 75 yards, 4:47; Tied 31–31)

Overtime

- (0:00) SYR – LeQuint Allen 1-yard run, Jackson Kennedy kick (Drive: 2 plays, 25 yards, 0:00; Syracuse 38–31)

Statistics	VT	SYR
First downs	24	23
Total yards	455	410
Rushing yards	249	130
Passing yards	206	280
Passing: Comp–Att–Int	16–24–0	24–36–1
Time of possession	34:18	25:42

Team	Category	Player	Statistics
Virginia Tech	Passing	Collin Schlee	16/24, 206 yards, 1 TD
Virginia Tech	Rushing	Jeremiah Coney	9 carries, 96 yards
Virginia Tech	Receiving	Stephen Gosnell	5 receptions, 118 yards
Syracuse	Passing	Kyle McCord	24/35, 280 yards, 2 TD, INT
Syracuse	Rushing	LeQuint Allen	21 carries, 121 yards, 3 TD
Syracuse	Receiving	Justus Ross-Simmons	4 receptions, 88 yards, 2 TD

=== at Boston College ===
Syracuse Orange at Boston College Eagles – Game summary

Quarter	1	2	3	4	Total
Orange	0	14	7	10	31
Eagles	7	7	16	7	37

at Alumni Stadium • Chestnut Hill, MA

- Date: November 9
- Game time: 12:00 p.m. EDT
- Game weather: Sunny, 49 °F (9 °C)
- Game attendance: 44,500
- Referee: Stuart Mullins
- TV announcers (The CW): Thom Brennaman (play-by-play) and Max Browne (analyst)
- Box score, Recap

Game information

First quarter

- (2:43) BC – Kye Robichaux 34-yard run, Liam Connor kick (Drive: 3 plays, 42 yards, 1:24; Boston College 7–0)

Second quarter

- (8:44) BC – Lewis Bond 9-yard pass from Thomas Castellanos, Liam Connor kick (Drive: 6 plays, 53 yards, 3:02; Boston College 14–0)
- (6:32) SYR – Oronde Gadsden II 17-yard pass from Kyle McCord, Jackson Kennedy kick (Drive: 6 plays, 88 yards, 2:23; Boston College 14–7)
- (2:10) SYR – LeQuint Allen 3-yard run, Jackson Kennedy kick (Drive: 6 plays, 67 yards, 2:45; Tied 14–14)

Third quarter

- (8:36) SYR – LeQuint Allen 4-yard run, Jackson Kennedy kick (Drive: 8 plays, 59 yards, 4:17; Syracuse 21–14)
- (7:47) BC – Kye Robichaux 14-yard run, Liam Connor kick (Drive: 3 plays, 75 yards, 0:49; Tied 21–21)
- (7:33) BC – 0-yard safety (Boston College 23–21)
- (0:38) BC – Jordan McDonald 13-yard run, Liam Connor kick (Drive: 12 plays, 67 yards, 6:55; Boston College 30–21)

Fourth quarter

- (11:16) SYR – Darrell Gill Jr. 12-yard pass from Kyle McCord, Jackson Kennedy kick (Drive: 10 plays, 75 yards, 4:22; Boston College 30–28)
- (6:51) BC – Jeremiah Franklin 18-yard pass from Grayson James, Liam Connor kick (Drive: 10 plays, 78 yards, 4:25; Boston College 37–28)
- (1:16) SYR – Jackson Kennedy 25-yard field goal (Drive: 9 plays, 73 yards, 2:26; Boston College 37–31)

Statistics	SYR	BC
First downs	26	22
Total yards	431	378
Rushing yards	39	313
Passing yards	392	65
Passing: Comp–Att–Int	31-48-0	7-13-1
Time of possession	29:17	30:43

Team	Category	Player	Statistics
Syracuse	Passing	Kyle McCord	31/48, 392 yards, 2 TD
Syracuse	Rushing	LeQuint Allen	16 rushes, 51 yards, 2 TD
Syracuse	Receiving	Oronde Gadsden II	9 receptions, 114 yards, TD
Boston College	Passing	Grayson James	5/6, 51 yards, TD
Boston College	Rushing	Kye Robichaux	28 rushes, 198 yards, 2 TD
Boston College	Receiving	Lewis Bond	5 receptions, 42 yards, TD

=== at California ===
Syracuse Orange at California Golden Bears – Game summary

Quarter	1	2	3	4	Total
Orange	6	21	3	3	33
Golden Bears	0	7	7	11	25

at California Memorial Stadium • Berkeley, CA

- Date: November 16
- Game time: 3:00 p.m. EDT
- Game attendance: 33,493
- TV announcers (The CW): Thom Brennaman (play-by-play), Max Browne (analyst) and Treavor Scales (sideline)

Game information

First quarter
Second quarter
Third quarter
Fourth quarter

Statistics	SYR	CAL
First downs	26	19
Total yards	471	391
Rushing yards	148	166
Passing yards	323	225
Passing: Comp–Att–Int	29-46-0	22-34-2
Time of possession	38:41	21:19

Team	Category	Player	Statistics
Syracuse	Passing	Kyle McCord	29-46 323 Yards 1 TD
Syracuse	Rushing	LeQuint Allen	23 Carries 109 Yards 2 TD
Syracuse	Receiving	Oronde Gadsden II	8 Receptions 109 Yards
California	Passing	Fernando Mendoza	22-34 225 Yards 1 TD 2 INT
California	Rushing	Jaivian Thomas	3 Carries 80 Yards 1 TD
California	Receiving	Jonathan Brady	6 Receptions 54 Yards 1 TD

=== UConn (rivalry) ===
UConn Huskies at Syracuse Orange – Game summary

Quarter	1	2	3	4	Total
Huskies	7	7	3	7	24
Orange	7	14	3	7	31

at JMA Wireless Dome • Syracuse, NY

- Date: November 23
- Game time: 12:00 p.m. EDT
- Game weather: Indoor
- Game attendance: 35,453
- Referee: Riley Johnson
- TV announcers (ACCN): Chris Cotter (play-by-play), Mark Herzlich (analyst) and Coley Harvey (sideline)

Game information

First quarter

- SYR - Gadsden II, Oronde 22 yd pass from McCord, Kyle (Kennedy, Jackson kick), 14:10. Orange 7–0. Drive: 2 plays, 75 yards, TOP 00:50
- CONN - Edwards, Cam 71 yd run (Freeman, Chris kick), 5:41. Tied 7–7. Drive: 4 plays, 80 yards, TOP 01:37

Second quarter

- SYR - McCord, Kyle 5 yd pass from McCord, Kyle (Kennedy, Jackson kick), 14:55. Orange 14–7. Drive: 12 plays, 77 yards, TOP 05:40
- SYR - Allen, LeQuint 1 yd run (Kennedy, Jackson kick), 3:17. Orange 21–7. Drive: 14 plays, 68 yards, TOP 06:15
- CONN - Hansen, Louis 5 yd pass from Fagnano, Joe (Freeman, Chris kick), 0:32. Orange 21–14. Drive: 10 plays, 75 yards, TOP 02:45

Third quarter

- SYR - Kennedy, Jackson 23 yd field goal, 4:35. Orange 24–14. Drive: 9 plays, 69 yards, TOP 04:00
- CONN - Freeman, Chris 42 yd field goal, 0:35. Orange 24–17. Drive: 6 plays, 10 yards, TOP 02:39

Fourth quarter

- SYR - McCord, Kyle 1 yd run (Kennedy, Jackson kick), 10:09. Orange 31–17. Drive: 10 plays, 73 yards, TOP 04:51
- CONN - Sheffield, TJ 2 yd pass from Fagnano, Joe (Freeman, Chris kick), 1:29. Orange 31–24. Drive: 15 plays, 89 yards, TOP 02:54

Statistics	CONN	SYR
First downs	16	25
Total yards	352	538
Rushing yards	124	68
Passing yards	228	470
Passing: Comp–Att–Int	2–12–0	2–14–0
Time of possession	22:34	37:26

Team	Category	Player	Statistics
UConn	Passing	Joe Fagnano	27/48, 228 yards, 2 TD
UConn	Rushing	Cam Edwards	8 carries, 87 yards, TD
UConn	Receiving	Skyler Bell	10 receptions, 113 yards
Syracuse	Passing	Kyle McCord	37/47, 470 yards, 2 TD
Syracuse	Rushing	LeQuint Allen	20 carries, 58 yards, TD
Syracuse	Receiving	Darrell Gill Jr.	9 receptions, 185 yards

=== No. 6 Miami (FL) ===
Syracuse picked up its first win over a top-10 team since 2017 (#2 Clemson). The victory snapped a six game losing streak against Miami active since 1998. The 21 point comeback was the largest in program history. This was also the first time Miami played in the JMA Wireless Dome as an ACC member. This loss knocked Miami out of the ACC Championship Game contention.

No. 6 Miami Hurricanes at Syracuse Orange – Game summary

Quarter	1	2	3	4	Total
No. 6 Hurricanes	14	7	7	10	38
Orange	0	14	21	7	42

at JMA Wireless Dome • Syracuse, NY

- Date: November 30
- Game time: 3:30 p.m. EDT
- Game weather: None (played indoors)
- Game attendance: 40,486
- Referee: Adam Savoie
- TV announcers (ESPN): Mike Monaco (play-by-play), Kirk Morrison (analyst), and Dawn Davenport (sideline reporter)

Game information

First quarter

- (10:46) MIA – Mark Fletcher Jr. 2-yard run, Andres Borregales kick (Drive: 10 plays, 75 yards, 4:14; Miami 7–0)
- (3:43) MIA – Xavier Restrepo 16-yard pass from Cam Ward, Andres Borregales kick (Drive: 7 plays, 63 yards, 3:04; Miami 14–0)

Second quarter

- (12:57) MIA – Elijah Arroyo 3-yard pass from Cam Ward, Andres Borregales kick (Drive: 8 plays, 93 yards, 3:38; Miami 21–0)
- (10:54) SYR – LeQuint Allen 8-yard run, Jackson Kennedy kick (Drive: 7 plays, 75 yards, 2:03; Miami 21–7)
- (3:41) SYR – Jackson Meeks 9-yard pass from Kyle McCord, Jackson Kennedy kick (Drive: 16 plays, 67 yards, 5:44; Miami 21–14)

Third quarter

- (14:21) SYR – Trebor Pena 9-yard pass from Kyle McCord, Jackson Kennedy kick (Drive: 3 plays, 75 yards, 0:39; Tied 21–21)
- (11:02) MIA – Mark Fletcher Jr. 2-yard run, Andres Borregales kick (Drive: 8 plays, 75 yards, 3:19; Miami 28–21)
- (7:47) SYR – Jackson Meeks 9-yard pass from Kyle McCord, Jackson Kennedy kick (Drive: 7 plays, 75 yards, 3:15; Tied 28–28)
- (1:47) SYR – Devin Grant 56-yard fumble return, Jackson Kennedy kick (Syracuse 35–28)

Fourth quarter

- (13:02) MIA – Damien Martinez 2-yard run, Andres Borregales kick (Drive: 9 plays, 75 yards, 3:45; Tied 35–35)
- (9:16) SYR – LeQuint Allen 3-yard run, Jackson Kennedy kick (Drive: 10 plays, 75 yards, 3:46; Syracuse 42–35)
- (3:42) MIA – Andres Borregales 27-yard field goal (Drive: 14 plays, 65 yards, 5:34; Syracuse 42–38)

Statistics	MIA	SYR
First downs	25	16
Total yards	503	479
Rushing yards	154	99
Passing yards	349	380
Passing: Comp–Att–Int	25–36–0	26–36–0
Time of possession	31:10	28:50

Team	Category	Player	Statistics
Miami (FL)	Passing	Cam Ward	25/36, 349 yards, 2 TD
Miami (FL)	Rushing	Damien Martinez	10 carries, 84 yards, TD
Miami (FL)	Receiving	Xavier Restrepo	9 receptions, 148 yards, TD
Syracuse	Passing	Kyle McCord	26/36, 380 yards, 3 TD
Syracuse	Rushing	LeQuint Allen	22 carries, 82 yards, 2 TD
Syracuse	Receiving	Trebor Pena	6 receptions, 128 yards, TD

=== Washington State (Holiday Bowl) ===
2024 DirecTV Holiday Bowl
No. 21 Syracuse Orange (9–3) vs Washington State Cougars (8–4) – Game summary

Quarter	1	2	3	4	Total
No. 21 Orange	14	21	7	10	52
Cougars	21	0	7	7	35

at Snapdragon Stadium • San Diego, California

- Date: Friday, December 27, 2024
- Game time: 8:00 p.m. EST
- Game weather: Cloudy • Temperature: 59 °F (15 °C) • Wind: 3 mph (4.8 km/h) southwest
- Game attendance: 23,920
- Referee: Jerry McGinn
- TV announcers (Fox): Gus Johnson (play-by-play), Joel Klatt (analyst), and Jenny Taft (sideline)

Game information

First quarter

- (9:47) WSU – Zevi Eckhaus 4-yard run, Dean Janikowski kick (Drive: 8 plays, 68 yards, 3:57; Washington State 7–0)
- (7:03) SYR – Trebor Pena 19-yard pass from Kyle McCord, 2-point run conversion failed (Drive: 6 plays, 75 yards, 2:44; Washington State 7–6)
- (2:32) SYR – LeQuint Allen 12-yard run, Kyle McCord pass to LeQuint Allen for 2-point conversion (Drive: 4 plays, 51 yards, 1:22; Washington State 14–7)
- (1:22) WSU – Kyle Williams 66-yard pass from Zevi Eckhaus, Dean Janikowski kick (Drive: 3 plays, 73 yards, 1:03; Tied 14–14)
- (0:17) WSU – Josh Meredith 12-yard punt return, Dean Janikowski kick (Drive: 3 plays, 2 yards, 1:05; Washington State 21–14)

Second quarter

- (12:53) SYR – Oronde Gadsden II 18-yard pass from Kyle McCord, Jackson Kennedy kick (Drive: 7 plays, 75 yards, 2:24; Tied 21–21)
- (7:34) SYR – LeQuint Allen 2-yard run, Jackson Kennedy kick (Drive: 8 plays, 94 yards, 2:49; Syracuse 28–21)
- (0:13) SYR – Oronde Gadsden II 5-yard pass from Kyle McCord, Jackson Kennedy kick (Drive: 8 plays, 80 yards, 2:55; Syracuse 35–21)

Third quarter

- (2:06) WSU – Carlos Hernandez 42-yard pass from Zevi Eckhaus, Dean Janikowski kick (Drive: 10 plays, 79 yards, 5:02; Syracuse 35–28)
- (1:19) SYR – Trebor Pena 45-yard pass from Kyle McCord, Jackson Kennedy kick (Drive: 2 plays, 49 yards, 0:39; Syracuse 42–28)

Fourth quarter

- (9:19) SYR – Jackson Kennedy 30-yard field goal (Drive: 9 plays, 54 yards, 4:56; Syracuse 45–28)
- (3:23) SYR – LeQuint Allen 33-yard pass from Kyle McCord, Jackson Kennedy kick (Drive: 3 plays, 80 yards, 1:39; Syracuse 52–28)
- (0:09) WSU – Branden Ganashamoorthy 9-yard pass from Zevi Eckhaus, Dean Janikowski kick (Drive: 11 plays, 67 yards, 3:06; Syracuse 52–35)

Statistics	SYR	WSU
First downs	28	24
Total yards	606	472
Rushing yards	153	109
Passing yards	453	363
Passing: Comp–Att–Int	24–34–0	31–43–2
Time of possession	25:24	34:36

Team	Category	Player	Statistics
Syracuse	Passing	Kyle McCord	24/34, 453 yards, 5 TD
Syracuse	Rushing	LeQuint Allen	17 carries, 120 yards, 2 TD
Syracuse	Receiving	Darrell Gill Jr.	4 receptions, 145 yards
Washington State	Passing	Zevi Eckhaus	31/43, 363 yards, 3 TD, 2 INT
Washington State	Rushing	Leo Pulalasi	14 carries, 61 yards
Washington State	Receiving	Kyle Williams	10 receptions, 172 yards, TD

== Personnel ==
=== Roster and coaching staff ===
2024 Syracuse Orange football team roster
Players
Coaches
Offense

Pos.	#	Name	Class
TE	0	Maximilian Mang	Sr
RB	1	LeQuint Allen	Jr
WR	2	Trebor Pena	Jr
WR	3	Jaylan Hornsby	Fr
QB	4	Jakhari Williams	Fr
WR	5	Umari Hatcher	Jr
QB	6	Kyle McCord	Sr
WR	7	Jackson Meeks	Sr
WR	8	Zeed Haynes	Fr
QB	9	Michael Johnson Jr.	Sr
WR	10	Braden Davis	So
WR	11	Ta'Ron Haile	Fr
WR	12	Justus Ross-Simmons	Jr
TE	13	Jamie Trimble	Fr
QB	14	A. J. Miller	Fr
QB	16	Carlos Del Rio-Wilson	Jr
QB	17	Patrick Grusser	Fr
WR	18	Emanuel Ross	Fr
TE	19	Oronde Gadsden II	Jr
RB	22	Jaden Hart	Fr
RB	23	Yasin Willis	Fr
RB	24	Will Nixon	Jr
RB	27	Jordan Montanez	Fr
RB	31	Tyler Chandler	Fr
WR	32	Nick Armentano	Fr
WR	35	Kyle Acker	So
RB	36	Malachi James	Fr
FB	38	Max Runyon	Jr
OL	50	J'Onre Reed	Sr
OL	53	Ted Olsen	Fr
OL	54	Codie Hornsby	Jr
OL	55	Josh Ilaoa	Sr
OL	56	Patrick Alberga	Jr
OL	57	Da'Metrius Weatherspoon	Jr
OL	63	Carter Clark	So
OL	65	Adam Boehiem	Fr
OL	66	Willie Goodacre	Fr
OL	67	Noah Rosahac	Fr
OL	68	Vito Shevchenko	Fr
OL	70	Enrique Cruz Jr.	Jr
OL	71	Lysander Moesolo	Jr
OL	72	Mark Petry	Sr
OL	73	Joshua Miller	Fr
OL	74	Jakob Bradford	Sr
OL	75	Trevion Mack	Fr
OL	76	Travis Brown-Miller	Fr
OL	77	Savion Washington	Sr
OL	78	Joe Cruz	So
OL	79	David Wohlabaugh Jr.	Jr
WR	80	Ja'Meer Thomas	Fr
WR	82	Darrell Gill Jr.	So
TE	84	Elijah Washington-Baker	Fr
TE	86	David Clement	So
WR	87	Nate Edwards	Fr
TE	89	Dan Villari	Jr

Defense

Pos.	#	Name	Class
DB	0	Duce Chestnut	Jr
DB	1	Jayden Bellamy	So
LB	2	Marlowe Wax	Sr
DB	3	Clarence Lewis	Sr
DL	4	Dion Wilson Jr.	Sr
DB	5	Alijah Clark	Sr
LB	6	James Heard	Fr
DB	7	Marcellus Barnes Jr.	Fr
LB	8	Justin Barron	Sr
DL	9	Isaiah Hastings	So
DL	10	Fadil Diggs	Sr
DL	11	Denis Jaquez Jr.	Jr
LB	12	Anwar Sparrow	Jr
LB	15	Derek McDonald	Jr
DB	17	Jalil Martin	So
LB	18	David Omopariola	Fr
DL	19	KingJoseph Edwards	Fr
DB	19	Cornell Perry	So
DB	21	Jaeden Gould	So
LB	22	Zyian Moultrie-Goddard	Fr
DB	23	Devin Grant	Jr
DB	24	Ibn McDaniels	Fr
DB	25	Davien Kerr	Fr
DB	26	Braheem Long Jr.	Fr
LB	28	Jahide Lasaine Jr.	Fr
DB	29	Berry Buxton III	Jr
DL	30	Chase Simmons	Jr
DB	31	Marcus Washington Jr.	So
DB	32	Greg Delaine	So
LB	33	Caden Brown	Fr
DB	34	Nate Prater	Jr
DB	35	Nakei Johnson	Fr
LB	37	Luis Puente	Fr
DB	39	Clay Masters	Jr
DB	40	Tommy Porter	Jr
LB	42	Mark Short	Fr
LB	43	Garvin St. John	Fr
LB	45	Fatim Diggs	Fr
LB	49	Josh Kubala	So
DL	51	Stan Modo	Fr
DL	52	Braylen Ingraham	Sr
LB	54	Jayden Brown	Fr
DL	58	Xavier Miles	Fr
DL	88	Maraad Watson	Fr
DL	92	Rashard Perry	So
DL	93	Grant Winter	Fr
DL	94	Kevin Jobity Jr.	Jr
DL	95	Michael Nwokocha	Jr
DL	97	Clark Calloway	Fr
DL	99	Elijah Fuentes-Cundiff	Jr

Special teams

Pos.	#	Name	Class
K	15	Brady Denaburg	Jr
P	41	Jack Stonehouse	Jr
LS	46	Tom Callahan	Sr
LS	61	Ethan Stangle	So
LS	90	Jacob Zuhr	Jr
K	96	Jackson Kennedy	Jr
K	98	Jadyn Oh	Fr

Head coach

- Fran Brown

Coordinators/assistant coaches

- Elijah Robinson – Assistant head coach/defensive coordinator
- Jeff Nixon –Offensive coordinator/running backs
- James Vollono – Special teams coordinator
- Michael Johnson – Co-offensive coordinator/tight ends
- Robert Wright – Co-defensive coordinator/linebackers
- Nunzio Campanile – Associate offensive coach/quarterbacks
- Ross Douglas – Passing game coordinator/wide receivers
- Joe Schaefer – Defensive backs
- Dale Williams – Offensive linemen
- Nick Williams – Defensive ends
- Phill Guard – Offensive quality control
- Dimitri Hill – Offensive quality control
- Omar Hales – Defensive quality control
- Tyree Nobles – Quality control
- Devin Redd – Offensive analyst
- Kendall Coleman – Defensive analyst
- Jeremy Ruskin – Defensive analyst
- Nitron Stork – Defensive analyst
- Will Coale – Graduate assistant
- Tyshon Fogg – Graduate assistant
- Manny Harris – Graduate assistant

Legend

- (C) Team captain
- (S) Suspended
- (I) Ineligible
- Injured
- Redshirt

Roster
Last update: 11/29/24

== Rankings ==
Ranking movements Legend: ██ Increase in ranking ██ Decrease in ranking — = Not ranked RV = Received votes
	Week																
Poll	Pre	1	2	3	4	5	6	7	8	9	10	11	12	13	14	15	Final
AP	—	—	RV	RV	—	—	RV	RV	RV	—	—	—	RV	RV	23	22	20
Coaches	RV	RV	RV	RV	—	—	RV	RV	RV	—	—	—	RV	RV	25	25	22
CFP	Not released										—	—	—	—	22	21	Not released

== After the season ==
=== Awards and ACC honors ===
- Fran Brown – Paul “Bear” Bryant Newcomer Coach of the Year
- Fran Brown – FWAA First-Year Coach of the Year
