= 2024 NC State Wolfpack football team =

American college football season

2024 NC State Wolfpack football

Military Bowl, L 21–26 vs. East Carolina
- Conference: Atlantic Coast Conference
- Record: 6–7 (3–5 ACC)
- Head coach: Dave Doeren (12th season)
- Offensive coordinator: Robert Anae (2nd season)
- Offensive scheme: Veer and shoot
- Defensive coordinator: Tony Gibson (6th season; regular season); Freddie Aughtry-Lindsay (interim; bowl game)
- Base defense: 3–3–5
- Home stadium: Carter–Finley Stadium

2024 Atlantic Coast Conference football standings
| | Conf. | | | Overall |
| Team | W | | L | W | | L |
|---|---|---|---|---|---|---|
| No. 12 SMU y^ | 8 | – | 0 | 11 | – | 3 |
| No. 14 Clemson y$^ | 7 | – | 1 | 10 | – | 4 |
| No. 18 Miami (FL) | 6 | – | 2 | 10 | – | 3 |
| No. 20 Syracuse | 5 | – | 3 | 10 | – | 3 |
| Duke | 5 | – | 3 | 9 | – | 4 |
| Louisville | 5 | – | 3 | 9 | – | 4 |
| Georgia Tech | 5 | – | 3 | 7 | – | 6 |
| Boston College | 4 | – | 4 | 7 | – | 6 |
| Virginia Tech | 4 | – | 4 | 6 | – | 7 |
| Pittsburgh | 3 | – | 5 | 7 | – | 6 |
| NC State | 3 | – | 5 | 6 | – | 7 |
| North Carolina | 3 | – | 5 | 6 | – | 7 |
| Virginia | 3 | – | 5 | 5 | – | 7 |
| California | 2 | – | 6 | 6 | – | 7 |
| Wake Forest | 2 | – | 6 | 4 | – | 8 |
| Stanford | 2 | – | 6 | 3 | – | 9 |
| Florida State | 1 | – | 7 | 2 | – | 10 |
Championship: Clemson 34, SMU 31
^ – College Football Playoff participant; $ – Conference champion; y – Championship game participant; Rankings from AP Poll

The 2024 NC State Wolfpack football team represented North Carolina State University during the 2024 NCAA Division I FBS football season. The Wolfpack played their home games at Carter–Finley Stadium located in Raleigh, North Carolina, and competed as members of the Atlantic Coast Conference. They were led by head coach Dave Doeren, in his 12th season.

== Incoming transfers ==
Incoming transfers
| Name | Possison | Previous School |
|---|---|---|
| Donovan Kaufman | S | Auburn |
| Noah Rogers | WR | Ohio State |
| Tamarcus Cooley | CB | Maryland |
| Devon Marshall | CB | Villanova |
| Jordan Waters | RB | Duke |
| Hollywood Smothers | RB | Oklahoma |
| Val Erickson | OT | Missouri |
| Justin Joly | TE | UConn |
| Corey Coley Jr. | CB | Maryland |
| Wesley Grimes | WR | Wake Forest |
| Grayson McCall | QB | Coastal Carolina |
| Zeke Correll | IOL | Notre Dame |

== Preseason ==
=== ACC media poll ===
The Atlantic Coast Conference preseason poll was released on July 31. NC State was predicted to finish fourth in the conference.

| Predicted finish | Team | Votes (1st place) |
|---|---|---|
| 1 | Florida State | 2,708 (81) |
| 2 | Clemson | 2,657 (55) |
| 3 | Miami | 2,344 (17) |
| 4 | NC State | 2,318 (8) |
| 5 | Louisville | 1,984 |
| 6 | Virginia Tech | 1,968 (5) |
| 7 | SMU | 1,798 |
| 8 | North Carolina | 1,712 |
| 9 | Georgia Tech | 1,539 (1) |
| 10 | California | 1,095 (2) |
| 11 | Duke | 1,056 |
| 12 | Syracuse | 1,035 |
| 13 | Pittsburgh | 1,016 |
| 14 | Boston College | 890 (1) |
| 15 | Wake Forest | 784 |
| 16 | Virginia | 629 |
| 17 | Stanford | 477 |

== Schedule ==
NC State announced its 2024 football schedule on January 24, 2024. The 2024 schedule consists of seven home games and four away games, and one neutral game in the regular season. The Wolfpack hosted ACC foes Duke, Stanford, Syracuse, and Wake Forest and traveled to California, Clemson, Georgia Tech, and North Carolina.

The Wolfpack hosted three of the four non-conference opponents, Louisiana Tech from Conference USA, Northern Illinois from the MAC, and Western Carolina from the Southern Conference (FCS), and played Tennessee from the SEC in a neutral site game in Charlotte.

| Date | Time | Opponent | Rank | Site | TV | Result | Attendance |
|---|---|---|---|---|---|---|---|
| August 29 | 7:00 p.m. | No. 20 (FCS) Western Carolina* | No. 24 | Carter–Finley Stadium; Raleigh, NC | ACCN | W 38–21 | 56,919 |
| September 7 | 7:30 p.m. | vs. No. 14 Tennessee* | No. 24 | Bank of America Stadium; Charlotte, NC (Duke's Mayo Classic) | ABC | L 10–51 | 72,730 |
| September 14 | 12:00 p.m. | Louisiana Tech* | | Carter–Finley Stadium; Raleigh, NC | ACCN | W 30–20 | 56,919 |
| September 21 | 12:00 p.m. | at No. 21 Clemson | | Memorial Stadium; Clemson, SC (Textile Bowl) | ABC | L 35–59 | 81,500 |
| September 28 | 12:00 p.m. | Northern Illinois* | | Carter–Finley Stadium; Raleigh, NC | CW | W 24–17 | 56,919 |
| October 5 | 12:00 p.m. | Wake Forest | | Carter–Finley Stadium; Raleigh, NC (rivalry) | CW | L 30–34 | 56,919 |
| October 12 | 8:00 p.m. | Syracuse | | Carter–Finley Stadium; Raleigh, NC | ACCN | L 17–24 | 56,919 |
| October 19 | 3:30 p.m. | at California | | California Memorial Stadium; Berkeley, CA | ACCN | W 24–23 | 35,303 |
| November 2 | 12:00 p.m. | Stanford^{†} | | Carter–Finley Stadium; Raleigh, NC | ACCN | W 59–28 | 56,919 |
| November 9 | 3:30 p.m. | Duke | | Carter–Finley Stadium; Raleigh, NC (rivalry) | ACCN | L 19–29 | 56,919 |
| November 21 | 7:30 p.m. | at Georgia Tech | | Bobby Dodd Stadium; Atlanta, GA | ESPN | L 29–30 | 34,591 |
| November 30 | 3:30 p.m. | at North Carolina | | Kenan Stadium; Chapel Hill, NC (rivalry) | ACCN | W 35–30 | 50,500 |
| December 28 | 5:45 p.m. | vs. East Carolina* | | Navy–Marine Corps Memorial Stadium; Annapolis, MD (Military Bowl / rivalry) | ESPN | L 21–26 | 23,981 |
*Non-conference game; ^{†}Homecoming; Rankings from AP Poll - Released prior to game; All times are in Eastern time

== Game summaries ==
=== vs. No. 20 (FCS) Western Carolina ===
No. 20 (FCS) Western Carolina Catamounts (0–0) at No. 24 NC State Wolfpack (0–0) – Game summary

| Quarter | 1 | 2 | 3 | 4 | Total |
|---|---|---|---|---|---|
| No. 20 (FCS) Catamounts | 14 | 0 | 7 | 0 | 21 |
| No. 24 Wolfpack | 7 | 7 | 3 | 21 | 38 |

at Carter–Finley Stadium • Raleigh, NC

- Date: August 29, 2024
- Game time: 7:00 p.m.
- Game weather: Sunny, 88 °F (31 °C)
- Game attendance: 56,919
- Referee: Riley Johnson
- TV announcers (ACCN): Wes Durham (play-by-play), Tom Luginbill (analyst), and Dana Boyle (sideline reporter)

Game information

First quarter

- (5:55) WCU – Jake Young 8-yard pass from Cole Gonzales (Christian Lowery kick) (Drive: 1 play, 8 yards, 0:08; Western Carolina 7–0)
- (2:39) NCSU – Kevin Concepcion 17-yard pass from Grayson McCall (Kanoah Vinesett kick) (Drive: 7 plays, 75 yards, 3:16; Tied 7–7)
- (0:05) WCU – AJ Colombo 12-yard pass from Cole Gonzales (Christian Lowery kick) (Drive: 6 plays, 75 yards, 2:34; Western Carolina 14–7)

Second quarter

- (12:03) NCSU – Kevin Concepcion 5-yard pass from Grayson McCall (Kanoah Vinesett kick) (Drive: 7 plays, 75 yards, 3:02; Tied 14–14)

Third quarter

- (8:00) NCSU – Kanoah Vinesett 46-yard field goal (Drive: 14 plays, 39 yards, 6:52; NC State 17–14)
- (4:36) WCU – Branson Adams 17-yard run (Christian Lowery kick) (Drive: 6 plays, 75 yards, 3:24; Western Carolina 21–17)

Fourth quarter

- (14:45) NCSU – Kevin Concepcion 35-yard pass from Grayson McCall (Kanoah Vinesett kick) (Drive: 5 plays, 51 yards, 0:47; NC State 24–21)
- (6:33) NCSU – Jordan Waters 7-yard run (Kanoah Vinesett kick) (Drive: 9 plays, 81 yards, 5:31; NC State 31–21)
- (1:50) NCSU – Jordan Waters 50-yard run (Kanoah Vinesett kick) (Drive: 5 plays, 80 yards, 2:28; NC State 38–21)

| Statistics | WCU | NCSU |
|---|---|---|
| First downs | 16 | 28 |
| Total yards | 58–364 | 73–521 |
| Rushing yards | 18–123 | 33–203 |
| Passing yards | 241 | 318 |
| Passing: Comp–Att–Int | 24–40–0 | 26–40–1 |
| Time of possession | 24:30 | 35:30 |

| Team | Category | Player | Statistics |
|---|---|---|---|
| Western Carolina | Passing | Cole Gonzales | 22/35, 211 yards, 2 TD |
| Western Carolina | Rushing | Cole Gonzales | 6 carries, 75 yards |
| Western Carolina | Receiving | AJ Colombo | 9 receptions, 97 yards, TD |
| NC State | Passing | Grayson McCall | 26/40, 318 yards, 3 TD, INT |
| NC State | Rushing | Jordan Waters | 20 carries, 123 yards, 2 TD |
| NC State | Receiving | Kevin Concepcion | 9 receptions, 121 yards, 3 TD |

=== vs. No. 14 Tennessee ===
No. 14 Tennessee Volunteers (1–0) vs. No. 24 NC State Wolfpack (1–0) – Game summary

| Quarter | 1 | 2 | 3 | 4 | Total |
|---|---|---|---|---|---|
| No. 14 Volunteers | 7 | 13 | 17 | 14 | 51 |
| No. 24 Wolfpack | 0 | 3 | 7 | 0 | 10 |

at Bank of America Stadium • Charlotte, NC

- Date: September 7, 2024
- Game time: 7:30 p.m.
- Game weather: 75 °F (24 °C)
- Game attendance: 72,730
- Referee: Kole Knueppel
- TV announcers (ABC): Rece Davis (play-by-play), Kirk Herbstreit (analyst), and Holly Rowe (sideline reporter)

Game information

First quarter

- (0:09) TENN – Dylan Sampson 9-yard run (Max Gilbert kick) (Drive: 9 plays, 62 yards, 4:10; Tennessee 7–0)

Second quarter

- (9:04) NCSU – Kanoah Vinesett 24-yard field goal (Drive: 6 plays, 40 yards, 2:30; Tennessee 7–3)
- (6:33) TENN – Max Gilbert 32-yard field goal (Drive: 7 plays, 61 yards, 2:28; Tennessee 10–3)
- (3:29) TENN – Will Brooks 85-yard interception return (Max Gilbert kick) (Drive: 1 plays, 85 yards, 0:08; Tennessee 17–3)
- (0:00) TENN – Max Gilbert 45-yard field goal (Drive: 6 plays, 18 yards, 1:44; Tennessee 20–3)

Third quarter

- (10:27) TENN – Miles Kitselman 35-yard pass from Nico Iamaleava (Max Gilbert kick) (Drive: 10 plays, 75 yards, 4:33; Tennessee 27–3)
- (6:31) TENN – Max Gilbert 36-yard field goal (Drive: 4 plays, 5 yards, 1:40; Tennessee 30–3)
- (4:02) TENN – Nico Iamaleava 31-yard run (Max Gilbert kick) (Drive: 3 plays, 34 yards, 0:43; Tennessee 37–3)
- (2:20) NCSU – Aydan White 87-yard interception return (Kanoah Vinesett kick) (Drive: 1 plays, 85 yards, 0:10; Tennessee 37–10)

Fourth quarter

- (14:07) TENN – Dylan Sampson 34-yard run (Max Gilbert kick) (Drive: 5 plays, 60 yards, 3:13; Tennessee 44–10)
- (8:22) TENN – Holden Staes 18-yard pass from Nico Iamaleava (Max Gilbert kick) (Drive: 5 plays, 34 yards, 2:58; Tennessee 51–10)

| Statistics | TENN | NCSU |
|---|---|---|
| First downs | 22 | 10 |
| Total yards | 67–460 | 50–143 |
| Rushing yards | 44–249 | 28–39 |
| Passing yards | 211 | 104 |
| Passing: Comp–Att–Int | 16–23–2 | 15–22–1 |
| Time of possession | 31:28 | 28:32 |

| Team | Category | Player | Statistics |
|---|---|---|---|
| Tennessee | Passing | Nico Iamaleava | 16/23, 211 yards, 2 TD, 2 INT |
| Tennessee | Rushing | Dylan Sampson | 20 carries, 132 yards, 2 TD |
| Tennessee | Receiving | Squirrel White | 2 receptions, 67 yards |
| NC State | Passing | Grayson McCall | 15/22, 104 yards, 1 INT |
| NC State | Rushing | Hollywood Smothers | 6 carries, 25 yards |
| NC State | Receiving | Kevin Concepcion | 5 receptions, 53 yards |

=== Louisiana Tech ===
Louisiana Tech Bulldogs (1–0) at NC State Wolfpack (1–1) – Game summary

| Quarter | 1 | 2 | 3 | 4 | Total |
|---|---|---|---|---|---|
| Bulldogs | 0 | 17 | 3 | 0 | 20 |
| Wolfpack | 3 | 3 | 14 | 10 | 30 |

at Carter–Finley Stadium • Raleigh, NC

- Date: September 14, 2024
- Game time: 12:00 p.m.
- Game weather: Cloudy, 78 °F (26 °C)
- Game attendance: 56,919
- Referee: Nate Black
- TV announcers (ACCN): Jorge Sedano (play-by-play), Orlando Franklin (analyst), and Morgan Uber (sideline reporter)

Game information

First quarter

- NCSU – Kanoah Vinesett 39-yard field goal, 5:04. Wolfpack 3–0. Drive: 7 plays, 18 yards, 4:24.

Second quarter

- NCSU – Kanoah Vinesett 35-yard field goal, 5:29. Wolfpack 6–0. Drive: 13 plays, 63 yards, 6:27.
- LT – Donerio Davenport 5-yard run (Buck Buchanan kick), 2:41. Bulldogs 7–6. Drive: 6 plays, 75 yards, 2:47.
- LT – Tru Edwards 71-yard pass from Jack Turner (Buck Buchanan kick), 1:19. Bulldogs 14–6. Drive: 1 play, 71 yards, 0:13.
- LT – Buck Buchanan 57-yard field goal, 0:13. Bulldogs 17–6. Drive: 4 plays, 6 yards, 0:48.

Third quarter

- NCSU – D. K. Kaufman 33-yard interception return (Kanoah Vinesett kick), 14:03. Bulldogs 17–13.
- NCSU – Kendrick Raphael 3-yard run (Kanoah Vinesett kick), 4:23. Wolfpack 20–17. Drive: 13 plays, 76 yards, 8:11.
- LT – Buck Buchanan 20-yard field goal, 0:36. Tied 20–20. Drive: 9 plays, 73 yards, 3:47.

Fourth quarter

- NCSU – Kanoah Vinesett 52-yard field goal, 12:32. Wolfpack 23–20. Drive: 9 plays, 40 yards, 3:04.
- NCSU – C. J. Bailey 1-yard run (Kanoah Vinesett kick), 7:21. Wolfpack 30–20. Drive: 8 plays, 66 yards, 4:12.

| Statistics | LT | NCSU |
|---|---|---|
| First downs | 12 | 20 |
| Total yards | 324 | 361 |
| Rushing yards | 43 | 151 |
| Passing yards | 281 | 210 |
| Passing: Comp–Att–Int | 19–36–1 | 22–33–1 |
| Time of possession | 23:24 | 36:36 |

| Team | Category | Player | Statistics |
|---|---|---|---|
| Louisiana Tech | Passing | Jack Turner | 19/36, 281 yards, TD, INT |
| Louisiana Tech | Rushing | Donerio Davenport | 6 rushes, 21 yards, TD |
| Louisiana Tech | Receiving | Tru Edwards | 4 receptions, 148 yards, TD |
| NC State | Passing | C. J. Bailey | 13/20, 156 yards, INT |
| NC State | Rushing | Kendrick Raphael | 9 rushes, 63 yards, TD |
| NC State | Receiving | Dacari Collins | 3 receptions, 55 yards |

=== at No. 21 Clemson ===
NC State Wolfpack (2–1) at No. 21 Clemson Tigers (1–1) – Game summary

| Quarter | 1 | 2 | 3 | 4 | Total |
|---|---|---|---|---|---|
| Wolfpack | 0 | 7 | 7 | 21 | 35 |
| No. 21 Tigers | 28 | 17 | 14 | 0 | 59 |

at Memorial Stadium • Clemson, SC

- Date: September 21, 2024
- Game time: 12:00 p.m.
- Game weather: Sunny, 84 °F (29 °C)
- Game attendance: 81,500
- Referee: Adam Savoie
- TV announcers (ABC): Sean McDonough (play-by-play), Greg McElroy (analyst), and Molly McGrath (sideline reporter)

Game information

First quarter

- (13:29) Clemson – Cade Klubnik 55-yard run, Nolan Hauser kick (Drive: 4 plays, 75 yards, 1:31; Clemson 7–0)
- (7:56) Clemson – Antonio Williams 31-yard pass from Cade Klubnik, Nolan Hauser kick (Drive: 6 plays, 91 yards, 1:34; Clemson 14–0)
- (5:07) Clemson – Antonio Williams 2-yard pass from Cade Klubnik, Nolan Hauser kick (Drive: 5 plays, 18 yards, 2:05; Clemson 21–0)
- (2:08) Clemson – Phil Mafah 38-yard run, Nolan Hauser kick (Drive: 1 play, 38 yards, 0:07; Clemson 28–0)

Second quarter

- (7:25) NC State – Jordan Waters 5-yard pass from CJ Bailey, Kanoah Vinesett kick (Drive: 9 plays, 71 yards, 4:37; Clemson 28–7)
- (5:53) Clemson – Cole Turner 18-yard run, Nolan Hauser kick (Drive: 5 plays, 75 yards, 1:32; Clemson 35–7)
- (1:15) Clemson – Jay Haynes 19-yard run, Nolan Hauser kick (Drive: 9 plays, 89 yards, 3:12; Clemson 42–7)
- (0:00) Clemson – Nolan Hauser 20-yard field goal (Drive: 7 plays, 24 yards, 0:47; Clemson 45–7)

Third quarter

- (9:07) Clemson – Adam Randall 4-yard pass from Cade Klubnik, Nolan Hauser kick (Drive: 7 plays, 54 yards, 3:05; Clemson 52–7)
- (6:38) NC State – Kendrick Raphael 10-yard run, Kanoah Vinesett kick (Drive: 4 plays, 75 yards, 2:29; Clemson 52–14)
- (0:32) Clemson – Ashton Hampton 53-yard interception return, Nolan Hauser kick (Clemson 59–14)

Fourth quarter

- (12:07) NC State – Hollywood Smothers 2-yard run, Kanoah Vinesett kick (Drive: 6 plays, 75 yards, 3:25; Clemson 59–21)
- (8:21) NC State – Demarcus Jones II 6-yard run, Kanoah Vinesett kick (Drive: 4 plays, 52 yards, 1:39; Clemson 59–28)
- (0:05) NC State – Terrell Anderson 40-yard pass from Lex Thomas, Kanoah Vinesett kick (Drive: 10 plays, 87 yards, 3:42; Clemson 59–35)

| Statistics | NCSU | CLEM |
|---|---|---|
| First downs | 25 | 24 |
| Total yards | 440 | 523 |
| Rushing yards | 183 | 269 |
| Passing yards | 257 | 254 |
| Passing: Comp–Att–Int | 20–31–1 | 21–34–0 |
| Time of possession | 33:11 | 26:49 |

| Team | Category | Player | Statistics |
|---|---|---|---|
| NC State | Passing | C. J. Bailey | 16/25, 204 yards, TD, INT |
| NC State | Rushing | Kendrick Raphael | 10 carries, 94 yards, TD |
| NC State | Receiving | Kevin Concepcion | 5 receptions, 40 yards |
| Clemson | Passing | Cade Klubnik | 16/24, 209 yards, 3 TD |
| Clemson | Rushing | Phil Mafah | 7 carries, 107 yards, TD |
| Clemson | Receiving | Adam Randall | 5 receptions, 69 yards, TD |

=== Northern Illinois ===
Northern Illinois Huskies (2–1) at NC State Wolfpack (2–2) – Game summary

| Quarter | 1 | 2 | 3 | 4 | Total |
|---|---|---|---|---|---|
| Huskies | 7 | 7 | 0 | 3 | 17 |
| Wolfpack | 7 | 10 | 7 | 0 | 24 |

at Carter–Finley Stadium • Raleigh, NC

- Date: September 28, 2024
- Game time: 12:00 p.m.
- Game weather: Sunny, 79 °F (26 °C)
- Game attendance: 56,919
- Referee: Justin Elliot
- TV announcers (CW): Thom Brennaman (play-by-play), Max Browne (analyst) and Carla Gebhart (sideline)

Game information

First quarter

- NCSU – CJ Bailey 1-yard run (Kanoah Vinesett kick), 6:15. Wolfpack 7–0. Drive: 8 plays, 64 yards, 5:02.
- NIU – Brock Lampe 0-yard run (Kanon Woodill kick), 2:23. Tied 7–7. Drive: 7 plays, 75 yards, 3:52.

Second quarter

- NCSU – DK Kaufman 2-yard fumble return (Kanoah Vinesett kick), 14:09. Wolfpack 14–7. Drive: 3 plays, -10 yards, 1:07.
- NCSU – Kanoah Vinesett 37-yard field goal, 4:55. Wolfpack 17–7. Drive: 5 plays, 36 yards, 2:43.
- NIU – Cam Thompson 6-yard pass from Ethan Hampton (Kanon Woodill kick), 1:45. Wolfpack 17–14. Drive: 9 plays, 75 yards, 3:10.

Third quarter

- NCSU – Kevin Concepcion 3-yard pass from CJ Bailey (Kanoah Vinesett kick), 11:46. Wolfpack 24–14. Drive: 3 plays, 1 yard, 1:33.

Fourth quarter

- NIU – Kanon Woodill 50-yard field goal, 14:46. Wolfpack 24–17. Drive: 14 plays, 48 yards, 6:01.

| Statistics | NIU | NCSU |
|---|---|---|
| First downs | 20 | 11 |
| Total yards | 279 | 176 |
| Rushing yards | 120 | 67 |
| Passing yards | 159 | 109 |
| Passing: Comp–Att–Int | 14–29–2 | 13–20–0 |
| Time of possession | 32:41 | 27:19 |

| Team | Category | Player | Statistics |
|---|---|---|---|
| Northern Illinois | Passing | Ethan Hampton | 14/29, 159 YDS, 1 TD, 2 INT |
| Northern Illinois | Rushing | Antario Brown | 28 CAR, 114 YDS |
| Northern Illinois | Receiving | Andrew McElroy | 3 REC, 58 YDS |
| NC State | Passing | C. J. Bailey | 13/20, 109 YDS, 1 TD |
| NC State | Rushing | C. J. Bailey | 10 CAR, 22 YDS, 1 TD |
| NC State | Receiving | Noah Rogers | 2 REC, 48 YDS |

=== Wake Forest ===
Wake Forest Demon Deacons (1–3) at NC State Wolfpack (3–2) – Game summary

| Quarter | 1 | 2 | 3 | 4 | Total |
|---|---|---|---|---|---|
| Demon Deacons | 10 | 7 | 3 | 14 | 34 |
| Wolfpack | 3 | 13 | 7 | 7 | 30 |

at Carter–Finley Stadium • Raleigh, NC

- Date: October 5, 2024
- Game time: 12:00 p.m.
- Game weather: Sunny, 78 °F (26 °C)
- Game attendance: 56,919
- Referee: Tim Hedgepeth
- TV announcers (CW): Thom Brennaman (play-by-play) and Max Browne (analyst) Treavor Scales (sideline)

Game information

First quarter

- WF – Matthew Dennis 31-yard field goal, 11:50. Demon Deacons 3–0. Drive: 9 plays, 62 yards, 3:10.
- WF – Demond Claiborne 3-yard pass from Hank Bachmeier (Matthew Dennis kick), 8:51. Demon Deacons 10–0. Drive: 2 plays, 2 yards, 0:36.
- NCSU – Kanoah Vinesett 35-yard field goal, 3:09. Demon Deacons 10–3. Drive: 11 plays, 57 yards, 5:42.

Second quarter

- NCSU – Keenan Jackson 9-yard pass from CJ Bailey (Kanoah Vinesett kick), 11:30. Tied 10–10. Drive: 12 plays, 55 yards, 5:47.
- NCSU – Kanoah Vinesett 35-yard field goal, 2:58. Wolfpack 13–10. Drive: 13 plays, 61 yards, 7:13.
- WF – Horatio Fields 23-yard pass from Hank Bachmeier (Matthew Dennis kick), 1:28. Demon Deacons 17–13. Drive: 7 plays, 75 yards, 1:30.
- NCSU – Kanoah Vinesett 37-yard field goal, 0:03. Demon Deacons 17–16. Drive: 9 plays, 55 yards, 1:25.

Third quarter

- WF – Matthew Dennis 41-yard field goal, 6:28. Demon Deacons 20–16. Drive: 8 plays, 52 yards, 3:03.
- NCSU – Kendrick Raphael 20-yard run (Kanoah Vinesett kick), 3:02. Wolfpack 23–20. Drive: 7 plays, 75 yards, 3:26.

Fourth quarter

- NCSU – Justin Joly 22-yard pass from C. J. Bailey (Kanoah Vinesett kick), 13:08. Wolfpack 30–20. Drive: 7 plays, 62 yards, 3:51.
- WF – Demond Claiborne 32-yard run (Matthew Dennis kick), 8:43. Wolfpack 30–27. Drive: 9 plays, 75 yards, 4:25.
- WF – Demond Claiborne 3-yard run (Matthew Dennis kick), 1:01. Demon Deacons 34–30. Drive: 13 plays, 65 yards, 6:06.

| Statistics | WAKE | NCSU |
|---|---|---|
| First downs | 21 | 28 |
| Total yards | 315 | 419 |
| Rushing yards | 161 | 105 |
| Passing yards | 154 | 314 |
| Passing: Comp–Att–Int | 16–32–1 | 31–47–1 |
| Time of possession | 24:08 | 35:52 |

| Team | Category | Player | Statistics |
|---|---|---|---|
| Wake Forest | Passing | Hank Bachmeier | 16/32, 154 YDS, 2 TD, 1 INT |
| Wake Forest | Rushing | Demond Claiborne | 20 CAR, 136 YDS, 2 TD |
| Wake Forest | Receiving | Micah Mays Jr. | 48 REC, 48 YDS |
| NC State | Passing | C. J. Bailey | 28/42, 272 YDS, 2 TD, 1 INT |
| NC State | Rushing | Kendrick Raphael | 10 CAR, 48 YDS, 1 TD |
| NC State | Receiving | Justin Joly | 4 REC, 73 YDS, 1 TD |

=== Syracuse ===
Syracuse Orange (4–1) at NC State Wolfpack (3–3) – Game summary

| Quarter | 1 | 2 | 3 | 4 | Total |
|---|---|---|---|---|---|
| Orange | 3 | 7 | 7 | 7 | 24 |
| Wolfpack | 0 | 7 | 0 | 10 | 17 |

at Carter–Finley Stadium • Raleigh, NC

- Date: October 12, 2024
- Game time: 8:00 p.m.
- Game weather: Clear, 64 °F (18 °C)
- Game attendance: 56,919
- Referee: Riley Johnson
- TV announcers (ACCN): Wes Durham (play-by-play), Tom Luginbill (analyst), and Dana Boyle (sideline reporter)

Game information

First quarter

- SYR – Jadyn Oh 32-yard field goal, 8:13. Orange 3–0. Drive: 16 plays, 61 yards, 6:47.

Second quarter

- SYR – Umari Hatcher 28-yard pass from Kyle McCord (Jadyn Oh kick), 2:33. Orange 10–0. Drive: 7 plays, 83 yards, 2:45.
- NCSU – Justin Joly 14-yard pass from CJ Bailey (Kanoah Vinesett kick), 0:31. Orange 10–7. Drive: 7 plays, 75 yards, 2:02.

Third quarter

- SYR – LeQuint Allen 4-yard run (Jadyn Oh kick), 6:39. Orange 17–7. Drive: 8 plays, 73 yards, 3:27.

Fourth quarter

- SYR – Jackson Meeks 2-yard pass from Kyle McCord (Jadyn Oh kick), 10:20. Orange 24–7. Drive: 8 plays, 38 yards, 6:04.
- NCSU – Noah Rogers 75-yard pass from CJ Bailey (Kanoah Vinesett kick), 9:31. Orange 24–14. Drive: 2 plays, 75 yards, 0:49.
- NCSU – Kanoah Vinesett 29-yard field goal, 1:32. Orange 24–17. Drive: 6 plays, 81 yards, 1:40.

| Statistics | SYR | NCSU |
|---|---|---|
| First downs | 25 | 19 |
| Total yards | 424 | 411 |
| Rushing yards | 78 | 82 |
| Passing yards | 346 | 329 |
| Passing: Comp–Att–Int | 31–43–1 | 17–24–1 |
| Time of possession | 36:52 | 23:08 |

| Team | Category | Player | Statistics |
|---|---|---|---|
| Syracuse | Passing | Kyle McCord | 31/42, 346 YDS, 2 TD |
| Syracuse | Rushing | LeQuint Allen | 21 CAR, 91 YDS, 1 TD |
| Syracuse | Receiving | Jackson Meeks | 11 REC, 116 YDS, 1 TD |
| NC State | Passing | CJ Bailey | 17/24, 329 YDS, 2 TD, 1 INT |
| NC State | Rushing | CJ Bailey | 7 CAR, 28 YDS |
| NC State | Receiving | Noah Rogers | 4 REC, 95 YDS, 1 TD |

=== at California ===
NC State Wolfpack (3–4) at California Golden Bears (3–3) – Game summary

| Quarter | 1 | 2 | 3 | 4 | Total |
|---|---|---|---|---|---|
| Wolfpack | 3 | 7 | 0 | 14 | 24 |
| Golden Bears | 7 | 6 | 10 | 0 | 23 |

at California Memorial Stadium • Berkeley, CA

- Date: October 19, 2024
- Game time: 3:30 p.m.
- Game weather: Sunny, 76 °F (24 °C)
- Game attendance: 35,303
- Referee: Jerry Magallanes
- TV announcers (ACCN): Jorge Sedano (play-by-play), Orlando Franklin (analyst), and Morgan Uber (sideline reporter)

Game information

First quarter
Second quarter
Third quarter
Fourth quarter

| Statistics | NCSU | CAL |
|---|---|---|
| First downs | 15 | 23 |
| Total yards | 363 | 399 |
| Rushing yards | 29 | 117 |
| Passing yards | 334 | 282 |
| Passing: Comp–Att–Int | 26–37–0 | 30–43–0 |
| Time of possession | 32:37 | 27:23 |

| Team | Category | Player | Statistics |
|---|---|---|---|
| NC State | Passing | CJ Bailey | 25/36, 306 YDS, 2 TD |
| NC State | Rushing | Hollywood Smothers | 7 carries, 25 yards |
| NC State | Receiving | Justin Joly | 4 receptions, 95 yards |
| California | Passing | Fernando Mendoza | 30/42, 282 YDS, 2 TD |
| California | Rushing | Jaivian Thomas | 9 carries, 78 yards, 2 TD |
| California | Receiving | Jack Endries | 9 receptions, 101 yards |

=== Stanford ===
Stanford Cardinal (2–6) at NC State Wolfpack (4–4) – Game summary

| Quarter | 1 | 2 | 3 | 4 | Total |
|---|---|---|---|---|---|
| Cardinal | 7 | 7 | 7 | 7 | 28 |
| Wolfpack | 14 | 17 | 21 | 7 | 59 |

at Carter–Finley Stadium • Raleigh, NC

- Date: November 2, 2024
- Game time: 12:00 p.m.
- Game weather: Cloudy, 62 °F (17 °C)
- Game attendance: 56,919
- Referee: Riley Johnson
- TV announcers (ACCN): Jorge Sedano (play-by-play), Orlando Franklin (analyst) and Morgan Uber (sideline)

Game information

First quarter

- (9:29) NCSU – Hollywood Smothers 2-yard run, Collin Smith kick (Drive: 9 plays, 55 yards, 5:24; NC State 7–0)
- (5:06) NCSU – Jordan Waters 13-yard run, Collin Smith kick (Drive: 4 plays, 32 yards, 1:48; NC State 14–0)
- (2:56) STAN – Ashton Daniels 67-yard run, Emmet Kenney kick (Drive: 5 plays, 70 yards, 2:03; NC State 14–7)

Second quarter

- (14:15) NCSU – Collin Smith 23-yard field goal (Drive: 6 plays, 65 yards, 3:35; NC State 17–7)
- (11:15) STAN – Justin Lamson 3-yard run, Emmet Kenney kick (Drive: 6 plays, 75 yards, 3:00; NC State 17–14)
- (5:15) NCSU – Justin Joly 9-yard pass from CJ Bailey, Collin Smith kick (Drive: 11 plays, 75 yards, 6:00; NC State 24–14)
- (0:34) NCSU – Keenan Jackson 8-yard pass from CJ Bailey, Collin Smith kick (Drive: 9 plays, 70 yards, 3:09; NC State 31–14)

Third quarter

- (11:22) STAN – Ashton Daniels 48-yard run, Emmet Kenney kick (Drive: 6 plays, 75 yards, 3:38; NC State 31–21)
- (11:04) NCSU – KC Concepcion 9-yard run, Collin Smith kick (Drive: 1 play, 9 yards, 0:06; NC State 38–21)
- (7:12) NCSU – Hollywood Smothers 52-yard run, Collin Smith kick (Drive: 2 plays, 53 yards, 0:55; NC State 45–21)
- (4:55) NCSU – Jordan Waters 94-yard run, Collin Smith kick (Drive: 1 play, 94 yards, 0:14; NC State 52–21)

Fourth quarter

- (13:04) NCSU – KC Concepcion 5-yard pass from CJ Bailey, Collin Smith kick (Drive: 8 plays, 58 yards, 5:02; NC State 59–21)
- (5:47) STAN – Elic Ayomanor 14-yard pass from Justin Lamson, Emmet Kenney kick (Drive: 4 plays, 40 yards, 1:59; NC State 59–28)

| Statistics | STAN | NCSU |
|---|---|---|
| First downs | 16 | 25 |
| Total yards | 398 | 527 |
| Rushing yards | 225 | 281 |
| Passing yards | 173 | 246 |
| Passing: Comp–Att–Int | 9–16–1 | 19–22–1 |
| Time of possession | 26:19 | 33:41 |

| Team | Category | Player | Statistics |
|---|---|---|---|
| Stanford | Passing | Justin Lamson | 3/8, 103 yards, TD, INT |
| Stanford | Rushing | Ashton Daniels | 11 carries, 129 yards, 2 TD |
| Stanford | Receiving | Elic Ayomanor | 4 receptions, 108 yards, TD |
| NC State | Passing | CJ Bailey | 18/20, 234 yards, 3 TD |
| NC State | Rushing | Jordan Waters | 5 carries, 115 yards, 2 TD |
| NC State | Receiving | Justin Joly | 4 receptions, 66 yards, TD |

=== Duke ===
Duke Blue Devils (6–3) at NC State Wolfpack (5–4) – Game summary

| Quarter | 1 | 2 | 3 | 4 | Total |
|---|---|---|---|---|---|
| Blue Devils | 12 | 0 | 7 | 10 | 29 |
| Wolfpack | 0 | 9 | 3 | 7 | 19 |

at Carter–Finley Stadium • Raleigh, NC

- Date: November 9, 2024
- Game time: 3:30 p.m.
- Game attendance: 56,919
- TV announcers (ACCN): Chris Cotter (play-by-play), Mark Herzlich (analyst) and Coley Harvey (sideline)

Game information

First quarter
Second quarter
Third quarter
Fourth quarter

| Statistics | DUKE | NCSU |
|---|---|---|
| First downs | 16 | 19 |
| Total yards | 276 | 268 |
| Rushing yards | 31 | 84 |
| Passing yards | 245 | 184 |
| Passing: Comp–Att–Int | 22–31–0 | 16–39–1 |
| Time of possession | 29:33 | 30:27 |

| Team | Category | Player | Statistics |
|---|---|---|---|
| Duke | Passing | Maalik Murphy | 22/31, 245 yards, 2 TD |
| Duke | Rushing | Star Thomas | 17 carries, 36 yards |
| Duke | Receiving | Que'Sean Brown | 5 receptions, 88 yards |
| NC State | Passing | CJ Bailey | 16/39, 184 yards, 1 TD, 1 INT |
| NC State | Rushing | CJ Bailey | 10 carries, 36 yards |
| NC State | Receiving | Justin Joly | 4 receptions, 52 yards |

=== at Georgia Tech ===
NC State Wolfpack (5–5) at Georgia Tech Yellow Jackets (6–4) – Game summary

| Quarter | 1 | 2 | 3 | 4 | Total |
|---|---|---|---|---|---|
| Wolfpack | 7 | 0 | 0 | 22 | 29 |
| Yellow Jackets | 7 | 6 | 3 | 14 | 30 |

at Bobby Dodd Stadium • Atlanta, GA

- Date: Thursday November 21, 2024
- Game time: 7:30 PM
- Game weather: Sunny, 44 °F (7 °C)
- Game attendance: 34,591
- Referee: Stuart Mullins
- TV announcers (ESPN): Matt Barrie (play-by-play), Dan Mullen (analyst) and Harry Lyles Jr. (sideline)

Game information

First quarter

- (7:18) GT – E. J. Lightsey 21-yard interception return, Aidan Birr kick (Georgia Tech 7–0)
- (2:27) NCSU – CJ Bailey 16-yard run, Kanoah Vinesett kick (Drive: 9 plays, 75 yards, 4:51; Tied 7–7)

Second quarter

- (12:29) GT – Aidan Birr 44-yard field goal (Drive: 10 plays, 49 yards, 4:58; Georgia Tech 10–7)
- (5:16) GT – Aidan Birr 41-yard field goal (Drive: 11 plays, 43 yards, 6:17; Georgia Tech 13–7)

Third quarter

- (3:55) GT – Aidan Birr 45-yard field goal (Drive: 7 plays, 60 yards, 3:34; Georgia Tech 16–7)

Fourth quarter

- (14:47) NCSU – CJ Bailey 28-yard run, Kanoah Vinesett kick (Drive: 7 plays, 75 yards, 4:08; Georgia Tech 16–14)
- (6:40) GT – Haynes King 3-yard run, Aidan Birr kick (Drive: 1 play, 3 yards, 0:04; Georgia Tech 23–14)
- (4:07) NCSU – CJ Bailey 1-yard run, Kanoah Vinesett kick (Drive: 6 plays, 75 yards, 2:33; Georgia Tech 23–21)
- (1:30) NCSU – Hollywood Smothers 52-yard run, Kanoah Vinesett kick (Drive: 4 plays, 72 yards, 1:00; NC State 29–23)
- (0:22) GT – Aaron Philo 18-yard run, Aidan Birr kick (Drive: 7 plays, 75 yards, 1:08; Georgia Tech 30–29)

| Statistics | NCSU | GT |
|---|---|---|
| First downs | 16 | 19 |
| Total yards | 400 | 391 |
| Rushing yards | 253 | 119 |
| Passing yards | 147 | 272 |
| Passing: Comp–Att–Int | 17–30–3 | 22–36–1 |
| Time of possession | 26:40 | 33:20 |

| Team | Category | Player | Statistics |
|---|---|---|---|
| NC State | Passing | CJ Bailey | 17/30, 147 yards, 3 INT |
| NC State | Rushing | CJ Bailey | 9 carries, 83 yards, 3 TD |
| NC State | Receiving | Jordan Waters | 3 receptions, 45 yards |
| Georgia Tech | Passing | Aaron Philo | 19/33, 265 yards, INT |
| Georgia Tech | Rushing | Aaron Philo | 7 carries, 57 yards, TD |
| Georgia Tech | Receiving | Eric Singleton Jr. | 5 receptions, 106 yards |

=== at North Carolina ===
NC State Wolfpack (5–6) at North Carolina Tar Heels (6–5) – Game summary

| Quarter | 1 | 2 | 3 | 4 | Total |
|---|---|---|---|---|---|
| Wolfpack | 7 | 0 | 6 | 22 | 35 |
| Tar Heels | 0 | 6 | 14 | 10 | 30 |

at Kenan Stadium • Chapel Hill, NC

- Date: November 30, 2024
- Game time: 3:30 p.m.
- Game weather: Sunny, 45 °F (7 °C)
- Game attendance: 50,500
- Referee: Jerry Magallanes
- TV announcers (ACCN): Chris Cotter (play-by-play), Mark Herzlich (analyst) and Coley Harvey (sideline)

Game information

First quarter
Second quarter
Third quarter
Fourth quarter

| Statistics | NCSU | UNC |
|---|---|---|
| First downs | 27 | 17 |
| Total yards | 462 | 468 |
| Rushing yards | 220 | 193 |
| Passing yards | 242 | 275 |
| Passing: Comp–Att–Int | 14–20–1 | 19–34–0 |
| Time of possession | 35:45 | 24:15 |

| Team | Category | Player | Statistics |
|---|---|---|---|
| NC State | Passing | CJ Bailey | 14/20, 242 yards, 2 TD, 1 INT |
| NC State | Rushing | Hollywood Smothers | 13 carries, 83 yards, 2 TD |
| NC State | Receiving | Dacari Collins | 3 receptions, 62 yards |
| North Carolina | Passing | Jacolby Criswell | 18/33, 273 yards, 3 TD |
| North Carolina | Rushing | Omarion Hampton | 22 carries, 185 yards, 1 TD |
| North Carolina | Receiving | Chris Culliver | 4 receptions, 78 yards, 1 TD |

=== vs. East Carolina (Military Bowl / rivalry) ===
2024 Military Bowl
East Carolina Pirates (7–5) vs. NC State Wolfpack (6–6) – Game summary

| Quarter | 1 | 2 | 3 | 4 | Total |
|---|---|---|---|---|---|
| Pirates | 7 | 6 | 7 | 6 | 26 |
| Wolfpack | 0 | 7 | 0 | 14 | 21 |

at Navy–Marine Corps Memorial Stadium • Annapolis, MD

- Date: December 28, 2024
- Game time: 5:45 p.m.
- Game weather: Cloudy, 47 °F (8 °C)
- Game attendance: 23,981
- Referee: Jon Noli
- TV announcers (ESPN): Jay Alter (play-by-play), Rocky Boiman (analyst), and Alex Chappell (sideline)

Game information

First quarter

- (4:43) ECU – Katin Houser 19-yard run, Noah Perez kick (Drive: 10 plays, 75 yards, 3:55; East Carolina 7–0)

Second quarter

- (6:17) ECU – Noah Perez 24-yard field goal (Drive: 14 plays, 74 yards, 6:17; East Carolina 10–0)
- (1:58) NCSU – Dacari Collins 8-yard pass from CJ Bailey, Kanoah Vinesett kick (Drive: 11 plays, 78 yards, 5:19; East Carolina 10–7)
- (0:06) ECU – Noah Perez 42-yard field goal (Drive: 11 plays, 51 yards, 1:52; East Carolina 13–7)

Third quarter

- (9:17) ECU – Katin Houser 4-yard run, Noah Perez kick (Drive: 12 plays, 75 yards, 5:43; East Carolina 20–7)

Fourth quarter

- (13:04) NCSU – Justin Joly 15-yard pass from CJ Bailey, Kanoah Vinesett kick (Drive: 9 plays, 72 yards, 3:19; East Carolina 20–14)
- (9:49) NCSU – Hollywood Smothers 33-yard pass from CJ Bailey, Kanoah Vinesett kick (Drive: 3 plays, 60 yards, 1:33; NC State 21–20)
- (1:33) ECU – Rahjai Harris 86-yard run, 2-point pass failed (Drive: 3 plays, 86 yards, 0:26; East Carolina 26–21)

| Statistics | ECU | NCSU |
|---|---|---|
| First downs | 22 | 21 |
| Total yards | 473 | 428 |
| Rushing yards | 326 | 198 |
| Passing yards | 147 | 230 |
| Passing: Comp–Att–Int | 18–29–2 | 19–26–1 |
| Time of possession | 26:37 | 33:23 |

| Team | Category | Player | Statistics |
|---|---|---|---|
| East Carolina | Passing | Katin Houser | 18/29, 147 yards, 2 INT |
| East Carolina | Rushing | Rahjai Harris | 17 carries, 221 yards, 1 TD |
| East Carolina | Receiving | Yannick Smith | 3 receptions, 56 yards |
| NC State | Passing | CJ Bailey | 19/26, 230 yards, 3 TD, 1 INT |
| NC State | Rushing | Hollywood Smothers | 15 carries, 142 yards |
| NC State | Receiving | Noah Rogers | 5 receptions, 59 yards |

== Rankings ==
Ranking movements Legend: ██ Increase in ranking ██ Decrease in ranking — = Not ranked RV = Received votes
| | Week | | | | | | | | | | | | | | | | |
| Poll | Pre | 1 | 2 | 3 | 4 | 5 | 6 | 7 | 8 | 9 | 10 | 11 | 12 | 13 | 14 | 15 | Final |
|---|---|---|---|---|---|---|---|---|---|---|---|---|---|---|---|---|---|
| AP | 24 | 24 | — | — | — | — | — | — | — | — | — | — | — | — | — | — | — |
| Coaches | 22 | 23 | RV | RV | — | — | — | — | — | — | — | — | — | — | — | — | — |
| CFP | Not released | | | | | | | | | | — | — | — | — | — | — | Not released |
