= Kyle McCord =

American football player (born 2002)

- McCord with the Syracuse Orange in 2024

No. 14 – Miami Dolphins
- Position: Quarterback
- Roster status: Active

Personal information
- Born: September 19, 2002 (age 24); Mount Laurel, New Jersey, U.S.
- Listed height: 6 ft 3 in (1.91 m)
- Listed weight: 218 lb (99 kg)

Career information
- High school: St. Joseph's Prep (Philadelphia)
- College: Ohio State (2021–2023); Syracuse (2024)
- NFL draft: 2025: 6th round, 181st overall pick

Career history
- Philadelphia Eagles (2025)*; Green Bay Packers (2026)*; Miami Dolphins (2026–present)
- * Offseason or practice squad member only

Awards and highlights
- NCAA passing yards leader (2024); Second-team All-ACC (2024); Third-team All-Big Ten (2023)

Career NFL statistics as of Week 10, 2026
- Passing attempts: 32
- Passing completions: 17
- Completion percentage: 53.1%
- TD–INT: 0–0
- Passing yards: 209
- Passer rating: 73.6
- Stats at Pro Football Reference

Kyle Allen McCord (born September 19, 2002) is an American professional football quarterback for the Miami Dolphins of the National Football League (NFL). He played college football for the Ohio State Buckeyes and Syracuse Orange. McCord was selected by the Philadelphia Eagles in the sixth round of the 2025 NFL draft. He has also been a member of the Green Bay Packers.

== Early life ==
McCord grew up in Mount Laurel, New Jersey and attended St. Joseph's Preparatory School in Philadelphia, Pennsylvania, where he was teammates with future fellow Buckeye Marvin Harrison Jr. He received his first college scholarship offer from Central Michigan before the start of his freshman year of high school. As a sophomore, he passed for a school-record 2,883 yards and 35 touchdown passes. McCord passed for 2,399 yards and 31 touchdowns during his junior season before missing the final four games due to injury. He was named the Pennsylvania Gatorade Player of the Year as a senior after completing 65 percent of his passes while throwing for 1,582 yards and 21 touchdowns. McCord finished his high school career with 6,887 passing yards, a Philadelphia Catholic League record, and 88 touchdown passes.

McCord was initially rated a four-star recruit and committed to play college football at Ohio State during his sophomore year over offers from Texas A&M, Penn State, Mississippi State, and Michigan State. He was later reranked as a five-star prospect by 247Sports as a junior.

== College career ==
=== Ohio State ===
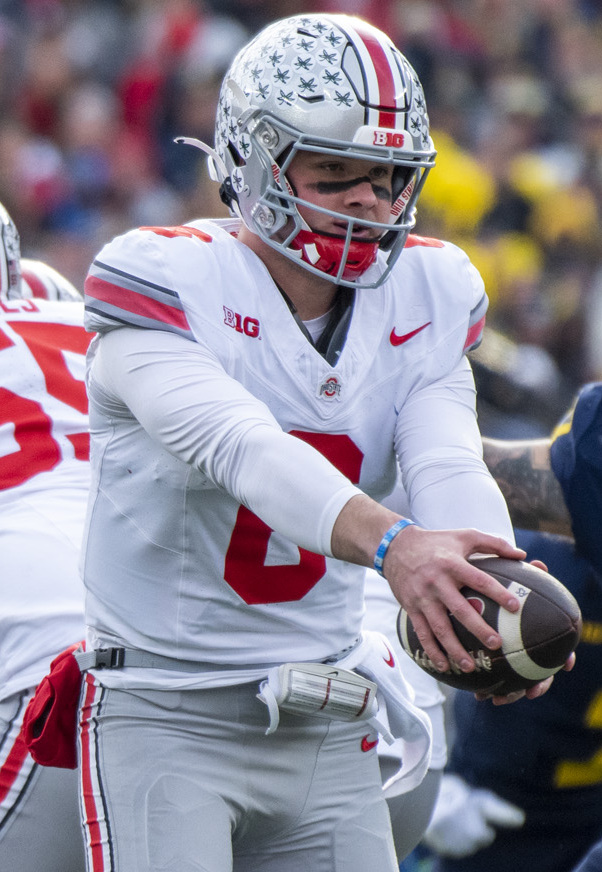
McCord at Ohio State in 2023

McCord primarily spent his freshman season at Ohio State as the backup to starter C. J. Stroud. He made one start against Akron while Stroud was recovering from a shoulder injury. In the game, McCord completed 13 of 18 passing attempts for 319 yards and two touchdowns with one interception in a 59–7 win and was named the Big Ten Conference Freshman of the Week. He finished the season with 416 passing yards and two touchdown passes and two interceptions in five games played. McCord entered his sophomore season as the Buckeyes second-string quarterback. He appeared in seven games, all off the bench, and completed 16 of 20 pass attempts for 190 yards and one touchdown.

McCord competed with Devin Brown during spring practices and preseason training camp to succeed Stroud as Ohio State's starting quarterback in 2023. He was named the starter for the Buckeyes' season opener, although head coach Ryan Day stated that the competition was still ongoing. After completing 14 of 20 pass attempts for 258 yards and three touchdowns in a 35–7 victory in week 2 vs Youngstown State, McCord was named the starter for the rest of the 2023 season. In Week 4 against Notre Dame, McCord led a game-winning drive in the final two minutes as Ohio State won, 17–14. In Week 13 against the Michigan Wolverines, McCord threw for 271 yards and 2 touchdowns, but also threw a game-ending interception on Ohio State's final drive to Rod Moore as Ohio State lost, 30–24.

Prior to Ohio State’s 2023 Cotton Bowl Classic appearance, McCord entered the NCAA transfer portal, following Ryan Day's declining to say if McCord would start the team’s bowl game or to commit to McCord as the starting quarterback for the following season.

=== Syracuse ===
On December 17, 2023, McCord announced that he would be transferring to Syracuse. At Syracuse, McCord joined incoming head coach Fran Brown, whom he has known since his playing days in little league football. Brown flew to Columbus the day McCord entered the transfer portal to visit him in his apartment. McCord had played youth football in front of Jeff Nixon, who would be the incoming offensive coordinator at Syracuse and had worked with quarterbacks coach Nunzio Campanile. He would become teammates with Will Nixon, Fadil Diggs, Duce Chestnut, and Denis Jaquez Jr., with whom he had either played youth football or attended camps with.

McCord signed an agreement with SU Football NIL, has a weekly radio show titled "The Kyle McCord Show", and has his own flavor of potato chips with the Terrell's brand.

Syracuse ended the regular season with a 9–3 winning record, with ranked wins over Georgia Tech, UNLV, and Miami.

McCord broke multiple single-season all-time program records in his lone season with the Orange. McCord's 29 passing touchdown eclipsed Ryan Nassib's 26 in the 2012 season. He threw 300 yards or more in 11 games of the 12, missing only against Virginia Tech where he threw for 280. His 470 yards performance against UConn was second highest in team history, only behind Nassib's 482 yards against Northwestern in 2012. In the final regular season game against 6th-ranked Miami, McCord threw for 380 yards and became program’s first 4,000-yard passer with 4,326 yards. He was named ACC Player of the Week for the ranked win over Georgia Tech in his first conference game. For his performance against Miami, McCord was named AP national Player of the week, as well as Maxwell & Davey O'Brien Player of the Week.

On November 18, 2024, McCord accepted his invitation to the 100th East–West Shrine Bowl.

McCord was ranked No. 1 nationally in the regular season in total passing yards (4,326), passing attempts (558), completions (367), completions per game (30.58), and passing yards per contest (360). He was fourth in passing touchdowns (29). McCord was named to the second-team all ACC. McCord was a finalist for Manning Award, named to the Davey O'Brien Quarterback Class, Davey O'Brien Great 8, and Golden Arm Award Top-25.

McCord finished 10th in the final Heisman Trophy voting. This represents the best finish for an Orange player since Dwight Freeney finished ninth in 2001.

In the 2024 Holiday Bowl 52–35 win against Washington State, McCord finished the game with 5 passing touchdowns and 453 yards to put his season total at 4,779. With this, he passed Deshaun Watson's ACC single season passing yards record of 4,593 yards set in the 2016 season with Clemson. On January 10, 2025, McCord declared for the 2025 NFL draft.

=== Statistics ===
Legend
	Led the NCAA
**Bold**	Career high

Season	Team	Games			Passing								Rushing			
Season	Team	GP	GS	Record	Cmp	Att	Pct	Yds	Avg	TD	Int	Rtg	Att	Yds	Avg	TD
2021	Ohio State	5	1	1–0	25	38	65.8	416	**10.9**	2	2	164.6	9	−16	−1.8	0
2022	Ohio State	7	0	0–0	16	20	**80.0**	190	9.5	1	0	**176.3**	3	**4**	**1.3**	0
2023	Ohio State	12	12	**11–1**	229	348	66.4	3,170	9.1	24	6	163.2	32	−65	−2.0	0
2024	Syracuse	**13**	**13**	10–3	**391**	**592**	66.0	**4,779**	8.1	**34**	**12**	148.8	**67**	−65	−1.0	**3**
Career		37	26	22–4	661	998	66.2	8,555	8.6	61	20	154.4	111	-142	-1.3	3

== Professional career ==
Pre-draft measurables
Height	Weight	Arm length	Hand span	Wingspan
6 ft 3 in (1.91 m)	218 lb (99 kg)	31 in (0.79 m)	9 1/2 in (0.24 m)	6 ft 2 1/2 in (1.89 m)
All values from NFL Combine

=== Philadelphia Eagles ===
McCord was selected by the Philadelphia Eagles with the 181st pick in the sixth round of the 2025 NFL draft. McCord was waived by the Eagles on August 25. Two days later, he was re-signed to the team's practice squad.

=== Green Bay Packers ===
On January 20, 2026, McCord signed a reserve/futures contract with the Green Bay Packers.

=== Miami Dolphins ===
On August 30, 2026, the Packers traded McCord to the Miami Dolphins in exchange for a 2028 sixth-round pick, replacing Quinn Ewers as the backup quarterback, who was traded to the Jacksonville Jaguars the day prior. After starter Malik Willis was placed on the IR with a groin injury, he was named the starter for Week 10 against the Indianapolis Colts. In his first start, McCord threw 17 for 32, a completion percentage of 53.1%, 209 passing yards, a lost fumble which led to a defensive touchdown in the end zone, and a rushing touchdown as the Dolphins lost to the Colts, 24–22.

== Personal life ==
McCord's father, Derek McCord, played quarterback at Rutgers from 1988 to 1992.
