= Oronde Gadsden II =

American football player (born 2003)

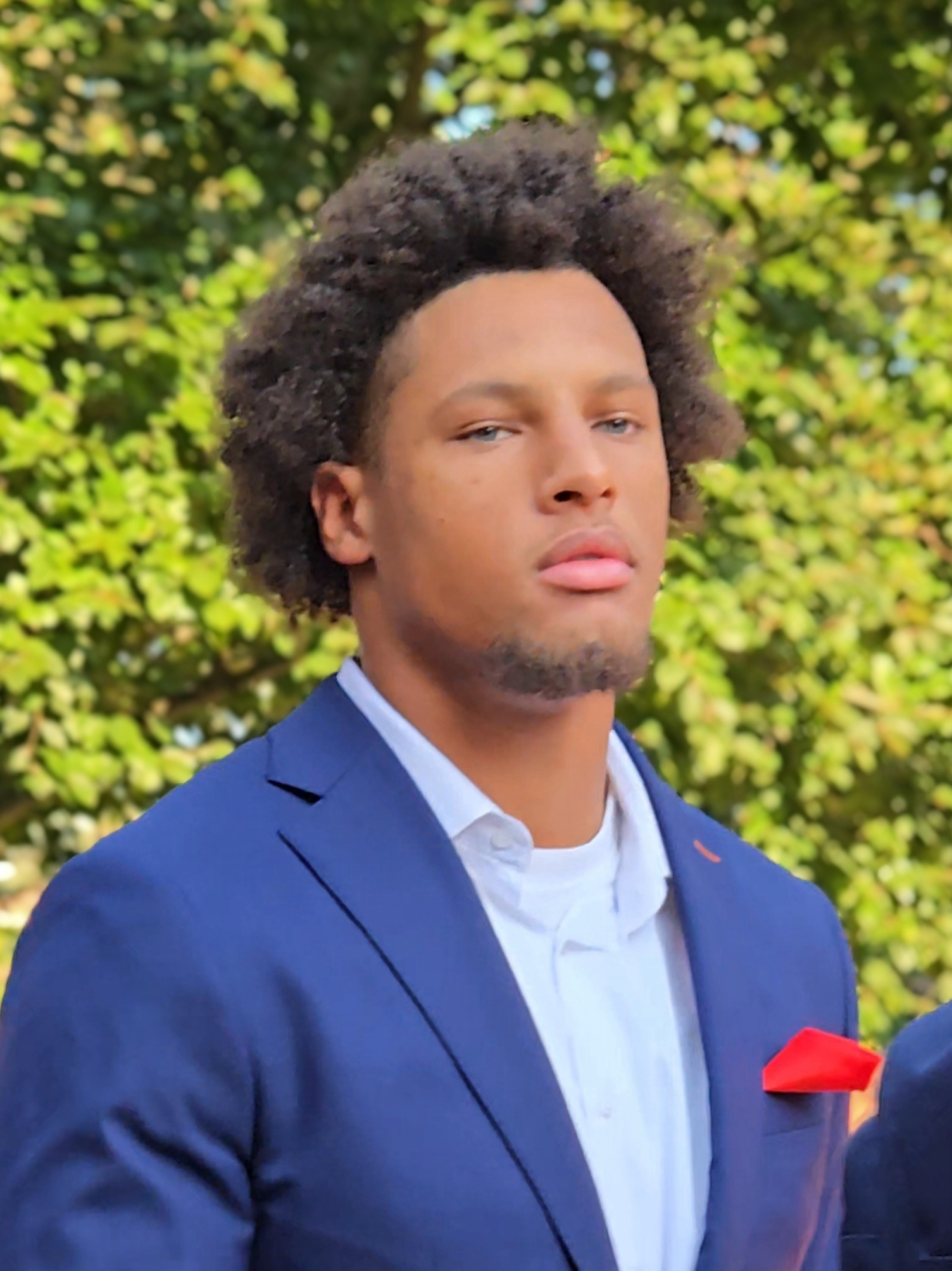
- Gadsden with the Syracuse Orange in 2024

No. 86 – Los Angeles Chargers
- Position: Tight end
- Roster status: Active

Personal information
- Born: June 25, 2003 (age 23); Fort Lauderdale, Florida, U.S.
- Listed height: 6 ft 5 in (1.96 m)
- Listed weight: 236 lb (107 kg)

Career information
- High school: American Heritage (Plantation, Florida)
- College: Syracuse (2021–2024)
- NFL draft: 2025: 5th round, 165th overall pick

Career history
- Los Angeles Chargers (2025–present)

Career NFL statistics as of Week 10, 2026
- Receptions: 69
- Receiving yards: 843
- Receiving touchdowns: 4
- Stats at Pro Football Reference

Oronde Benjamin Gadsden II (born June 25, 2003) is an American professional football tight end for the Los Angeles Chargers of the National Football League (NFL). He played college football for the Syracuse Orange and was selected by the Chargers in the fifth round of the 2025 NFL draft.

== Early life ==
Gadsden was born on June 25, 2003, in Fort Lauderdale, Florida to Oronde and Bianke Gadsden. He attended American Heritage in Plantation, Florida, and played varsity football for head coach Patrick Surtain. As a wide receiver Gadsden recorded 37 receptions for 608 yards and 13 touchdowns. He helped American Heritage win two state championships and he was voted team captain in 2020. He was rated a three-star recruit wide receiver. He is a former lacrosse player and also ran track. His personal best time in the 110 Hurdles was 15.13 and in the 300 Hurdles 38.44.

== College career ==
Gadsden committed to Syracuse University to play college football over offers from Penn State, Baylor, Kentucky, and others. While at Syracuse, he majored in economics at the Maxwell School of Citizenship and Public Affairs.

As a true freshman with the Orange in 2021, Gadsden played in eight games, mostly on special teams, and had two receptions for 24 yards.

Gadsden entered 2022 as both a wide receiver and a tight end. In Robert Anae's pass-heavy offense, Gadsden moved from outside receiver to a hybrid of slot receiver and tight end. He was asked to block more and make catches in the middle of the field. The move paid off for Gadsden, who was named First Team All-ACC after recording 61 receptions for 969 yards and six touchdowns. The reception total is the single season total record for a Syracuse sophomore. Playing against NC State on October 15, 2022, Gadsden earned ACC Receiver of the Week honors, as he hauled in eight passes for 141 yards and 2 touchdowns. At season's end, Gadsden was given the Bill Maxwell Award as the most improved player in the Syracuse offense.

During the off-season, Gadsden declined a name, image and likeness (NIL) linked transfer deal because he wanted to stay and "make a name for [him]self at Syracuse".

In 2023, Gadsden only appeared in two games. He caught six passes for 97 yards and one touchdown before suffering a season-ending injury.

As a redshirt junior in 2024, Gadsden started 13 games. He recorded 73 receptions for 934 yards and seven touchdowns. He also rushed the ball once for 12 yards. His 73 receptions were a school record for a tight end.

=== College statistics ===
Year	Team	Games	Receiving			
Year	Team	GP	Rec	Yds	Avg	TD
2021	Syracuse	8	2	24	12.0	0
2022	Syracuse	13	61	969	15.9	6
2023	Syracuse	2	7	67	9.6	1
2024	Syracuse	13	73	934	12.8	7
Career		36	143	1,994	13.9	14

== Professional career ==
Pre-draft measurables
Height	Weight	Arm length	Hand span	Wingspan	40-yard dash	10-yard split	20-yard split	Vertical jump	Broad jump	Bench press
6 ft 4 5/8 in (1.95 m)	243 lb (110 kg)	33 3/8 in (0.85 m)	10 in (0.25 m)	6 ft 9 5/8 in (2.07 m)	4.59 s	1.72 s	2.73 s	34.5 in (0.88 m)	9 ft 9 in (2.97 m)	19 reps
All values from NFL Combine/Pro Day

Gadsden was selected in the fifth round (165th overall) of the 2025 NFL draft by the Los Angeles Chargers.

Gadsden made his NFL debut in Week 3, amassing 46 receiving yards on five catches. He was named the NFL Rookie of the Week in Week 8 for another 5 reception day, with 77 yards and a touchdown. He finished the 2025 season with 49 receptions for 664 yards and three touchdowns.

== NFL career statistics ==
=== Regular season ===
Year	Team	Games		Receiving				
Year	Team	GP	GS	Rec	Yds	Y/R	Lng	TD
2025	LAC	15	7	49	664	13.6	53	3
2026	LAC	9	4	20	179	9.0	26	1
Career		24	11	69	843	12.2	53	4

== Personal life ==
His father, Oronde Gadsden, played six seasons in the NFL as a wide receiver with the Miami Dolphins. He is one of two children, the other being his sister.
