= Jeff Nixon (American football coach) =

American football coach (born 1974)

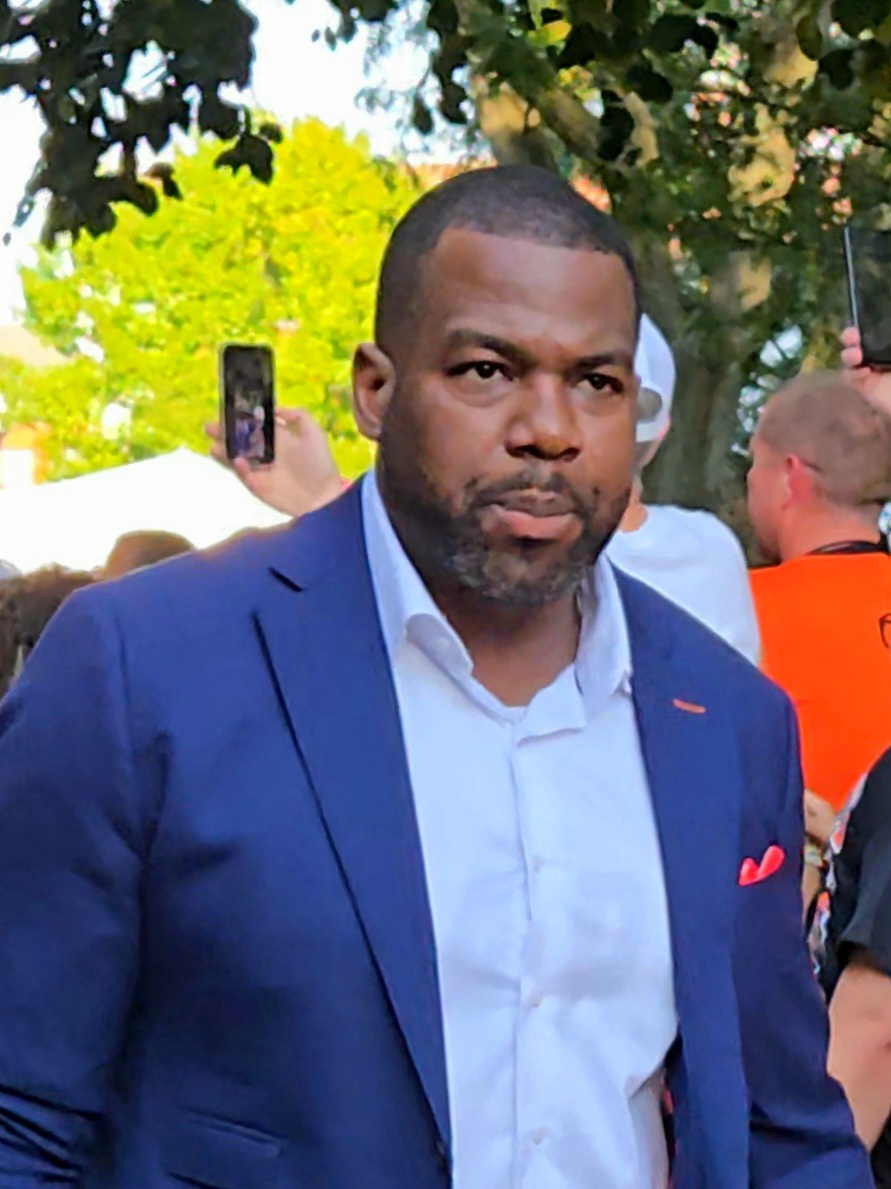
- Nixon with the Syracuse Orange in 2024

Syracuse Orange
- Title: Offensive coordinator

Personal information
- Born: October 16, 1974 (age 52); Rochester, Pennsylvania, U.S.

Career information
- High school: State College (PA)
- College: Penn State

Career history
- Penn State (1997) Graduate assistant; Princeton (1998) Running backs coach; Shippensburg (1999–2002) Running backs coach; Chattanooga (2003–2005) Running backs coach, tight ends coach & special teams coach; Temple (2006) Running backs coach & wide receivers coach; Philadelphia Eagles (2007–2010) Offensive assistant & special teams assistant; Miami Dolphins (2011–2015) Running backs coach; San Francisco 49ers (2016) Tight ends coach; Baylor (2017–2019) Co-offensive coordinator & running backs coach; Carolina Panthers (2020) Running backs coach; Carolina Panthers (2021) Running backs coach & interim offensive coordinator; Carolina Panthers (2022) Assistant head coach offense; New York Giants (2023) Running backs coach; Syracuse (2024–present) Offensive coordinator & running backs coach
- Coaching profile at Pro Football Reference

Jeff Nixon (born October 16, 1974) is an American former football player. He currently is the offensive coordinator and running backs coach for the Syracuse Orange.

== Education & college career ==
He played college football at West Virginia from 1993 to 1994 before transferring to Penn State, where he earned Dean's List and Big Ten Conference All-Academic Team recognition. Nixon earned a degree in elementary education from Penn State in 1998 before receiving his master's degree in education administration from Shippensburg in 2003.

== Career ==
Nixon began his coaching career in 1997 as a student assistant coach at Penn State. He was running backs coach at Princeton in 1998. Nixon served as running backs coach at Shippensburg from 1999 to 2002 under Rocky Rees. From 2003 to 2005, he coached at Tennessee-Chattanooga, where he worked with the running backs, tight ends and as a special teams coordinator and recruiting coordinator. Nixon served as the running backs coach at Temple University in 2006. He was promoted to coach wide receivers after the season. Nixon also spent the four seasons 2007–2010 with the Philadelphia Eagles coaching staff where he was an assistant coach working with the special teams as well as the offense, with a focus on the running back position. Nixon was hired by the Miami Dolphins after being named running backs coach in 2011, coaching for them until 2015.

In 2016, he was hired by the San Francisco 49ers to coach the tight ends position.

In 2017, Nixon became the co-offensive coordinator/play-caller and running backs coach for the Baylor Bears under Matt Rhule for the next three years. In the 2018 season, Baylor averaged 460 yards of total offense (including 290 yards passing per game), ranking in the Top 20, in the country, in both total offense and total passing. In the 2019 season, the Nixon led offense averaged 36 points per game (17th in the country) and helped guide Baylor to a Top 10 rank and a Sugar Bowl berth playing against the Georgia Bulldogs.

=== Panthers ===
In 2020, Nixon joined the Carolina Panthers as the team's running backs coach / senior offensive assistant under Rhule. Nixon became the offensive coordinator for the Panthers after Joe Brady was fired on December 5, 2021. In 2022 he became the assistant head coach for the offense for the Panthers. He was not retained by the Panthers for the 2023 season.

=== New York Giants ===
On February 24, 2023, the New York Giants hired Nixon as their running backs coach.

=== Syracuse ===
In December 2023, Nixon joined Syracuse as offensive coordinator under new head coach Fran Brown for the 2024 season.
