= Jackson Meeks =

American football player (born 2003)

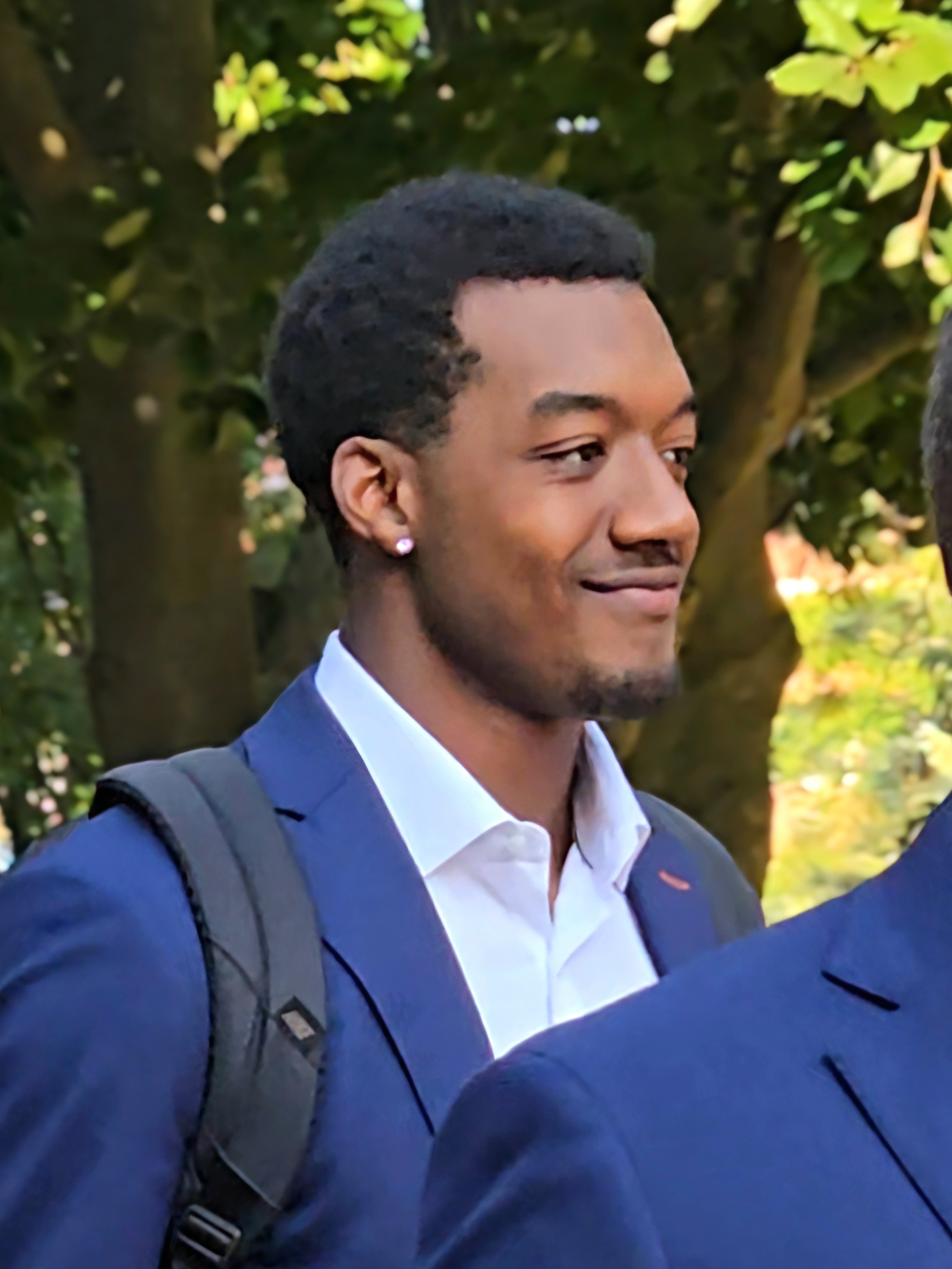
- Meeks at Syracuse University in 2024

No. 13 – Detroit Lions
- Position: Tight end
- Roster status: Practice squad

Personal information
- Born: March 24, 2003 (age 23); Phenix City, Alabama, U.S.
- Listed height: 6 ft 2 in (1.88 m)
- Listed weight: 235 lb (107 kg)

Career information
- High school: Central (Phenix City)
- College: Georgia (2021–2023); Syracuse (2024)
- NFL draft: 2025: undrafted

Career history
- Detroit Lions (2025–present)

Awards and highlights
- 2× CFP national champion (2021, 2022); Second-team All-ACC (2024)

Career NFL statistics as of 2026
- Receptions: 1
- Receiving yards: 8
- Stats at Pro Football Reference

Jackson Malachi Meeks (born March 24, 2003) is an American professional football tight end for the Detroit Lions of the National Football League (NFL). He played college football for the Georgia Bulldogs and Syracuse Orange. Meeks signed with the Lions as an undrafted free agent following the 2025 NFL Draft.

== Early life ==
Meeks attended Central High School in Phenix City, Alabama. He was rated as a three-star recruit and committed to play college football for the Georgia Bulldogs over offers from schools such as Ole Miss, South Alabama, and West Virginia.

== College career ==
=== Georgia ===
In his first three collegiate seasons from 2021 to 2023, Meeks played in 36 games and he hauled in ten receptions for 132 yards, while also making five tackles. After the 2023 season, he entered his name into the NCAA transfer portal.

=== Syracuse ===
Meeks transferred to play for the Syracuse Orange. In week 5 of the 2024 season, he hauled in ten receptions for 161 yards and a touchdown in a win over Holy Cross, and was named the Atlantic Coast Conference (ACC) receiver of the week. In week 7, Meeks notched 11 receptions for 116 yards and a touchdown in a win over NC State, once again earning ACC receiver of the week honors. At the end of the collegiate year, Meeks was selected second-team All-ACC.

== Professional career ==
Pre-draft measurables
Height	Weight	Arm length	Hand span	Wingspan	40-yard dash	10-yard split	20-yard split	20-yard shuttle	Three-cone drill	Vertical jump	Broad jump	Bench press
6 ft 1 7/8 in (1.88 m)	213 lb (97 kg)	32 in (0.81 m)	9 5/8 in (0.24 m)	6 ft 4 3/4 in (1.95 m)	4.65 s	1.62 s	2.72 s	4.25 s	6.79 s	34.5 in (0.88 m)	10 ft 0 in (3.05 m)	15 reps
All values from Pro Day

Meeks signed with the Detroit Lions as an undrafted free agent on May 9, 2025. He was waived on August 26 as part of final roster cuts, and re-signed to the practice squad. Meeks signed a reserve/future contract with Detroit on January 5, 2026.

During the 2026 offseason program, Meeks was converted to the tight end position from wide receiver, gaining 25 pounds in the process. On November 9, he was waived and re-signed to the practice squad two days later.

== Personal life ==
Meeks is the nephew of the current Atlanta Falcons pass rusher Za'Darius Smith.
