= Noah Rogers =

American football player

No. 5 – Alabama Crimson Tide
- Position: Wide receiver
- Class: Redshirt Senior

Personal information
- Listed height: 6 ft 2 in (1.88 m)
- Listed weight: 201 lb (91 kg)

Career information
- High school: Rolesville (Rolesville, North Carolina)
- College: Ohio State (2023); NC State (2024–2025); Alabama (2026–present)
- Stats at ESPN

Noah Rogers is an American football wide receiver for the Alabama Crimson Tide. He previously played for the NC State Wolfpack and for the Ohio State Buckeyes.

== Early life ==
Rogers grew up in Raleigh, North Carolina, and attended Rolesville High School in Rolesville, North Carolina. He was rated as a four-star recruit and the 57th overall prospect in the class of 2023 by ESPN, and committed to play college football for the Ohio State Buckeyes over offers from Alabama, Clemson, North Carolina, and NC State.

== College career ==
=== Ohio State ===
As a freshman in 2023, Rogers played in two games and was redshirted. After the conclusion of the season, he entered the NCAA transfer portal.

=== NC State ===
Rogers transferred to play for the NC State Wolfpack. In 2024, he recorded 35 receptions for 478 yards and a touchdown in 13 games. Rogers finished the 2025 season with 33 catches for 441 yards and two touchdowns. After the season, he once again entered the NCAA transfer portal.

=== Alabama ===
Rogers transferred to play for the Alabama Crimson Tide. He was slated to be a starter for the Crimson Tide, but suffered an injury in the team's spring game causing him to miss the start of the season.
