= Fran Brown =

American football player and coach (born 1982)

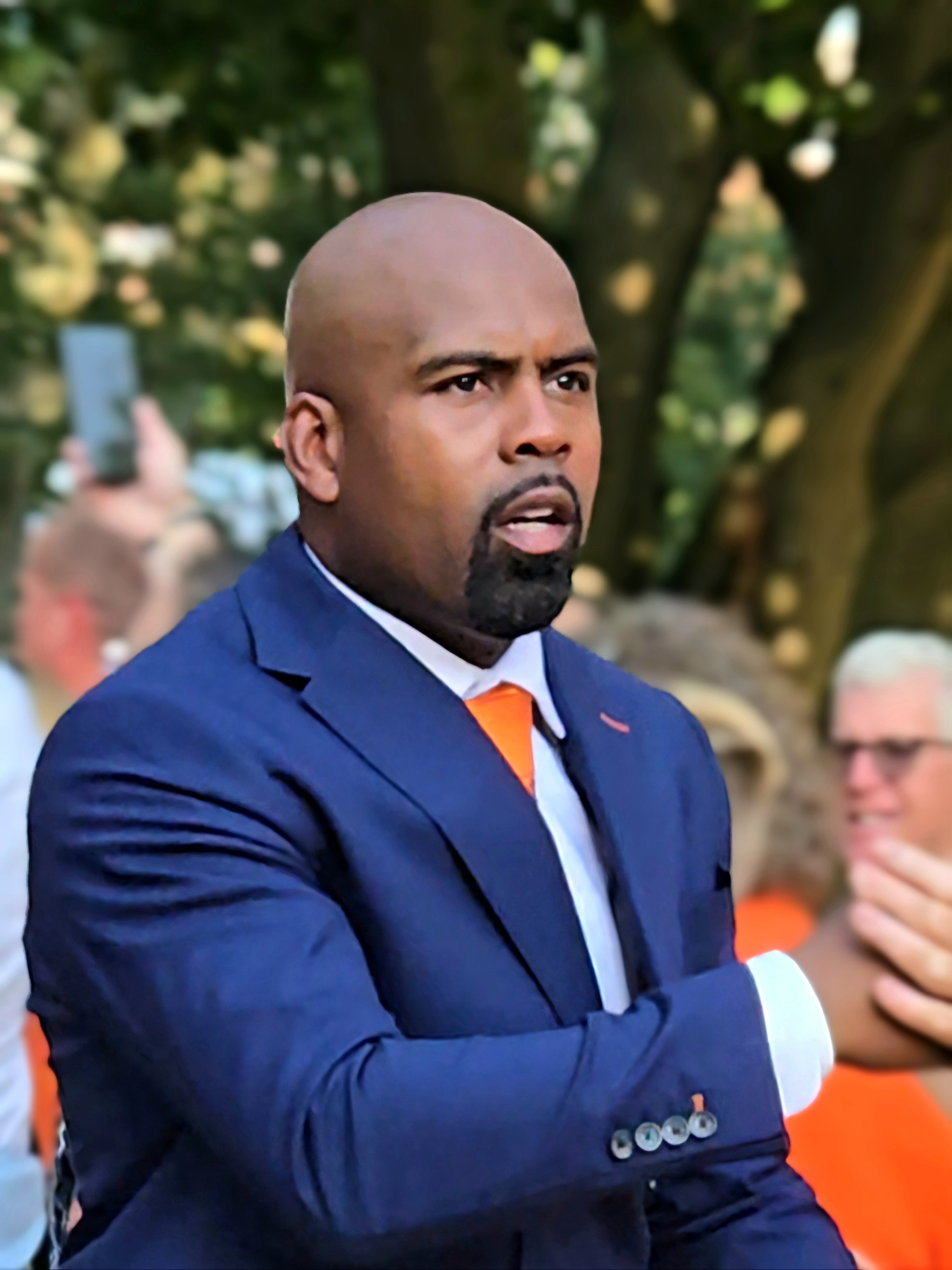
- Brown with the Syracuse Orange in 2024

Current position
- Title: Head coach
- Team: Syracuse
- Conference: ACC
- Record: 18–18

Biographical details
- Born: February 3, 1982 (age 44); Camden, New Jersey, U.S.

Playing career
- 2003–2006: Western Carolina
- 2007–2008: Cincinnati Bengals
- Position: Cornerback

Coaching career (HC unless noted)
- 2010: Paul VI HS (NJ) (DB)
- 2012: Temple (GA)
- 2013–2015: Temple (DB)
- 2016: Temple (AHC/DB)
- 2017–2018: Baylor (AHC/DB)
- 2019: Temple (co-DC/DB)
- 2020–2021: Rutgers (DB)
- 2022–2023: Georgia (DB)
- 2024–present: Syracuse

Administrative career (AD unless noted)
- 2011: Temple (Dir. of Internal Ops)

Head coaching record
- Overall: 18–18

Accomplishments and honors

Awards
- FWAA First-Year Coach of the Year (2024); Paul "Bear" Bryant Newcomer Coach of the Year (2024)

Francis Brown (born February 3, 1982) is an American college football coach and former cornerback who is currently the head football coach at Syracuse University. Previously, he served as the defensive backs coach at Georgia.

== Early life ==
Brown was raised in Camden, New Jersey and graduated from Camden High School, where he set the school record as a quarterback with 47 touchdown passes.

== Playing career ==
Following his high school career at the Woodrow Wilson High School, Brown switched to cornerback and played with Hudson Valley Community College. He was recruited to Western Carolina by then linebackers coach Matt Rhule, and became a first-team All-SoCon selection and team captain. Following his time as a Catamount, Brown spent time with the Cincinnati Bengals during the 2007 and 2008 seasons on the practice squad.

== Coaching career ==
=== Temple ===
After spending a year coaching at Paul VI High School, Brown joined Steve Addazio's staff at Temple as the Assistant Director of Internal Operations in 2011. During the 2012 season, Brown transitioned to a graduate assistant role in 2012 before becoming Temple's defensive backs coach on Matt Rhule's staff in 2013. Brown held that role until 2016, when he was added associate head coach responsibilities to his job description.

After the 2014 recruiting season, in which he signed a number of players including future pro Sean Chandler, Brown was named a top recruiter in the American Athletic Conference by Rivals.com.

=== Baylor ===
Brown followed Rhule to Baylor where he served as the Bears' assistant head coach and defensive backs coach for the 2017 and 2018 seasons. During his time in Waco, Brown was considered Baylor's top recruiter.

=== Second stint at Temple ===
Following the 2018 season, Brown interviewed for the head coaching job at Temple that eventually went to Manny Diaz. Diaz's first hire at Temple was to bring Brown in as assistant head coach and co-defensive coordinator. After 17 days, Diaz left Temple to return to Miami for the head coaching job. Brown interviewed for the Temple head coaching job, but it eventually went to Rod Carey. Carey kept Brown on the Owls coaching staff as the co-defensive coordinator.

=== Rutgers ===
After Rutgers brought back coach Greg Schiano for the 2020 season, he hired Brown to be the team’s secondary coach.

=== Georgia ===
On February 18, 2022, Brown was hired to be a part of Georgia’s defensive staff. Brown was hired to replace Jahmile Addae who took the same position at Miami (FL) on Feb. 7. He was part of the coaching staff on the Georgia team that defeated TCU in the National Championship. In 2023, Brown was named #1 national recruiter by 247Sports.

=== Syracuse ===
On November 28, 2023, Brown was named the 31st head coach of Syracuse University. His deep recruiting ties in South Jersey, one of Syracuse’s primary recruiting grounds, were cited as a major reason for his hiring.

Following a September 6, 2025 overtime victory vs. UConn, Brown had the entire Orange squad run wind sprints in full uniform with spectators still inside the JMA Wireless Dome. A video detailing the punishment went viral on the social media platform X.

== Head coaching record ==
Year	Team	Overall	Conference	Standing	Bowl/playoffs	Coaches^{#}	AP^{°}
Syracuse Orange (Atlantic Coast Conference) (2024–present)
2024	Syracuse	10–3	5–3	T–4th	W Holiday	22	20
2025	Syracuse	3–9	1–7	T–16th			
2026	Syracuse	5–6	3–6				
Syracuse:		18–18	9–16				
Total:		18–18					

== Personal life ==
Brown is married to Teara Brown and has three children. Brown once mentioned in a press conference that he often does not shower after his team loses a game, describing showers as a ritual and a motivation for winning (only "winners get washed"). His son, Fran Brown Jr., started his freshman season for the Saint Francis Red Flash football and transferred to Syracuse in December 2024.
