= Frank Maloney (American football) =

American football player (1940–2020)

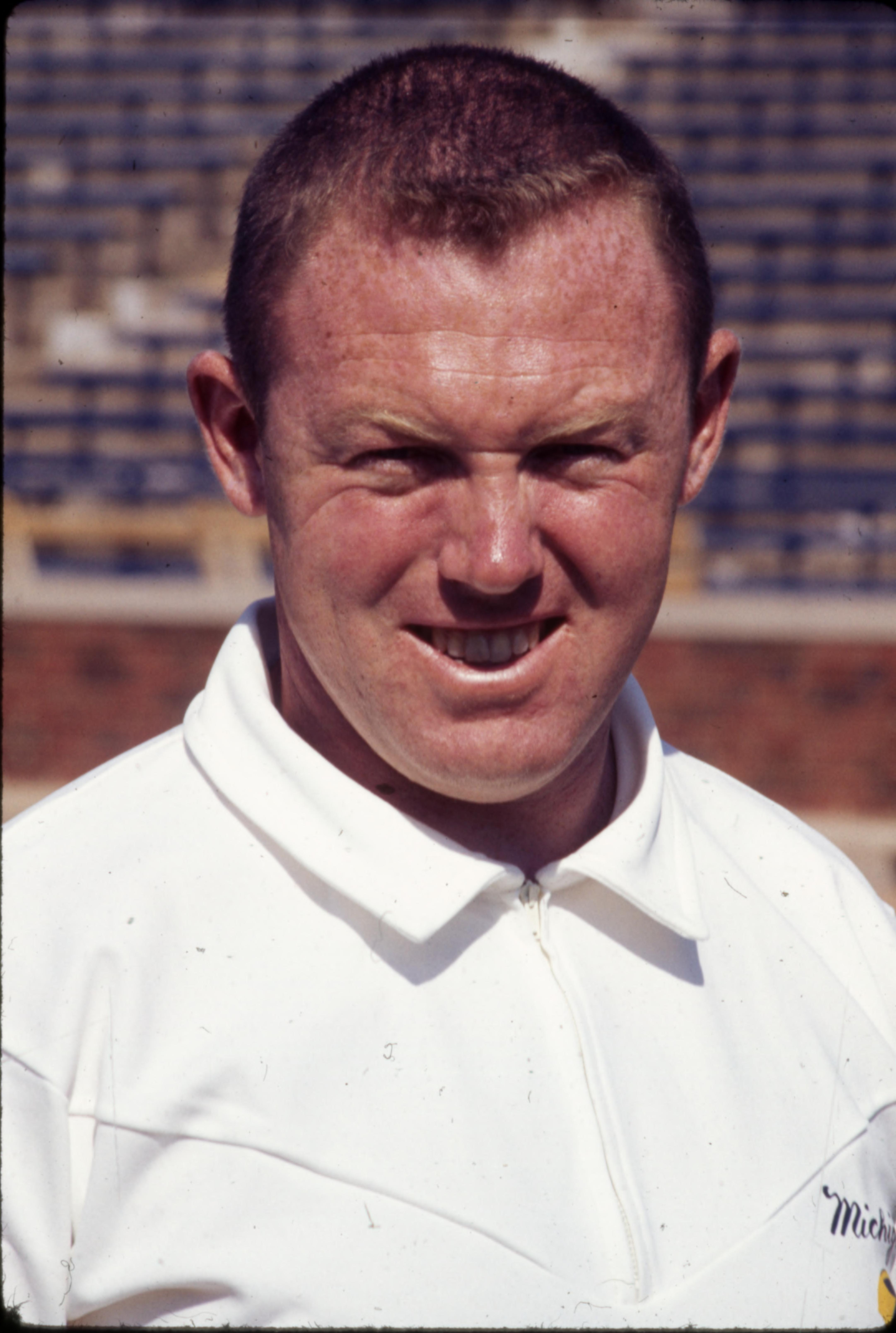
- Maloney in 1969

Biographical details
- Born: September 26, 1940
- Died: March 30, 2020 (aged 79); Chicago, Illinois, U.S.

Playing career
- 1959–1961: Michigan
- Positions: Center, guard

Coaching career (HC unless noted)
- 1968–1973: Michigan (assistant)
- 1974–1980: Syracuse

Head coaching record
- Overall: 32–46
- Bowls: 1–0

Frank Maloney (September 26, 1940 – March 30, 2020) was an American football player and coach. He was the head coach at Syracuse University from 1974 to 1980, succeeding College Football Hall of Fame inductee, Ben Schwartzwalder. Prior to coaching at Syracuse, Maloney was an assistant coach at the University of Michigan under Bump Elliott (1968) and Bo Schembechler (1969–1973). After departing Syracuse he joined the management team for the Chicago Cubs of Major League Baseball.

== Coaching career ==
Maloney's tenure at Syracuse was marked by inconsistency. The fan base turned on him as the Orange failed to achieve the national status they had enjoyed under Schwartzwalder, perhaps, failing to remember that Schwartzwalder's last few seasons were mediocre ones (only one winning season in his last five), and his 1970 team had been stricken by racial unrest. Maloney's program was also limited by archaic facilities. Archbold Stadium, Syracuse's home field since 1907, was in need of replacement. Nonetheless, Maloney did recruit a number of future NFL stars such as Joe Morris and Pro Football Hall of Fame member Art Monk.

Maloney was the subject of criticism, not only from the fans and alumni, but also from the 1959 national championship team, members of which started a campaign calling for his ousting. Ironically enough, this call from program alumni came during the 1979 season, Maloney's best at Syracuse, when the Orangemen qualified for the Independence Bowl, beating McNeese State. Also, Maloney and the 1979 Orangemen bore the burden of playing an entire season on the road, as Archbold Stadium was demolished following the 1978 season, and the Carrier Dome would not be ready until 1980. The 1979 team played "home" games at Rich Stadium in Orchard Park, Schoellkopf Field at Cornell University in Ithaca, and Giants Stadium in East Rutherford, New Jersey.

After coaching the Orangemen for seven seasons and presiding over the opening of the Carrier Dome in 1980, Maloney was fired and replaced by Dick MacPherson.

== Chicago Cubs ==
In 29 seasons in the Chicago Cubs ticket office, including the last 27 as its director, Maloney oversaw nine single-season attendance records, including Wrigley Field's first two-million fan season in 1984 and its first three-million fan season in 2004. Maloney stepped down from his post having helped the Cubs to seven consecutive seasons with three million fans at Wrigley Field starting 2004. Maloney retired at the end of the 2010 calendar year. He remained with the club as a consultant in 2011. He died of brain cancer in Chicago in 2020.

== Head coaching record ==
Year	Team	Overall	Conference	Standing	Bowl/playoffs
Syracuse Orangemen (NCAA Division I/I-A independent) (1974–1980)
1974	Syracuse	2–9			
1975	Syracuse	6–5			
1976	Syracuse	3–8			
1977	Syracuse	6–5			
1978	Syracuse	3–8			
1979	Syracuse	7–5			W Independence
1980	Syracuse	5–6			
Syracuse:		32–46			
Total:		32–46			
