= Syracuse Orange football =

College football team representing Syracuse University, New York

2026 Syracuse Orange football team
- First season: 1889; 137 years ago
- Athletic director: Bryan Blair
- General manager: Thomas Caporale
- Head coach: Fran Brown; 3rd season, 14–14 (.500)
- Location: Syracuse, New York
- Stadium: JMA Wireless Dome (capacity: 42,774)
- NCAA division: Division I FBS
- Conference: ACC
- Colors: Orange
- All-time record: 758–590–49 (.560)
- Bowl record: 17–11–1 (.603)

National championships
- Claimed: 1959

Conference championships
- Big East: 1996, 1997, 1998, 2004, 2012
- Heisman winners: Ernie Davis – 1961
- Consensus All-Americans: 20
- Rivalries: Boston College (rivalry); Pittsburgh (rivalry); Penn State (rivalry); UConn (rivalry); West Virginia (rivalry); Rutgers (rivalry); Colgate (rivalry)

Uniforms
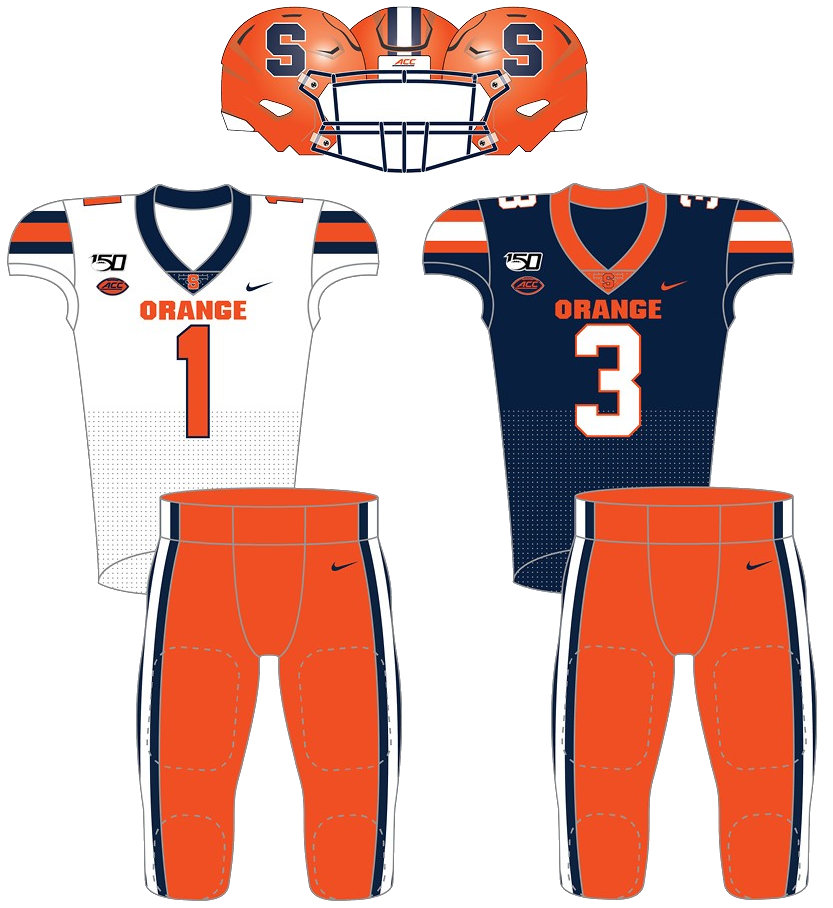
- Fight song: Down the Field
- Mascot: Otto the Orange
- Marching band: Syracuse University Marching Band
- Outfitter: Nike
- Website: Cuse football

The Syracuse Orange football team represents Syracuse University in the Football Bowl Subdivision (FBS) of the National Collegiate Athletic Association (NCAA) as members of the Atlantic Coast Conference (ACC). Syracuse is the only Division I FBS school in New York to compete in one of the Power Four conferences.

The Orange play their home games in the JMA Wireless Dome, referred to as the JMA Dome on the university's campus in Syracuse, New York. The stadium is also known as "The Loud House."

Formed in 1889, the program has amassed over 740 wins and has achieved one consensus national championship in 1959, defeating the Texas Longhorns in that season's Cotton Bowl. Syracuse has had 2 undefeated seasons, 5 conference championships since 1991, and has produced a Heisman Trophy winner, over 60 first team All-Americans, 18 Academic All-Americans and over 240 NFL players. Syracuse has had 20 members inducted into the College Football Hall of Fame, 2nd-most in the ACC, including former players Ernie Davis, Tim Green, Don McPherson, Art Monk and former coaches Vic Hanson, Ben Schwartzwalder, and Dick MacPherson. The Orange boast 9 inductees in the Pro Football Hall Of Fame, tied for the 4th-most of any school, including Jim Brown, Marvin Harrison, Larry Csonka, Floyd Little and Dwight Freeney.

The Orange have 29 bowl appearances, 10 of which are among the New Year's Six Bowls. Syracuse has finished in the Final Top 25 rankings 21 times in the national polls, and finished in either the AP or Coaches Polls a combined 35 times since 1952. Syracuse has appeared in over 200 AP Polls including 7 weeks at AP number one.

== History ==
=== Early history (1889–1948) ===
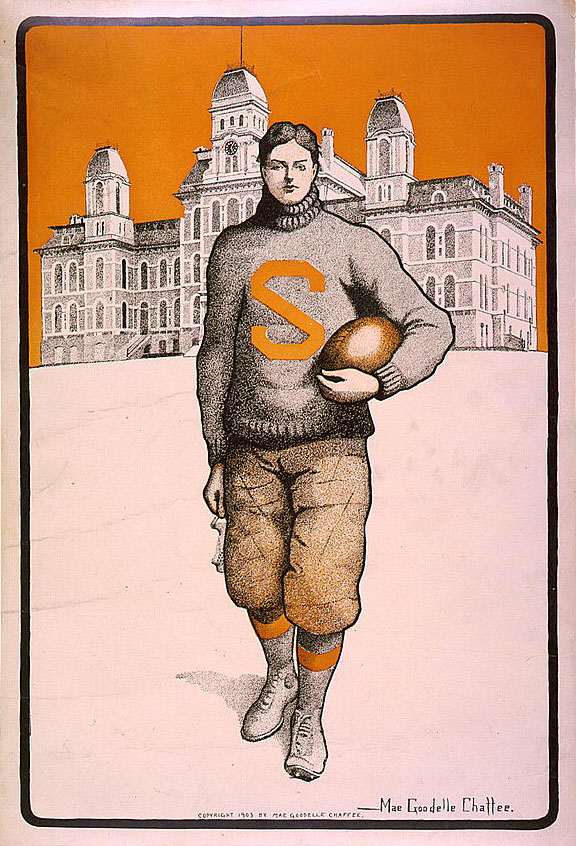
A Syracuse football player with Hall of Languages behind him (c.1903)

Syracuse played its first football game on November 23, 1889, and achieved its first success in the 1890s and 1900s. With the construction of "state-of-the-art" Archbold Stadium in 1907, Syracuse rose to national prominence under College Football Hall of Fame coach Frank "Buck" O'Neill. The 1915 squad garnered a Rose Bowl invitation that the school declined, having already played on the West Coast that season. In 1918, John Barsha (born Abraham Barshofsky) was co‐captain of the 1918 Walter Camp All‐America football team.

The 1920s had continued success with teams featuring two-time All American Doc Alexander and star end Vic Hanson. Vic Hanson was an American football player and coach, basketball player, and baseball player. A three-sport college athlete, he played football, basketball, and baseball at Syracuse in the 1920s, serving as team captain in all three sports. The Watertown, New York native was named a Basketball All-American three times—in 1925, 1926, and 1927—was named the Helms Foundation College Basketball Player of the Year and was a consensus selection to both 1925 and 1926 College Football All-America Teams. Hanson is one of only two individuals who are members (Amos Alonzo Stagg being the other) of both the Basketball Hall of Fame and the College Football Hall of Fame and the only one inducted into the Basketball Hall of Fame, the College Basketball Hall of Fame and the College Football Hall of Fame. He later coached the team from 1930 to 1936.

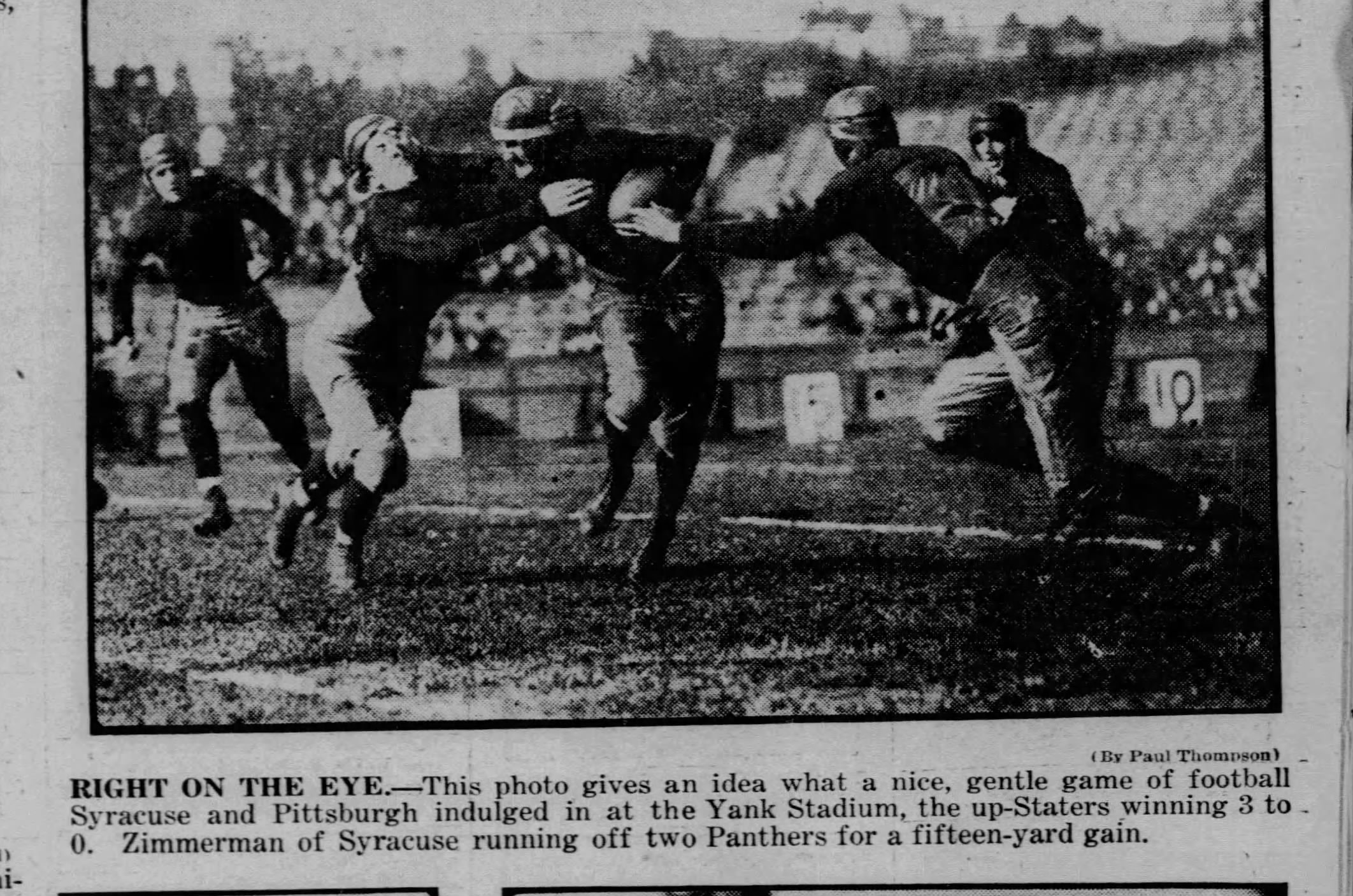
Syracuse playing Pittsburgh at Yankee Stadium in the Bronx, New York City c. October 1923

In the 1930s, Syracuse and nearby Cornell University were among the first collegiate football teams to include African-American players as starting backfield players. Wilmeth Sidat-Singh was an African-American basketball star player for DeWitt Clinton High School. He received an offer of a basketball scholarship from Syracuse University and enrolled in 1935. While playing an intramural football game, an assistant football coach noticed his talent and asked him to join the football team. Sidat-Singh starred for Syracuse, playing a position equivalent to modern-day quarterback. In that era, when games were played in Southern segregation states, African-American players from Northern schools were banned from the field. Because of his light complexion and name, Sidat-Singh was sometimes assumed to be a "Hindu" (as people from India were often called by Americans during this time). However. shortly before a game against Maryland, a black sportswriter, Sam Lacy wrote an article in the Baltimore Afro-American, revealing Sidat-Singh's true racial identity. Wilmeth Sidat-Singh was held out of the game and Syracuse lost that game 0–13. Olympic track athlete Marty Glickman, who played football for Syracuse, believed athletic director Lew Andreas was a bigot who occasionally used a disparaging term for Blacks; the 18-year-old Glickman thought Andreas should have stood up for Sidat-Singh (Glickman also faulted himself for not standing up for Sidat-Singh). In a rematch the following year at Syracuse, Sidat-Singh led the Orange to a lopsided victory (53–0) over Maryland. In 2005, Syracuse University honored Wilmeth Sidat-Singh by retiring his basketball jersey number. On Saturday, Nov. 9, 2013, the University of Maryland publicly apologized to surviving relatives from the Webb family at a ceremony during a football game with Syracuse University.

Ossie Solem coached at Syracuse from 1937 to 1945. During his tenure at Syracuse, he tutored a young assistant coach named Bud Wilkinson, who went on to lead the Oklahoma Sooners to win three national championships.

=== Ben Schwartzwalder era (1949–1973) ===
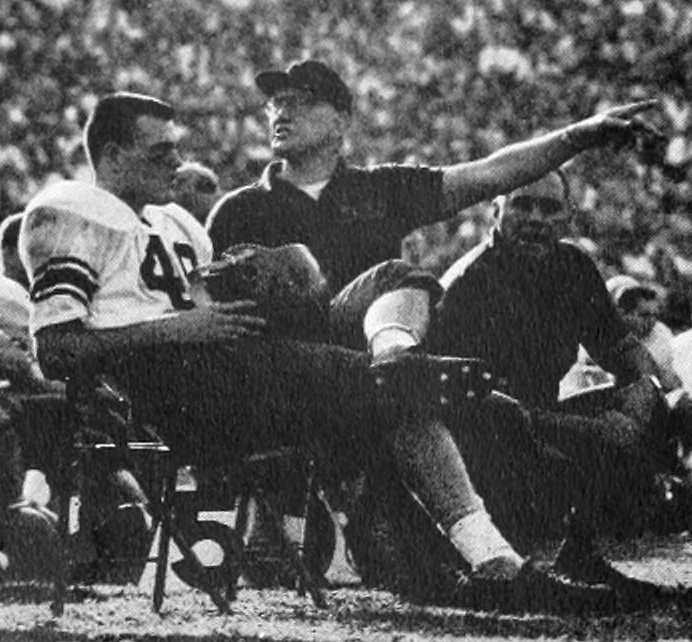
Coach Ben Schwartzwalder and QB Dick Easterly, December 5, 1959 at UCLA.

The late 1930s and 1940s had a decline in fortunes that began to reverse when Ben Schwartzwalder took over as head coach in 1949. Syracuse made its first bowl appearance in the 1953 Orange Bowl, followed by appearances in the 1957 Cotton Bowl and the 1959 Orange Bowl.

Jim Brown (a high school standout from Manhasset, New York), considered to be one of the greatest running backs of all time, as well as one of the greatest players in NFL history, was a consensus first-team All-American in 1956, finished fifth in the Heisman Trophy voting and set school records for highest season rush average (6.2) and most rushing touchdowns in a single game (6). In the Cotton Bowl, Brown rushed for 132 yards, scored three touchdowns, and kicked three extra points, but a blocked extra point after Syracuse's third touchdown was the difference as TCU won 28–27.

In 1959, Syracuse earned its first consensus national championship, finishing No. 1 in both the AP and Coaches' Polls, following an undefeated season (11–0) and Cotton Bowl Classic victory over No. 4 Texas. The team featured sophomore running back Ernie Davis of Elmira, New York, who went on to become the first African American to win the Heisman Trophy in 1961, and All-American tackle Ron Luciano, who eventually become a prominent Major League Baseball umpire. Davis was slated to play for the Cleveland Browns in the same backfield as Jim Brown, but died of leukemia before being able to play professionally. Syracuse remained competitive through the 1960s with a series of All-American running backs, including Floyd Little and Larry Csonka (both inductees in the Pro Football Hall of Fame).

Schwartzwalder produced 22 straight years of non-losing football, took the Orange to seven bowls, won the Lambert-Meadowlands Trophy (to recognize the Eastern champion in Division I FBS) four times: 1952, 1956, 1959, 1966; and won the national championship in 1959. He developed some of the most impressive running backs the game has ever seen – Jim Brown, Ernie Davis, Jim Nance, Floyd Little and Larry Csonka. Orange teams outrushed opponents by more than 22,000 yards under Schwartzwalder. He retired as Syracuse's head coach after the 1973 season, which was Syracuse's third consecutive losing season. Schwartzwalder left Syracuse with a 153–91–3 record.

In 1969, a group of nine African American student-athletes boycotted Syracuse University's football program to demand change and promote racial equality. Popularized erroneously in 1970 by the media as the “Syracuse 8,” the nine students behind the boycott were Gregory Allen, Richard Bulls, Dana Harrell, John Godbolt, John Lobon, Clarence “Bucky” McGill, A. Alif Muhammad (then known as Al Newton), Duane Walker, and Ron Womack. The student athletes drafted a list of four demands, three of which were advocating for the betterment for all student athletes at the university, were access to the same academic tutoring as their white teammates; better medical care for all team members; starting assignments based on merit; and racially integrating the coaching staff, which had been all white since 1898.

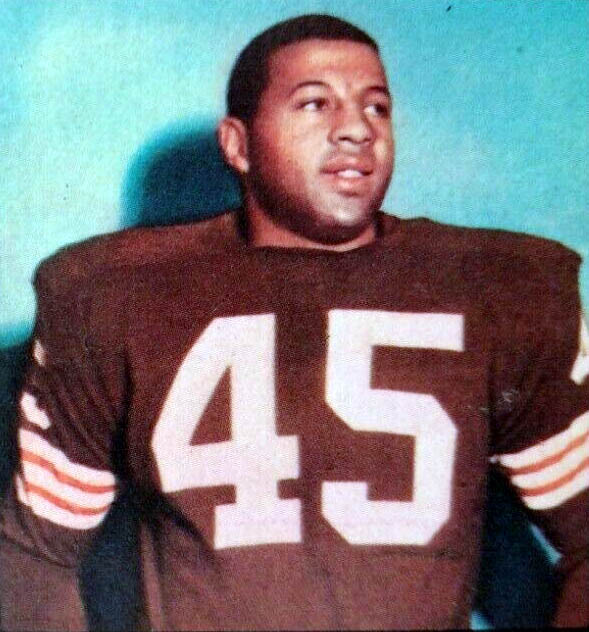
RB Ernie Davis,
first African American to win the Heisman Trophy, played at Syracuse from 1959–1961

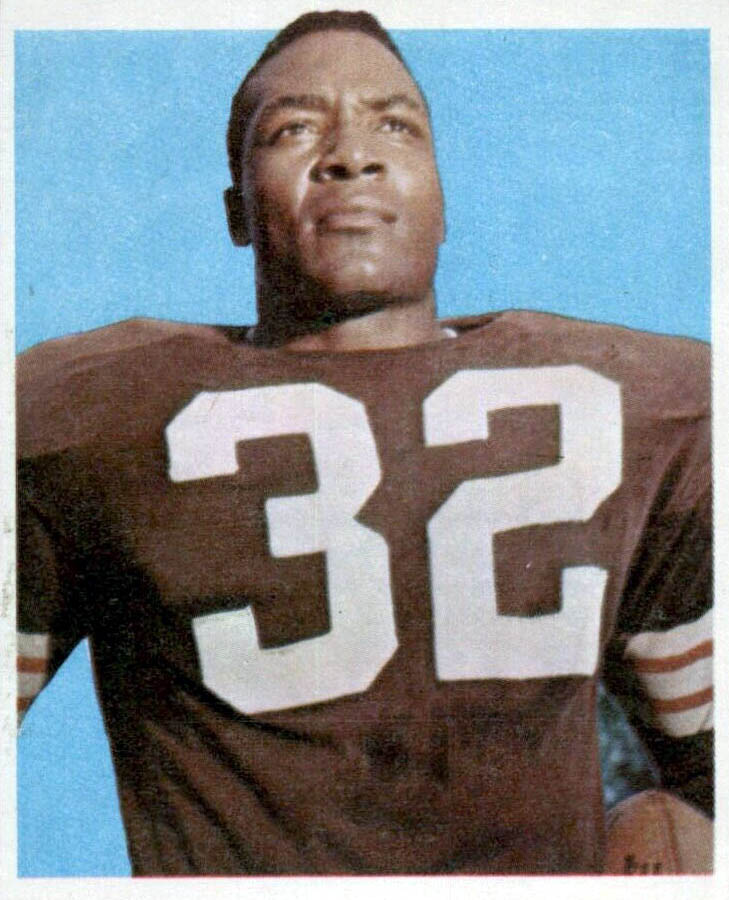
RB Jim Brown,
Pro Football Hall of Famer, played at Syracuse from 1954–1956

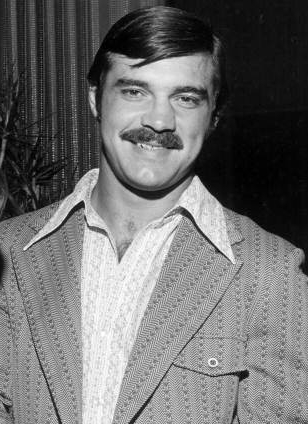
RB Larry Csonka,
Pro Football Hall of Famer, played at Syracuse from 1965–1967

=== Frank Maloney era (1974–1980) ===
Michigan assistant coach Frank Maloney was hired as Schwartzwalder's replacement. Maloney's tenure at Syracuse was marked by inconsistency. The fan base turned on him as the Orange failed to achieve the national status they had enjoyed under Schwartzwalder. Maloney's program was also limited by archaic facilities. Archbold Stadium, Syracuse's home field since 1907, was in need of replacement. Nonetheless, Maloney did recruit a number of future NFL stars such as Joe Morris and Pro Football Hall of Fame member Art Monk.

Maloney was the subject of criticism, not only from the fans and alumni, but also from the 1959 national championship team, members of which started a campaign calling for his ouster. Ironically enough, this call from program alumni came during the 1979 season, Maloney's best at Syracuse, when the Orangemen qualified for the Independence Bowl, beating McNeese State. After coaching the Orangemen for seven seasons and presiding over the opening of a new stadium, the Carrier Dome (renamed in 2022 the JMA Wireless Dome), in 1980, Maloney resigned.

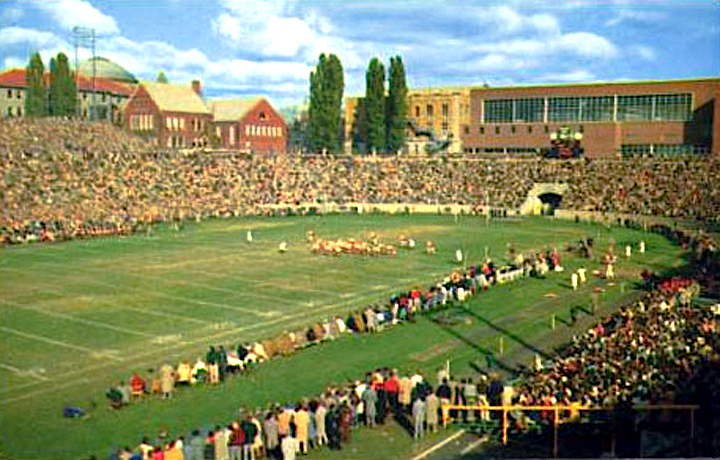
Old Archbold Stadium in 1970s

=== Dick MacPherson era (1981–1990) ===
Dick MacPherson was hired as the head coach in 1981 and after several mediocre seasons, fans wanted MacPherson fired, coining the phrase, "Sack Mac".

However, the fans' opinion of Coach MacPherson changed when the program returned suddenly to national prominence in 1987 with an undefeated 11–0 regular season record. The team featured Maxwell Award-winning quarterback Don McPherson and fullback Daryl Johnston. The team missed an opportunity to play for the NCAA Division I-A national football championship, because both Oklahoma and Miami also finished undefeated that year and finished higher in the polls. Instead, the team faced Southeastern Conference champion Auburn University in the Sugar Bowl. The game ended in a 16–16 tie when Auburn kicked a late field goal rather than trying for a game-winning touchdown. MacPherson left Syracuse after the 1990 season to accept the position of head coach for the NFL's New England Patriots.

McPherson is credited with building a strong recruiting pipeline in the northeast area.

=== Paul Pasqualoni era (1991–2004) ===
Syracuse continued to experience success under MacPherson's successor, Paul Pasqualoni, previously the team's linebackers coach, appearing in 11 bowl games (including three major bowls) and winning 9. The team also captured or shared three Big East football championships during this period.

Prominent players of the period included Donovan McNabb, Marvin Harrison, Dwight Freeney, Keith Bulluck, Rob Moore, Donovin Darius, Qadry Ismail, Kevin Johnson, Rob Konrad, Tebucky Jones, and Marvin Graves. Rivalries shifted in the early 1990s as Penn State ended its series with Syracuse and joined the Big Ten. Syracuse, meanwhile, joined the newly formed Big East football conference with traditional rival West Virginia University, and national power Miami. In 2004, Miami and Virginia Tech left the Big East to join the Atlantic Coast Conference, followed by Boston College in 2005, threatening the stature of the Big East. Syracuse was originally invited to leave the Big East and join the ACC, but under pressure from the Governor of Virginia, the ACC decided to invite Virginia Tech to join the conference, instead. Thus, Syracuse remained in the Big East. Syracuse's streak of winning seasons ended in 2002 when they went 4–8. This was followed by consecutive 6–6 seasons. Although they won a share of the Big East title in 2004 and competed in the Champs Sports Bowl, the teams from 2002 to 2004 were considered mediocre by Syracuse standards. This prompted new athletic director Dr. Daryl Gross to fire Pasqualoni after 14 years at the helm.

=== Greg Robinson era (2005–2008) ===
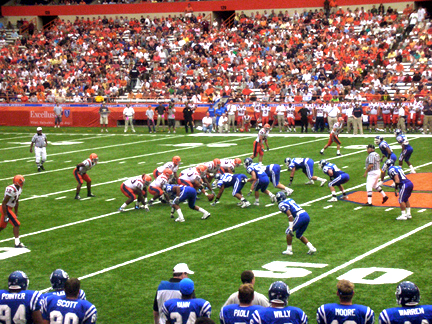
Syracuse playing Buffalo in September 2005

In 2005, the university hired Greg Robinson, defensive coordinator for Texas, as head coach. Robinson installed a new West Coast offense scheme, replacing the option run style of offense previously run by Pasqualoni, and new defensive schemes.

The 2005 season started on a high note as Syracuse nearly upset eventual Big East and Sugar Bowl champion West Virginia, forcing five turnovers in the 15–7 loss. They followed it up with a 31–0 thrashing of Buffalo and another near-upset, this time against #25 Virginia, falling 27–24 on a last-second field goal. The squad lost its final eight games of the season. Syracuse finished the year 1–10, the worst on-field season in school history and won only 10 games with Robinson running the program. Robinson's Orange improved to 4–8 in 2006 but fell to 2–10 in 2007. The 2007 season included a road upset of number-18 Louisville. When the struggles continued in 2008, Syracuse fired Robinson following a 3–9 season where the high point was a 24–23 upset of Notre Dame. At the other end of the spectrum, in a game that exemplified the Robinson era, the Orange lost 55–13 to Penn State. Robinson's .213 winning percentage on the field is the worst for a non-interim coach in school history. He has been criticized for abandoning the traditional northeast recruiting pipeline.

In 2015, Syracuse vacated all of its wins from 2005 and 2006 due to ineligible players, dropping Robinson's "official" winning percentage to .119.

=== Doug Marrone era (2009–2012) ===
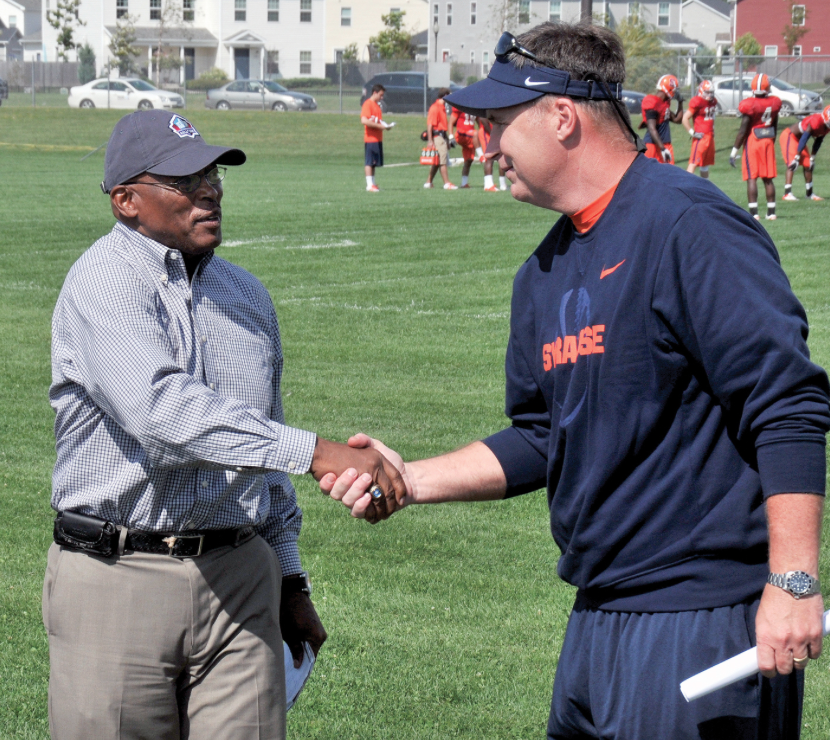
Coach Doug Marrone and Hall of Fame RB Floyd Little during training camp at Fort Drum, located in Jefferson County, New York

On December 12, 2008, Doug Marrone, a Bronx, New York native and former Orange player, was announced as the replacement for Robinson as head coach. Marrone was the first Syracuse alumnus to serve as head football coach since Reaves H. Baysinger in 1948. Reportedly, alumni such as Tim Green and Floyd Little wanted Marrone from the moment the previous coach Greg Robinson was fired, and when interviewed by Green, Marrone was found to have kept a folder of current high-school players in the Syracuse area to get a head start in recruiting.

Improvement throughout the program was noticed immediately, as the Orange, despite only a marginal improvement in their win–loss record, going 4–8 under Marrone for his first year, played many much more closely, including a 28–7 loss at number-seven Penn State. In 2010, the Orange finished the regular season with a winning record for the first time since the 2001 season at 7–5, including road wins against number-19 West Virginia and two-time defending conference champion Cincinnati. The team earned its first bowl bid since 2004 and along with second-ranked Oregon and 10th-ranked Boise State, the five road wins were the best in 2010 of all FBS teams. December 30, 2010, Syracuse defeated Kansas State in the inaugural Pinstripe Bowl at Yankee Stadium. The game was televised live on ESPN. Two years later, the Orange defeated West Virginia in the 2012 Pinstripe Bowl. On January 7, 2013, Marrone left Syracuse, accepting the head-coaching position of the NFL's Buffalo Bills.

=== Scott Shafer era (2013–2015) ===
The day after Marrone's departure, Syracuse promoted defensive coordinator Scott Shafer to head coach. Coach Shafer's first season was marked by inconsistency from the team in spite of the bowl eligibility for the third time in four years. Syracuse capped off the season with a 21–17 victory over Minnesota in the 2013 Texas Bowl to finish the year 7–6. The first season for the Orange in the ACC was 2013. The 2014 season brought about a noticeable drop in quality. Syracuse finished the season a disappointing 3–9. In 2015, after they started the season 3–0, the Orange collapsed, losing 8 of their final 9 games to finish the season 4–8, and on November 23, 2015, it was announced that Shafer would be fired after the last game of the 2015 campaign.

=== Dino Babers era (2016–2023) ===
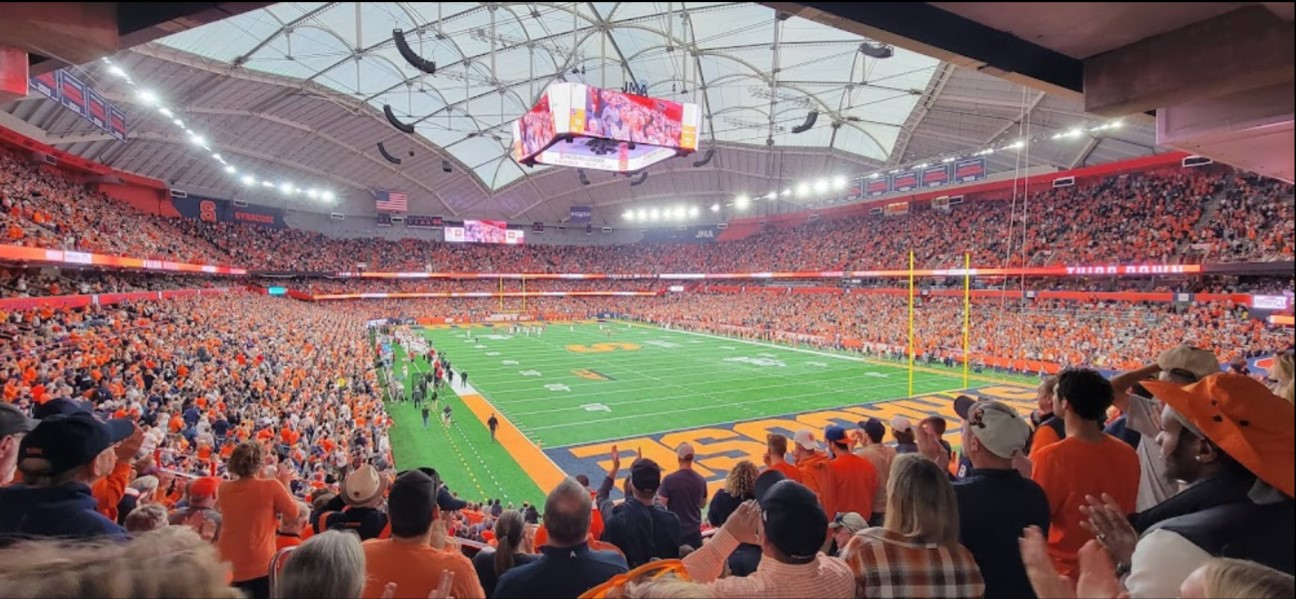
JMA Dome crowd in 2022

After an extensive coaching search, Syracuse announced the hiring of Bowling Green head coach Dino Babers as the new Orange head football coach. Babers was the first African-American head coach in school history. Babers brought with him an exciting, up-tempo offense he employed both as a head coach and as an assistant coach.

In Babers' first season in charge, Syracuse started the year at 4–4, with the highlight of the first eight games being a 31–17 upset of number-17 Virginia Tech at home. Syracuse kept the momentum from the upset going and beat rival Boston College on the road, 28–20. However, they were blown out 54–0 in their next game by No. 3 Clemson. In the final game of the season, Syracuse lost to ACC rival Pittsburgh by a score of 76–61. The game was the highest scoring in FBS history with a combined score of 137. Syracuse finished 4–8 for the second consecutive year. In 2017, the Orange started 4–3, including a win over No. 2 Clemson, but they lost their final five games to finish 4–8 for the third straight year. In 2018, Syracuse earned its first bowl bid under Babers, going 10–3 with a bowl victory over West Virginia.

In 2022, Syracuse started 6–0, earning a No. 14 ranking in the AP and Coaches' Polls. However, the team squandered a 21–10 halftime lead to Clemson, falling 27–21. The Orange lost their next four games before finishing the season with a win at Boston College to end the year 7–5. Syracuse earned a trip to the Pinstripe Bowl where it lost to Minnesota, 28–20. After a 4–0 start to the 2023 season, Syracuse lost 6 of the next 7 games, leading to Babers' firing with one game remaining in the 2023 season.

=== Fran Brown era (2024–present) ===
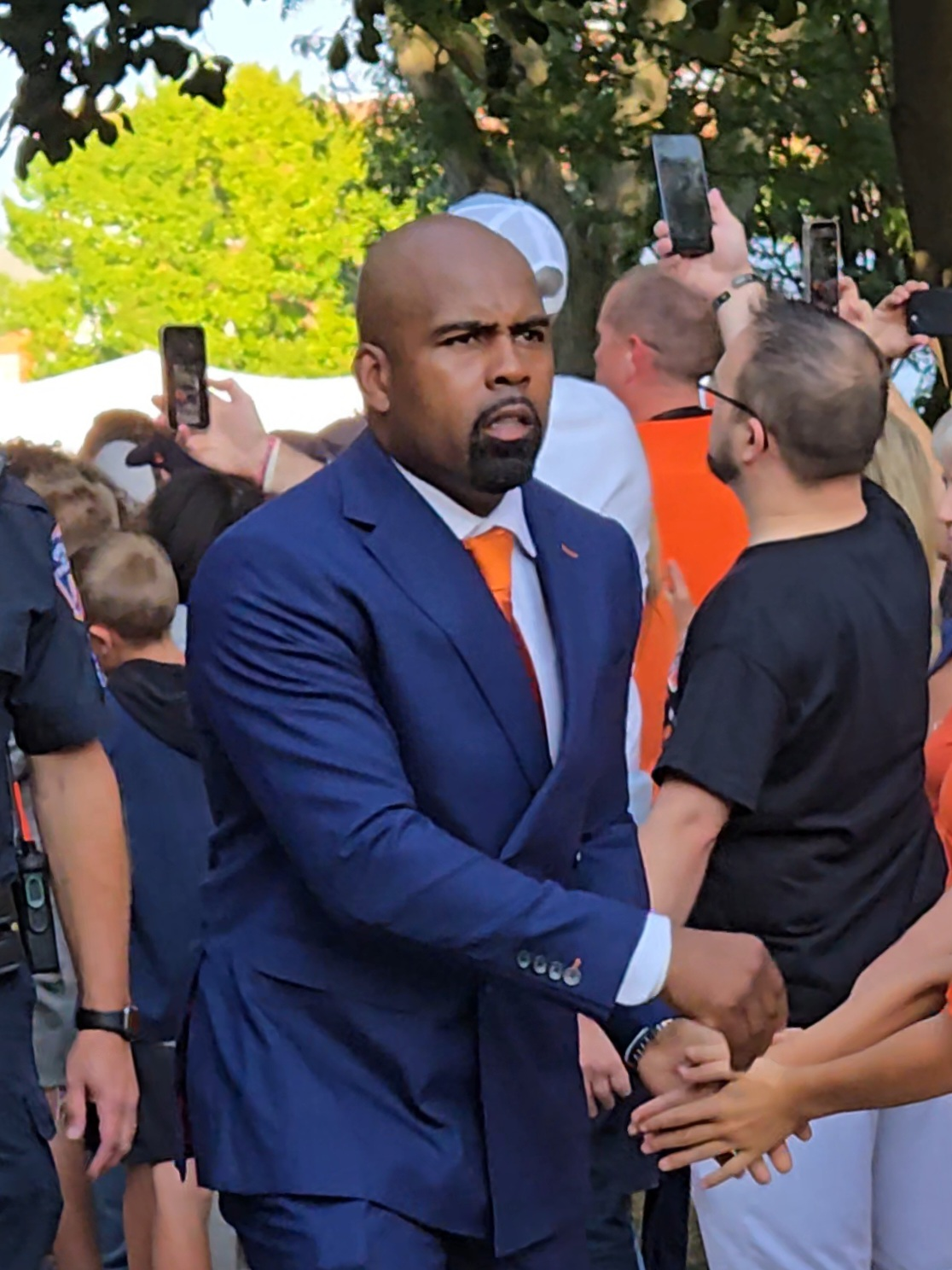
Fran Brown at the Syracuse Orange football quad walk (2024)

On November 28, 2023, Brown was named the 31st head coach in program history. His deep recruiting ties in South Jersey, one of Syracuse's primary recruiting grounds, were cited as a major reason for his hiring. Less than a month later, Fran Brown signed Syracuse's best recruiting class in the "modern era" according to the Syracuse Post-Standard. The class included several high-profile transfers, including five-star recruit Kyle McCord, the starting quarterback from the Ohio State Buckeyes.

The Brown era begun with a 38–22 win over Ohio, and he led the Orange to their first 9-win season since 2018. It included ranked wins over Georgia Tech, UNLV, and then beating then CFP ranked Miami. McCord broke several of Syracuse's single-season passing records, including the single-season passing record against UConn, as well as leading FBS in passing yards in 2024. Syracuse entered the AP, Coaches, and CFP rankings after the Miami game. On 27 December, Syracuse traveled to San Diego to play in the Holiday Bowl against Washington State. They won 52–35.

== Conference affiliations ==
Syracuse has been independent and affiliated with two conferences.

- Independent (1889–1990)
- Big East Conference (1991–2012)
- Atlantic Coast Conference (2013–present)

== Championships ==
=== National championships ===
Syracuse finished their undefeated 1959 season with a 23–14 victory over the No. 4 Texas Longhorns in the Cotton Bowl, and were named the national champions by all major selectors, including the major wire-services: AP and Coaches' Poll.

Year	Coach	Selectors	Record	Bowl	Opponent	Result	Final AP	Final Coaches
1959	Ben Schwartzwalder	AP, Billingsley, Boand, DeVold, Football News, Football Research, Football Writers, Helms, Litkenhous, NCF, NFF, Poling, Sagarin (ELO-Chess)*, UPI, Williamson	11–0	Cotton Bowl	Texas	W 23–14	No. 1	No. 1

=== Conference championships ===
In 1991, the majority of football independents in the East (including Syracuse) aligned themselves together in the Big East Football Conference. The Big East first crowned an official champion in 1993. In 2013, Syracuse joined the Atlantic Coast Conference (ACC). They have won five conference championships, three shared.

Year	Coach	Conference	Overall record	Conference record
1996†	Paul Pasqualoni	Big East Conference	9–3	6–1
1997	Paul Pasqualoni	Big East Conference	9–4	6–1
1998	Paul Pasqualoni	Big East Conference	8–4	6–1
2004†	Paul Pasqualoni	Big East Conference	6–6	4–2
2012†	Doug Marrone	Big East Conference	8–5	5–2

† Co-champions

=== Eastern championships ===
For much of its history, Syracuse played as an independent, as did the majority of what are now labeled as Division I FBS football-playing schools located in the Northeast and Mid-Atlantic regions. During this time, Eastern Championships were named by independent third-party selectors and awarded of various trophies. The process of picking an Eastern Champion eventually came to be symbolized by the Lambert-Meadowlands Trophy awarded by the New Jersey Sports and Exposition Authority beginning in 1936. As a result, the Lambert-Meadowlands Trophy, voted on by a panel of sports writers in New York, became the de facto conference championship for those schools.

Year	Coach	Conference	Overall record
1952	Ben Schwartzwalder	ECAC (Lambert-Meadowlands Trophy)	7–3
1956	Ben Schwartzwalder	ECAC (Lambert-Meadowlands Trophy)	7–2
1959	Ben Schwartzwalder	ECAC (Lambert-Meadowlands Trophy)	11–0
1966	Ben Schwartzwalder	ECAC (Lambert-Meadowlands Trophy)	8–3
1987	Dick MacPherson	ECAC (Lambert-Meadowlands Trophy)	11–0–1
1992	Paul Pasqualoni	ECAC (Lambert-Meadowlands Trophy)	10–2

== Head coaches ==
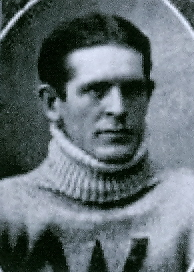
Frank "Buck" O'Neill in 1901

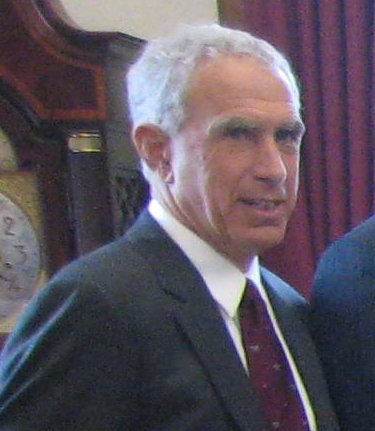
Coach Paul Pasqualoni coached the Orange from 1991 to 2004

There have been 31 head coaches at Syracuse. Fran Brown became the most recent head coach in 2024.

College Football Hall of Fame inductee

Tenure	Coach	Years	Record	Pct.
1890	Robert Winston	1	7–4	.636
1891	William Galbraith	1	4–6	.400
1892	Jordan C. Wells	1	0–8–1	.056
1894	George H. Bond	1	6–5	.545
1895–1896	George O. Redington	2	11–5–4	.650
1897–1899	Frank E. Wade	3	17–9–2	.643
1900–1902	Edwin R. Sweetland	3	20–5–2	.778
1903	Jason B. Parish & Ancil D. Brown	1	5–4	.556
1904–1905	Charles P. Hutchins	2	14–6	.700
1906–1907 1913–1915 1917–1919	Frank "Buck" O'Neill	8	52–19–6	.714
1908	Howard Jones	1	6–3–1	.650
1909–1910	Tad Jones	2	9–9–2	.500
1911–1912	C. DeForest Cummings	2	9–8–2	.526
1916	Bill Hollenback	1	5–4	.556
1920–1924	Chick Meehan	5	35–8–4	.787
1925–1926	Pete Reynolds	2	15–3–2	.800
1927–1929	Lew Andreas	3	15–10–3	.589
1930–1936	Vic Hanson	7	33–21–5	.602
1937–1942 1944–1945	Ossie Solem	8	30–27–6	.524
1946	Biggie Munn	1	4–5	.444
1947–1948	Reaves Baysinger	2	4–14	.286
1949–1973	Ben Schwartzwalder	25	153–91–3	.626
1974–1980	Frank Maloney	7	32–46	.410
1981–1990	Dick MacPherson	10	66–46–4	.586
1991–2004	Paul Pasqualoni	14	107–59–1	.644
2005–2008	Greg Robinson	4	10–37	.213
2009–2012	Doug Marrone	4	25–25	.500
2013–2015	Scott Shafer	3	14–23	.378
2016–2023	Dino Babers	8	41–55	.427
2024–present	Fran Brown	2	13–12	.520

== Traditions and legacy ==
=== Retirement of #44 ===
Syracuse University officially retired #44 on Saturday, November 12, 2005. Since 1954, 11 players have worn the number and three of the most famous #44s — Jim Brown, Ernie Davis, and Floyd Little — are in the College Football Hall of Fame.

==== "The Greatest" ====
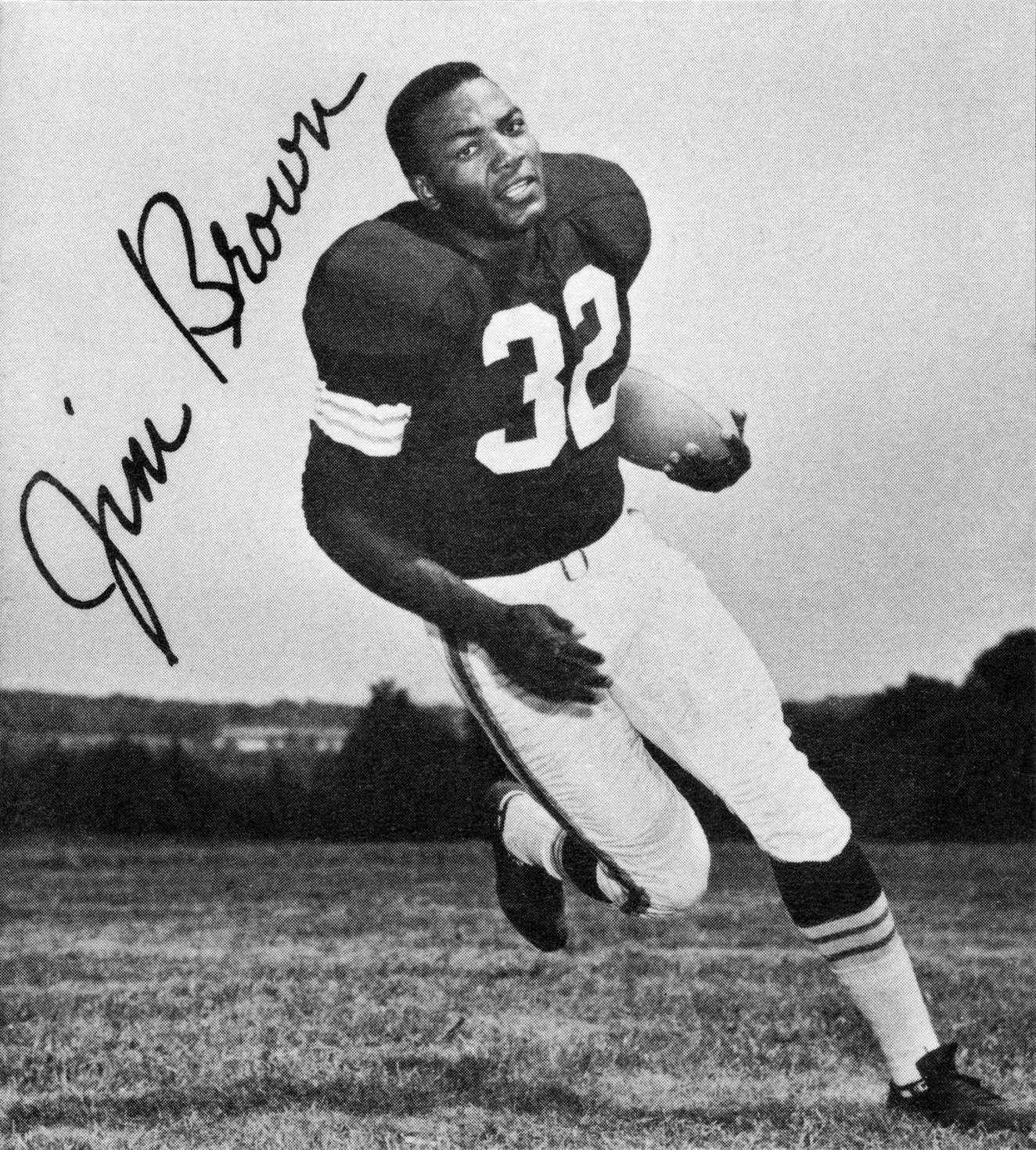
Jim Brown '57, Pro Football Hall of Fame and College Football Hall of Fame tailback

Jim Brown played at SU from 1954 to 1956. Brown earned numerous honors as Orange playing college football, basketball, track and field and lacrosse. In his senior year in 1956 Brown was a consensus first-team All-American and led the team to a Cotton Bowl. He finished fifth in the Heisman Trophy voting and set school records for highest season rush average (6.2), most rushing touchdowns in a single game (6), and an NCAA single-game record of 43 points. After his successful college career, Brown went on to become one of the greatest football players of all time.

Jim Brown was an All Pro and a Pro Bowl invitee every season he was in the league, was awarded the AP NFL Most Valuable Player three times, and won an NFL championship with the Browns in 1964. He led the league in rushing yards in eight out of his nine seasons, and by the time he retired, he had broken various rushing records. Brown's professional career led to his induction into the Pro Football Hall of Fame in 1971. His accomplishments at Syracuse garnered him a berth in the College Football Hall of Fame, and he was also inducted into the Lacrosse Hall of Fame.

Brown was one of the NFL's earliest social issues activists. In the 1960s, Brown co-founded the Black Economic Union to support black-owned businesses. In the 1980s he also started the Amer-I-Can program which mentors youth in both inner cities and prisons.

==== "The Elmira Express" ====
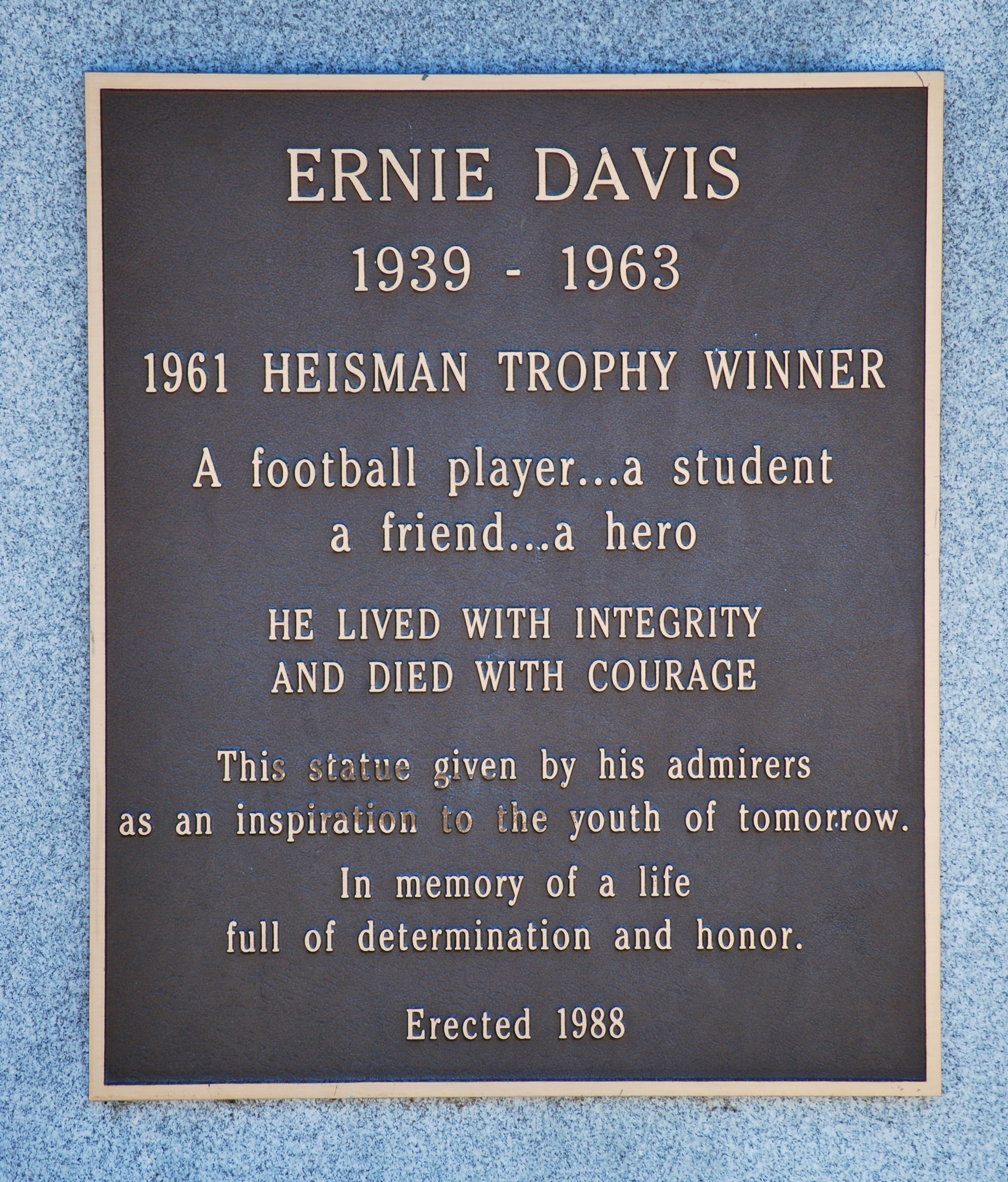
Plaque on statue of Ernie Davis, Ernie Davis Academy, Elmira, New York

Ernie Davis, the only Orange player to win the Heisman Trophy, played at Syracuse from 1959 to 1961, and went on to national fame in each of those three seasons, winning first-team All-American honors twice. Davis led the 1959 Syracuse team to a national championship, capping an 11–0 season with a 23–14 win over the Texas Longhorns in the 1960 Cotton Bowl Classic, where Davis was named Most Valuable Player. That same season, Elmira Star-Gazette sports writer Al Mallette coined the nickname for Davis, the "Elmira Express".

During his Cotton Bowl visit to host city Dallas, Texas, Ernie and his black teammates found discrimination prevalent in the American South. Author Jocelyn Selim writes that at the banquet following the 1960 game, Davis was told he could only accept his award and then would be required to leave the segregated facility when the doors were opened to the public for a dance.

Despite the racial issues, Davis became the first black athlete to be awarded the Heisman Trophy (the highest individual honor in collegiate football) and he also won the Walter Camp Memorial Trophy following his 1961 season at Syracuse University. President John F. Kennedy had followed Davis' career and requested to meet him while he was in New York to receive the trophy. Later in 1963, when Elmira chose February 3 to celebrate Davis' achievements, Kennedy sent a telegram, reading:

Seldom has an athlete been more deserving of such a tribute. Your high standards of performance on the field and off the field, reflect the finest qualities of competition, sportsmanship and citizenship. The nation has bestowed upon you its highest awards for your athletic achievements. It's a privilege for me to address you tonight as an outstanding American, and as a worthy example of our youth. I salute you.

Davis was the number-one pick in the 1962 NFL draft. He was bound to go to the Cleveland Browns where he would be teammates with Jim Brown. Davis signed a three-year contract with the Browns in late December 1961. It was the most lucrative contract for an NFL rookie up to that time.

However, Davis' dream of pairing with Jim Brown took a tragic turn when Davis was diagnosed with leukemia. The disease was incurable and Davis died at age 23 at Cleveland Lakeside Hospital on May 18, 1963. Following his death, the Browns retired his number 45 jersey.

A motion picture biography, The Express: The Ernie Davis Story, directed by Gary Fleder and based on the non-fiction book The Elmira Express: the Story of Ernie Davis by Robert C. Gallagher, began production in April 2007 and was released on October 10, 2008.

His commemorative statue now stands in front of the school named in his honor, Ernie Davis Academy. Another statue of Davis stands on the campus of Syracuse University, near the steps of Hendricks Chapel and the Shaw Quad where pre-game pep rallies are held. He was inducted to the College Football Hall of Fame in the fall of 1979.

==== "The Franchise" ====
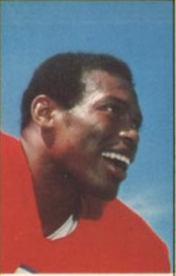
Floyd Little

Floyd Little played for Syracuse from 1964 to 1966. He is the only three-time All-American running back to compete for the Syracuse University Orangemen. He finished 5th in Heisman Trophy voting in both 1965 and 1966. Floyd was the leading force behind teams that earned tickets to the Sugar Bowl in 1964 and the Gator Bowl in 1966 (teaming with another great tailback Larry Csonka in the latter). In addition to breaking the running records of Brown and Davis, Little became the greatest kick returner in Orange history. He led the country in all-purpose yardage, averaging 199 yards per game in 1965. Floyd Little was the first ever first-round draft pick to sign with the American Football League's Denver Broncos. During his rookie year, Little led the NFL in punt returns with a 16.9-yard average. He led the NFL in combined yards in 1967 and 1968 and was the first ever Bronco to win a rushing title, leading the AFC in rushing in 1970 and the following year he became the first Bronco to eclipse 1,000 yards, gaining 1,133 to lead the NFL. Little was Denver Broncos team captain all 9 seasons, including his rookie season and he was known as "The Franchise". Floyd Little retired as the NFL's 7th all-time leading rusher with 6,323 yards. He later was inducted both in the College and Pro Football Hall of Fame. To honor his achievements Denver Broncos retired his #44 jersey.

Statues of Davis (second on campus), Brown and Little are at Syracuse University's Plaza 44, commemorating the number the running backs wore while playing football. No. 44 has become so associated with Syracuse that all university phone numbers begin with 44 and the university's ZIP code, 13244, was requested by university officials to remember those who wore 44 for the Orange. “Number 44 not only has come to represent greatness on the football field, it has become a part of the university's and the community's identity”.

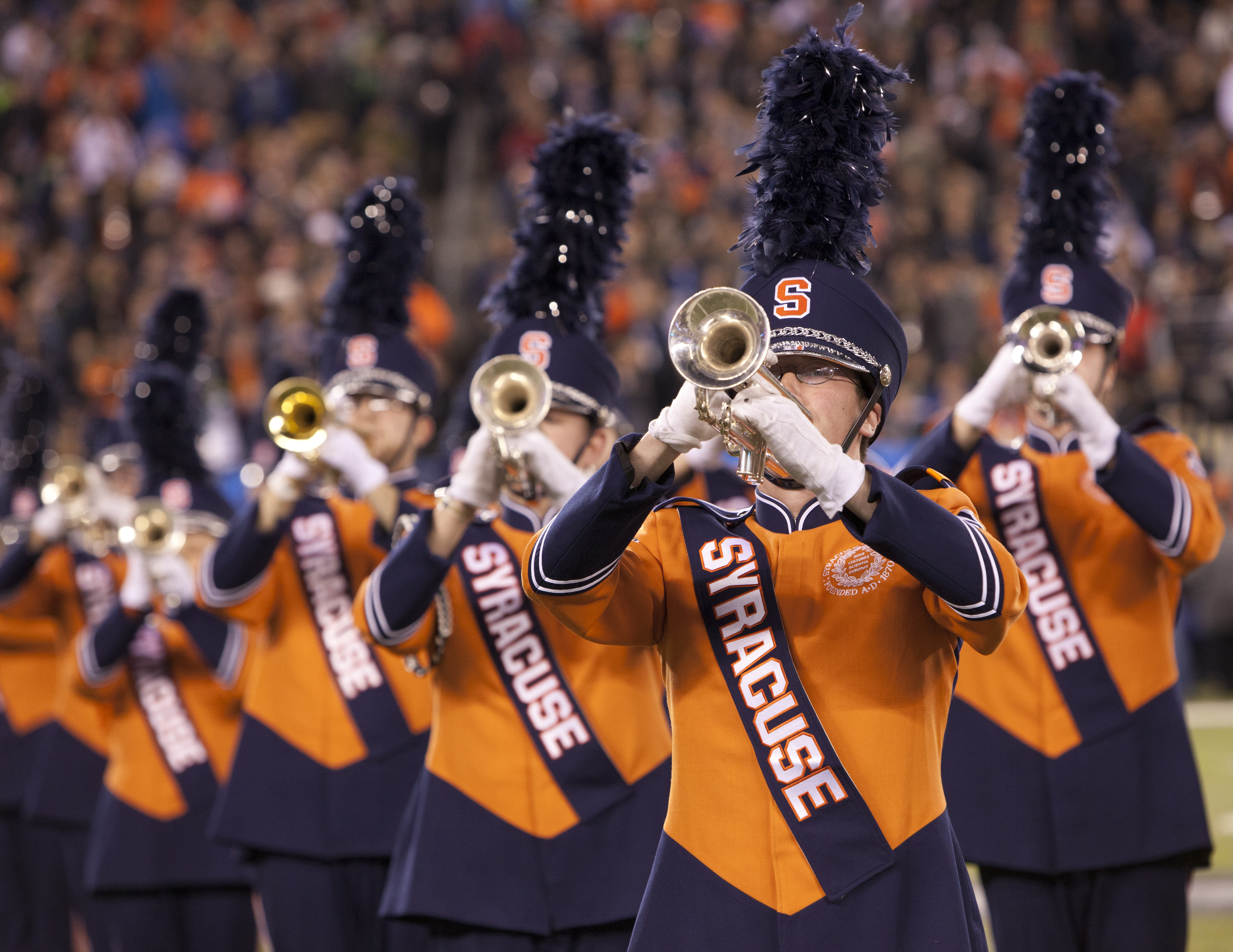
Syracuse band performing at Super Bowl XLVIII.

=== Pride of the Orange ===
The Syracuse University Marching Band (SUMB), also known as the "Pride of the Orange", is the collegiate marching band of Syracuse University. The SUMB performs at all home football games throughout the season, and also makes several local parades and other performances throughout the year. It is one of the largest student organizations at Syracuse University, consisting of approximately 200 members. Founded in 1901, it is one of the oldest collegiate bands in the nation. Over the course of almost 120 years, the "Pride of the Orange" has played a huge role in university history and has been a constant source of pride for the university.

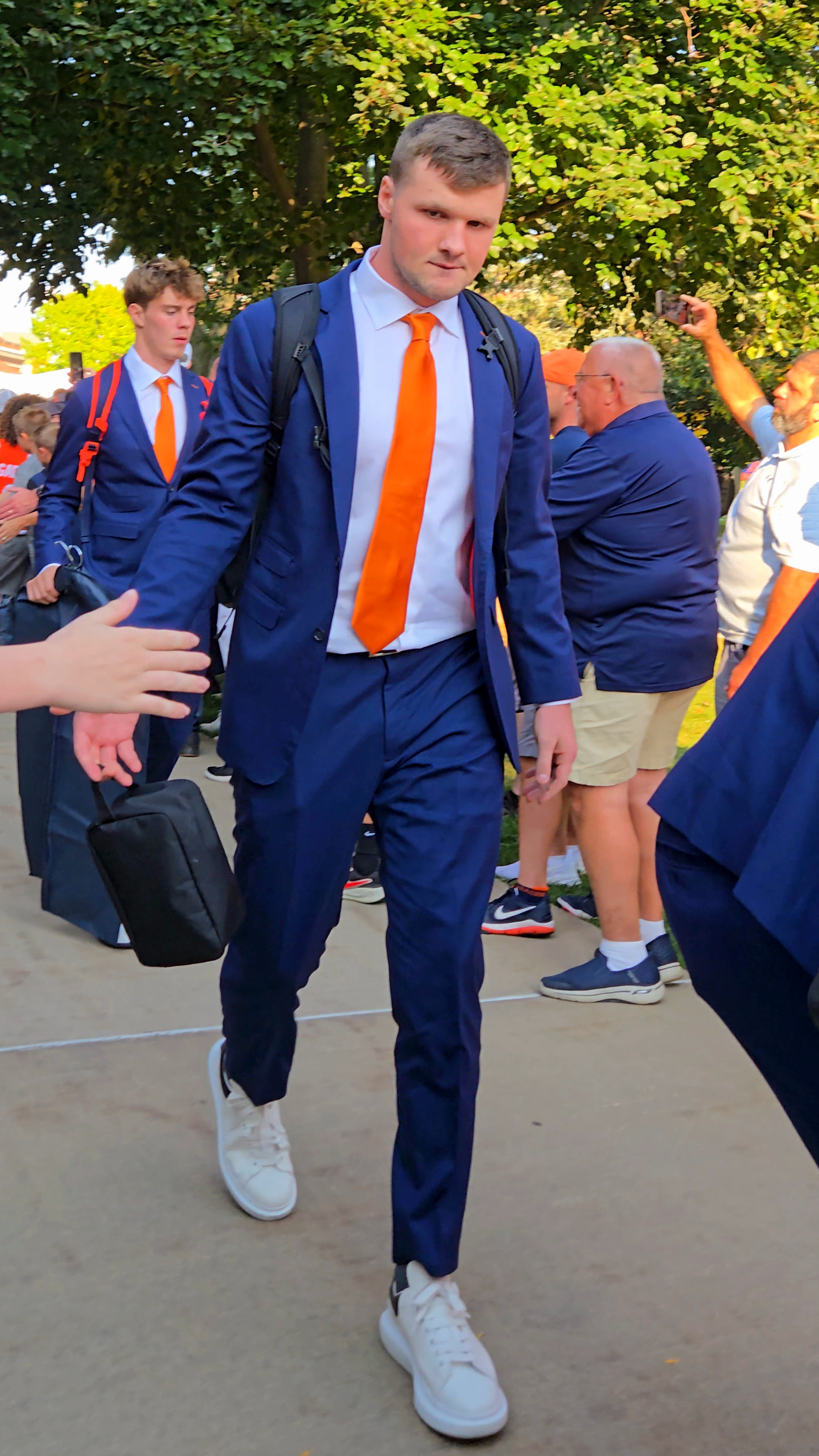
Kyle McCord at Syracuse Orange football quad walk (2024)

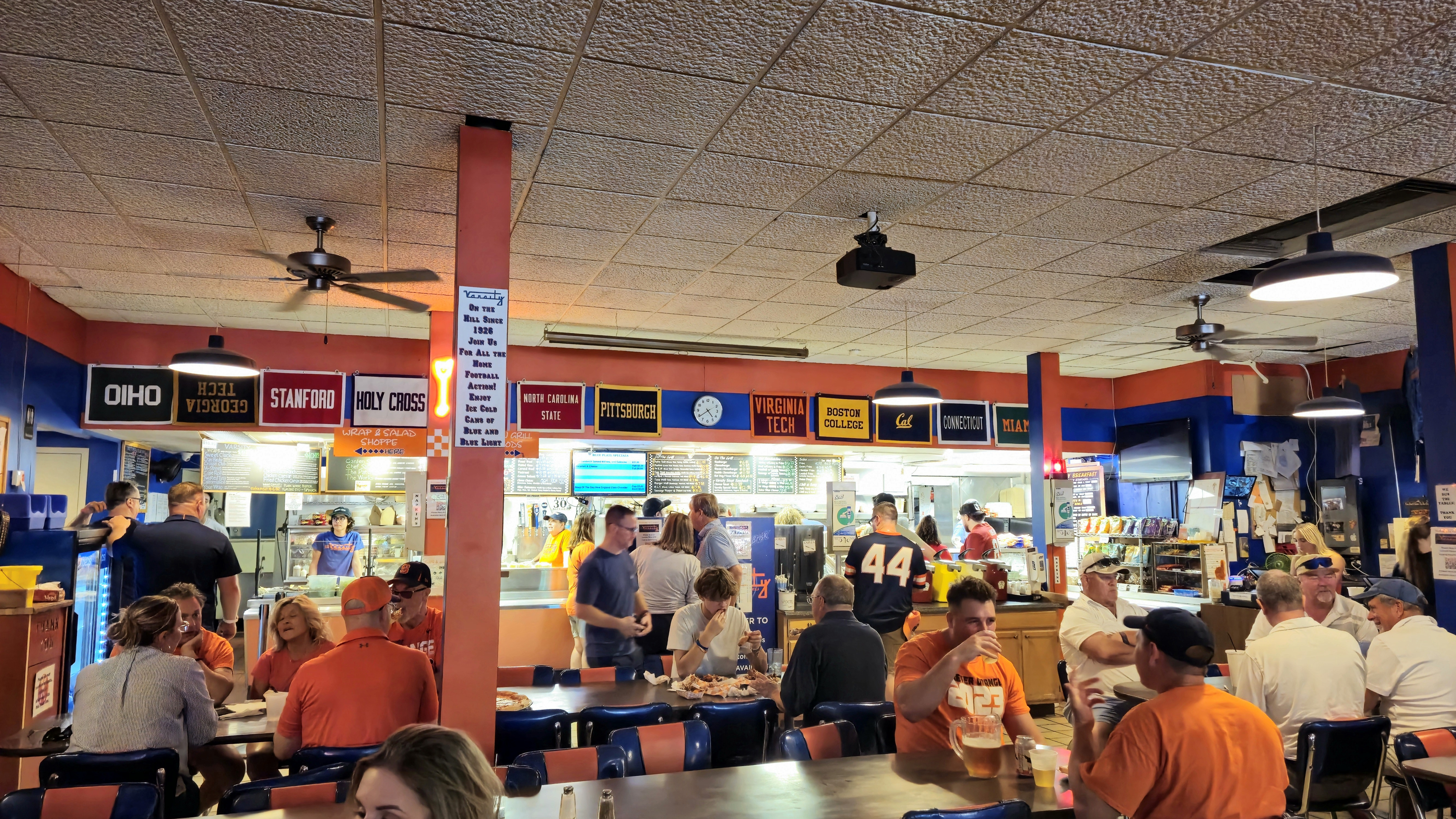
Banners at the Varsity Pizza on Marshall street.

- 'Cuse on the Quad and Quad Walk Starting three hours prior to Syracuse football home games, fans attend the social meeting, children's playground, food and beverages garden areas organized by the university located directly on the Quad, the center of the campus. Fans can watch College Game Day or the top college football games streaming live on ESPN under the tents. Fans can also take in the sights and sounds of local DJs, live music, and the Syracuse University Marching Band which performs on the steps of Hendrick's Chapel. 2 hours prior to every home game, the Orange players and coaching staff walk through the Quad, giving fans an opportunity to cheer on the team as they head into the Stadium.
- Down the Field The band has first officially performed at a football game in 1925. Over the decades, after every touchdown scored by the Orange, the SUMB plays the Syracuse University fight song, "Down the Field" (1914), written by Ralph Murphy, Class of 1916, and composed by C. Harold Lewis, Class of 1915. Win or lose, the Alma Mater is played by the band after every football game. The team will gather in the end zone with the cheerleaders and Otto and sing the song. Students and fans often wrap their arms around the shoulders of those standing next to them and sway side to side.
- Flipping the Banner at Varsity Varsity, a pizza shop just outside the campus, has been passed down for three generations since 1926. The Varsity has been an integral part of SU sports culture for decades. The Orange schedule is displayed with banners hanging on the walls of the restaurant. After victories, the "Pride of the Orange" goes to Varsity and will play their sets inside the restaurant. After the band plays, the banner of the opposing team will be flipped upside down to symbolize the victory. For the entire season, the banners will tell the tale of Syracuse's season.

== Rivalries ==
=== Pittsburgh ===
The rivalry with fellow ACC conference member Pittsburgh began in 1916, and has been played annually since 1955. The Panthers and Orange were both Eastern football independents for most of their history but have shared the same football conference since 1991 when the Big East Football Conference was formed from Eastern football independents. Pitt is tied as the most played opponent for Syracuse and Syracuse is the third most played opponent for Pitt. Sharing membership in the Atlantic Coast Conference (ACC) since 2013, the Panthers and Orange have played a total of 74 times. Pittsburgh leads the series 44–32–3 through the 2024 season.

Pittsburgh and Syracuse will play every season as part of an ACC scheduling agreement.

=== West Virginia ===
Syracuse and West Virginia have played 60 times. Often, these games have had a bearing on which collegiate program was the best in the East. In much of the '80s and '90s, Syracuse and West Virginia made for one of the Big East's best head-to-head match-ups on a yearly basis. West Virginia then left the Big East for the Big 12 Conference in 2012.

The Ben Schwartzwalder Trophy goes to the winner of the West Virginia and Syracuse football game. The trophy was introduced in 1993 and is named after former WVU football player and Syracuse head coach Ben Schwartzwalder, who had died in March of that year. The trophy weighs 55 pounds and was sculpted by Syracuse player Jimmy Ridlon.

West Virginia won the first trophy game at Syracuse and has gone on to win 11. Syracuse has won the trophy eight times and currently holds it. Syracuse leads the series 34–27 with the last two games played in 2012 Pinstripe Bowl and 2018 Camping World Bowl. Syracuse is currently on the 4 game winning streak. There are no future matchups scheduled.

=== Penn State ===
The "heyday" of the Syracuse Penn State rivalry took place during the 1950s and 1960s when the teams battled back and forth in a competitive and often controversial string of contests. Syracuse football was led by legendary coach Ben Schwartzwalder, and Penn State by Rip Engle from 1950 to 1966 and Joe Paterno from 1967 to 2011. From 1950 to 1970, Syracuse won 11 to Penn State's 10 games. Unfortunately conference realignment and scheduling disagreements have dampened the intensity of the rivalry between the teams in recent years.

The teams first met on October 28, 1922, at the New York Polo Grounds battling to a scoreless tie kick-starting an East coast rivalry that has seen 71 total match-ups with the teams meeting almost every season from 1922 to 1990. The only exception was during the 1943 season, when Syracuse did not field team in light of World War II. From 1922 to 1940 Syracuse held a 10–4–4 advantage over the Nittany Lions, before Penn State would win 8 straight from 1941 to 1949. In the 1947 match-up, Penn State prevailed 40–0 in State College behind a staunch defense that held the Orange to (−47) total yards which is an NCAA record. (−107 rushing, 60 passing, in 49 plays) From 1956 to 1966 the Orange regained command winning 8 out of 11. Since 1967, the Nittany Lions have dominated winning 24 of 27 match-ups including 16 straight from 1971 to 1986. In 1987, Dick MacPherson coached Syracuse to a 48–21 victory over the Nittany Lions in the JMA Wireless Dome. Syracuse won again the following year at Penn State, but lost the final two games before the suspension of the series in 1991.

Penn State leads the all-time series 43–23–5, and have won 5 straight. The most recent match-up was played at Metlife Stadium in East Rutherford, NJ; a 23–17 win for Penn State.

The teams are scheduled to play in State College in 2027 and in Syracuse in 2028.

=== Colgate ===
For many years, Syracuse's main football rivals were the nearby Colgate Red Raiders. Colgate and Syracuse first played each other in football in 1891, with Colgate recording a 22–16 victory. The Red Raiders would go on the win 12 of the first 16 games in the series. Colgate's early dominance in the series quickly gave rise to the legend of the Hoodoo (a play on a corruption of the word Voodoo). The schools have played each other a total of 67 times, with the series tied at 31–31–5.

By the late 1950s, Syracuse had established itself as a major power in Eastern college football, and the games became increasingly one-sided. Following the 1961 contest, Colgate terminated the series, in order to focus on playing smaller, peer institutions.

Following the NCAA's I-A/I-AA split in 1978, the rivalry was intermittently renewed in the 1980s, with Syracuse comfortably winning all three games played in the decade. In 2010, the rivalry was renewed again after a 23-year absence, with Syracuse recording a 42–7 victory. The series resumed again in 2016, when Syracuse hosted Colgate in a game played in the Carrier Dome, which Syracuse won 33–7. Syracuse has won all of the meetings since then, and are next scheduled to play in 2028.

== Uniforms ==
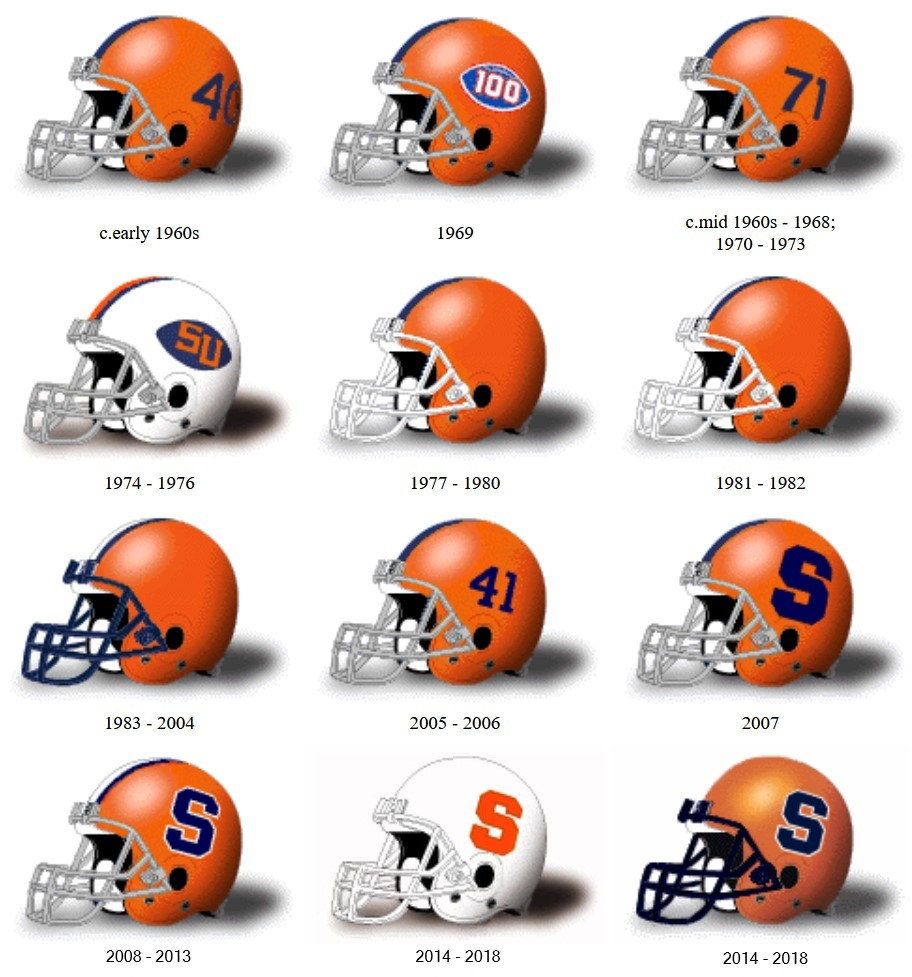
Syracuse helmet design history

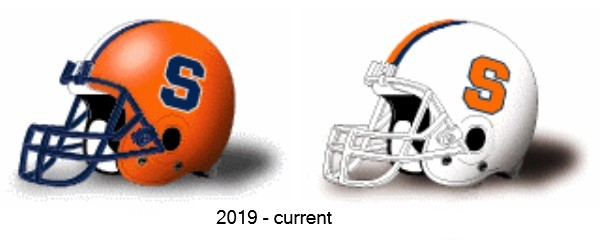
Current helmets worn by the Orange

Syracuse University adopted orange color as its official color in 1890. The color was selected after a vote by students, alumni, faculty, and trustees, who noted it was a strong, bright color not claimed by any other school. Syracuse University was the first school to adopt only one primary color. It was chosen to "represent the golden apples of Hesperia, as well as the story of the sunrise and hope for a golden future."

The first uniforms of the Orange were classic white sweaters and dark pants. Syracuse football wore these from 1889 to 1919. Orange color was first worn in the 1920s. A blue number was stitched on the back of orange jerseys, and the dark pants were replaced with Khaki moleskin. Blue began to be generally recognized as a secondary color of Syracuse.

During its glory years beginning with the first bowl game appearance in 1952, Syracuse football used to wear white jerseys and orange pants at home at Archbold stadium. From 1952 to 1966, coach Ben Schwartzwalder, with his military background and always looking for an edge, thought white jerseys made his players look bigger, faster and stronger. During his first three seasons (1949–51) and in 1958, he also experimented with an all orange look to camouflage the football. Blue jerseys were rarely seen during that era as Syracuse wore them only three times.

The switch to blue and orange combination at home came in 1967. Since then, it was blue jersey and orange pants at home until the first three Frank Maloney seasons (1974–76) when the newly assigned coach wanted to move away from the Schwartzwalder era with orange jerseys and unusually designed white helmets, before bringing blue jerseys and orange helmets back for essentially the next 28 seasons. Syracuse started wearing white jerseys and orange jerseys (and pants) at home again in the 2000s. Three colors (orange, white and blue) have been used in several combinations throughout the years.

== Bowl games ==
Since the establishment of the team in 1890, Syracuse has appeared in 29 bowl games. Included in these games are 10 combined appearances in the "New Year's Six" bowl games (the Rose, Sugar, Cotton, Orange, Fiesta and Peach) and 1 Bowl Championship Series (BCS) game appearances. The New Year's Six represent six of the ten oldest bowl games played at the FBS level (missing the Sun, Gator, Citrus and Liberty bowls), continuing their original history of putting the very best teams in the country against each other.

Syracuse's all-time bowl record is 17 wins, 11 losses and 1 tie (17–11–1).

Syracuse Orange Bowl Games
#	Bowl	Score	Date	Season	Opponent	Stadium	Attendance	Head coach
1	Orange Bowl	L 6–61	January 1, 1953	1952	Alabama	Orange Bowl	66,280	Ben Schwartzwalder
2	Cotton Bowl Classic	L 27–28	January 1, 1957	1956	TCU	Cotton Bowl	61,500	Ben Schwartzwalder
3	Orange Bowl	L 6–21	January 1, 1959	1958	Oklahoma	Orange Bowl	75,281	Ben Schwartzwalder
4	Cotton Bowl Classic	W 23–14	January 1, 1960	1959	Texas	Cotton Bowl	75,500	Ben Schwartzwalder
5	Liberty Bowl	W 15–14	December 16, 1961	1961	Miami	Philadelphia Municipal Stadium	15,712	Ben Schwartzwalder
6	Sugar Bowl	L 10–13	January 1, 1965	1964	LSU	Tulane Stadium	65,000	Ben Schwartzwalder
7	Gator Bowl	L 12–18	December 31, 1966	1966	Tennessee	Gator Bowl Stadium	60,312	Ben Schwartzwalder
8	Independence Bowl	W 31–7	December 15, 1979	1979	McNeese State	Independence Stadium	27,234	Frank Maloney
9	Cherry Bowl	L 18–35	December 21, 1985	1985	Maryland	Pontiac Silverdome	51,858	Dick MacPherson
10	Sugar Bowl	T 16–16	January 1, 1988	1987	Auburn	Louisiana Superdome	75,495	Dick MacPherson
11	Hall of Fame Bowl	W 23–10	January 1, 1989	1988	LSU	Tampa Stadium	51,112	Dick MacPherson
12	Peach Bowl	W 19–18	December 30, 1989	1989	Georgia	Atlanta–Fulton County Stadium	44,991	Dick MacPherson
13	Aloha Bowl	W 28–0	December 25, 1990	1990	Arizona	Aloha Stadium	14,185	Dick MacPherson
14	Hall of Fame Bowl	W 24–17	January 1, 1992	1991	Ohio State	Tampa Stadium	57,789	Paul Pasqualoni
15	Fiesta Bowl	W 26–22	January 1, 1993	1992	Colorado	Sun Devil Stadium	70,224	Paul Pasqualoni
16	Gator Bowl	W 41–0	January 1, 1996	1995	Clemson	Jacksonville Municipal Stadium	45,202	Paul Pasqualoni
17	Liberty Bowl	W 30–17	December 27, 1996	1996	Houston	Liberty Bowl Memorial Stadium	49,163	Paul Pasqualoni
18	Fiesta Bowl	L 18–35	December 31, 1997	1997	Kansas State	Sun Devil Stadium	69,367	Paul Pasqualoni
19	Orange Bowl	L 10–31	January 2, 1999	1998	Florida	Orange Bowl	67,919	Paul Pasqualoni
20	Music City Bowl	W 20–13	December 29, 1999	1999	Kentucky	Adelphia Coliseum	59,221	Paul Pasqualoni
21	Insight.com Bowl	W 26–3	December 29, 2001	2001	Kansas State	Bank One Ballpark	40,028	Paul Pasqualoni
22	Champs Sports Bowl	L 14–51	December 21, 2004	2004	Georgia Tech	Citrus Bowl	28,237	Paul Pasqualoni
23	Pinstripe Bowl	W 36–34	December 30, 2010	2010	Kansas State	Yankee Stadium	38,274	Doug Marrone
24	Pinstripe Bowl	W 38–14	December 29, 2012	2012	West Virginia	Yankee Stadium	39,098	Doug Marrone
25	Texas Bowl	W 21–17	December 27, 2013	2013	Minnesota	Reliant Stadium	32,327	Scott Shafer
26	Camping World Bowl	W 34–18	December 28, 2018	2018	West Virginia	Camping World Stadium	41,125	Dino Babers
27	Pinstripe Bowl	L 20–28	December 29, 2022	2022	Minnesota	Yankee Stadium	31,131	Dino Babers
28	Boca Raton Bowl	L 0–45	December 21, 2023	2023	South Florida	FAU Stadium	20,711	Nunzio Campanile (interim)
29	Holiday Bowl	W 52–35	December 27, 2024	2024	Washington State	Snapdragon Stadium	23,920	Fran Brown

== National polls ==
Syracuse has finished in the Final Top 25 rankings 22 times in the national polls, and finished in either the AP or Coaches Polls a combined 35 times since 1952. Syracuse has appeared in over 200 AP Polls including 7 weeks at AP No. 1.

Syracuse Final Rankings

Year	Record	AP Poll†	Coaches‡
1952	7–3	14	–
1956	7–2	8	8
1958	8–2	9	10
1959	11–0	1	1
1960	7–2	19	–
1961	8–3	14	16
1963	8–2	–	12
1964	7–4	–	12
1966	8–3	–	16
1967	8–2	–	12
1987	11–0–1	4	4
1988	10–2	13	12

Year	Record	AP Poll†	Coaches‡	CFP^
1990	7–4–2	–	21
1991	10–2	11	11
1992	10–2	6	7
1995	9–3	19	16
1996	9–3	22	19
1997	9–4	21	20
1998	8–4	25	24
2001	10–3	14	14
2018	10–3	15	15	19
2024	10–3	20	22	21

† AP Poll began selecting the nation's Top 20 teams in 1936. Only the Top 10 teams were recognized from 1962 to 1967. The AP Poll expanded back to the Top 20 teams in 1968. In 1989, it began recognizing the Top 25 teams.

‡ UPI/Coaches Poll began selecting its Top 20 teams on a weekly basis in 1950 before expanding to the nations's Top 25 teams in 1990.

^ College Football Playoff (CFP) committee began selecting the Top 25 teams in 2014.

== Individual award winners ==
=== Retired numbers ===
Syracuse University retired eight jersey numbers^{1} and hung them in the JMA Wireless Dome rafters.

Syracuse Orange football retired numbers

Donovan McNabb; 1995–1998

Don McPherson; 1984–1987

Larry Csonka; 1965–1967

(25 players) ^{2} 1921–1998

Joe Morris; 1978–1981

Dwight Freeney; 1998–2001

Tim Green; 1982–1986

John Mackey; 1960–1962

Notes

^{1}Syracuse doesn't retire numbers, instead retiring individual players' jerseys by hanging their number in the JMA Dome.
^{2} The complete list of players who wore number 44 (by chronological order): Gifford Zimmerman, Charles Roberts, Clarence Taylor, Don Baldwin, Richard Fishel, Henry Merz, Hamilton Watt, Francis Mullins, Stanley Stanislay, Benjamin DeYoung, Francis Mazejko, Richard Ransom, J. O'Brien, Robert Eberling, Jim Brown, Thomas Stephens, Ernie Davis, William Schoonover, Floyd Little, Richard Panczyszyn, Mandel Robinson, Glenn Moore, Michael Owens, Terry Richardson, and Rob Konrad.

=== The 150 greatest players in college football's 150-year history ===
Jim Brown is named as the greatest player in college football history. ESPN unveiled college football's 150 greatest players of the first 150 years of history of college football. ESPN's top 150 players were determined by a blue-ribbon panel of current and former writers, broadcasters, administrators, sports information directors and ESPN personalities.

Rank	Name	Pos.	Years
1	Jim Brown	RB	1954–56
15	Ernie Davis	RB	1959–61
52	Floyd Little	RB	1964–66

=== Heisman Trophy voting ===
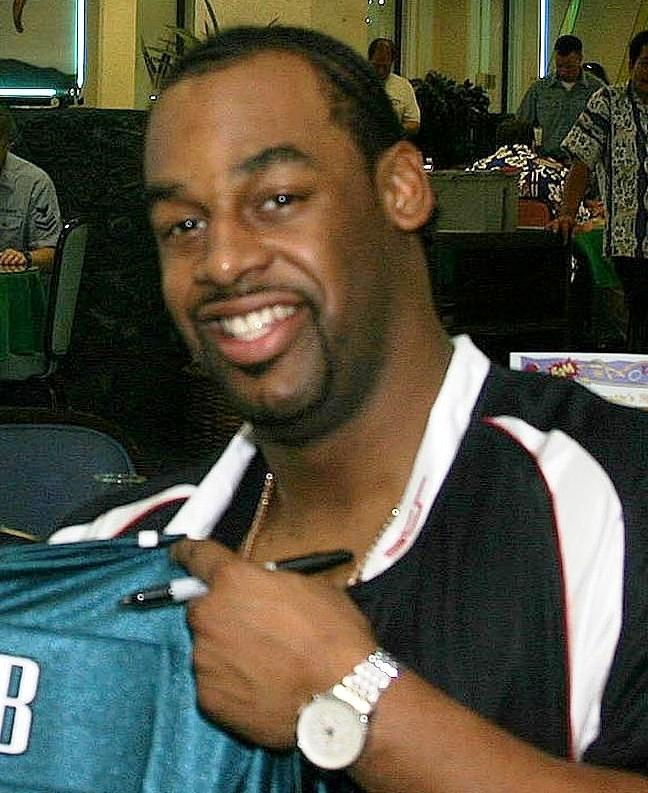
QB Donovan McNabb in 2004

Name	Pos.	Year	Place
Kyle McCord	QB	2024	10th
Dwight Freeney	DE	2001	9th
Donovan McNabb	QB	1998	5th
Don McPherson	QB	1987	2nd
Larry Csonka	FB	1967	4th
Floyd Little	RB	1966	5th
Floyd Little	RB	1965	5th
Ernie Davis	RB	1961	1st
Jim Brown	HB	1956	5th

=== National award winners ===
Heisman Trophy Best player
1961	Ernie Davis
Walter Camp Trophy Best player
1961	Ernie Davis
Maxwell Award Best player
1987	Don McPherson
Walter Camp All-Century Team Best player of the century
2000	Jim Brown
Walter Camp Man of the Year Man of the Year
1978	Floyd Little
Walter Camp Alumni of the Year Distinction in excellence as an athlete
2000	Don McPherson

Chic Harley Award College Football Player
1961	Ernie Davis
Bronko Nagurski Trophy Best defensive player
2001	Dwight Freeney †
Chuck Bednarik Award Best defensive player
2001	Dwight Freeney †
Davey O'Brien Award Best quarterback
1987	Don McPherson
1993	Marvin Graves †
Johnny Unitas Golden Arm Award Best senior quarterback
1987	Don McPherson
1993	Marvin Graves †
1998	Donovan McNabb †
Sammy Baugh Trophy Best quarterback
1987	Don McPherson

Jim Thorpe Award Best defensive back
1987	Markus Paul †
1988	Markus Paul †
Lombardi Award Best lineman or linebacker
1984	Tim Green †
1985	Tim Green †
1987	Ted Gregory †
2001	Dwight Freeney †
Lou Groza Award Best kicker
2018	Andre Szmyt
Vlade Award Most accurate placekicker
2018	Andre Szmyt
Walter Camp Distinguished American Award Great success in business or public service
2011	Floyd Little

NFF Distinguished American Award Excellence in scholarship, citizenship, leadership
1982	Jim Brown
Silver Anniversary Awards Achievement in life
1982	Jim Brown
1992	Floyd Little
2011	Tim Green
AFCA Good Works Team Accomplishments off the field
2000	Kyle Johnson
2001	Graham Manley
2004	Matt Tarulo
2014	Sam Rodgers
2018	Kielan Whitner
Academic All-America Hall of Fame Outstanding collegiate scholar-athletes
2006	Tim Green

† Finalist

=== National coaching awards ===
FWAA First-Year Coach of the Year Best first-year head coach
2024	Fran Brown
Paul "Bear" Bryant Newcomer Coach of the Year Best first-year head coach
2024	Fran Brown
AFCA Coach of the Year Best head coach
1959	Ben Schwartzwalder
1987	Dick MacPherson
Walter Camp Coach of the Year Best head coach
1987	Dick MacPherson

Sporting News College Football Coach of the Year Best head coach
1987	Dick MacPherson
Eddie Robinson Coach of the Year Best head coach
1959	Ben Schwartzwalder
1987	Dick MacPherson

Woody Hayes Trophy Best head coach
1987	Dick MacPherson
Bobby Dodd Coach of the Year Best head coach
1987	Dick MacPherson
Paul "Bear" Bryant Award Best coach
1987	Dick MacPherson

Walter Camp Man of the Year Man of the Year
1973	Duffy Daugherty
Amos Alonzo Stagg Award Outstanding services in the advancement of the best interests of football
1970	Pappy Waldorf
1977	Ben Schwartzwalder
1985	Duffy Daugherty

=== Consensus All-Americans ===
Syracuse football players have earned All-America honors over 130 times since 1908. Among those selections, 20 have achieved Consensus All-American status. Of those consensus All-Americans, 9 are unanimous selections. Below is the list of first team All Americans named by major selectors.

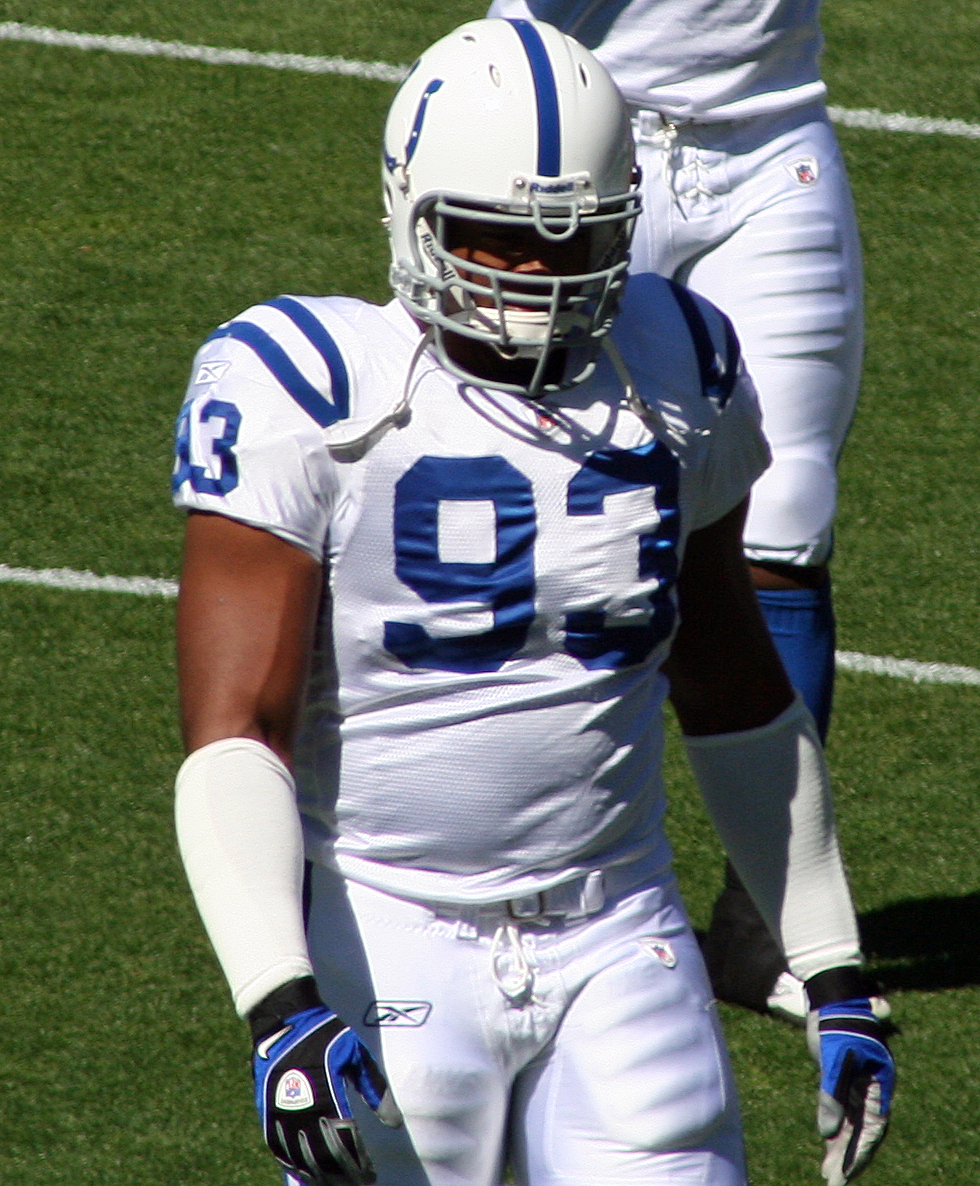
Dwight Freeney

All-America team selections

Season	Name	Pos.
1908	Frank "Bill" Horr*	T
1908	Claude Fisher	E
1915	Harold White*	G
1915	Red Wilkinson	HB
1915	Chris Schlachter	G
1917	Chris Schlachter	G
1917	Alfred Cobb*	T
1918	Lou Usher*	G
1918	Willard Ackley	QB
1918	Doc Alexander	G
1919	Doc Alexander*	G
1920	Doc Alexander*	G
1920	Bertrand Gulick	T
1923	Pete MacRae*	E
1924	Pappy Waldorf	T
1924	Jack McBride	B
1926	Vic Hanson*	E
1930	George A. Ellert	E
1934	Jim Steen	T
1952	Bob Fleck	G
1953	Bob Fleck	G
1955	Jim Brown	HB
1956	Jim Brown#	HB
1958	Ron Luciano	T
1959	Roger Davis#	G

Season	Name	Pos.
1959	Robert Yates	T
1959	Fred Mautino	E
1960	Ernie Davis*	HB
1961	Ernie Davis#	HB
1964	Pat Killorin	C
1964	Floyd Little	RB
1965	Floyd Little	RB
1965	Pat Killorin	C
1965	Charlie Brown	DB
1966	Floyd Little	RB
1966	Gary Bugenhagen	G
1966	Larry Csonka	FB
1967	Larry Csonka#	FB
1968	Tony Kyasky	DB
1968	Art Thoms	DL
1970	Joe Ehrmann	DL
1971	Tom Myers	DB
1975	Ray Preston	LB
1978	Joe Morris	RB
1979	Art Monk	WR
1981	Gary Anderson	K
1982	Mike Charles	DL
1984	Tim Green	DL
1985	Tim Green#	DL
1987	Ted Gregory*	DL

Season	Name	Pos.
1987	Don McPherson#	QB
1988	Markus Paul	DB
1989	Rob Moore	WR
1989	John Flannery	C
1990	John Flannery*	C
1991	Qadry Ismail	KR
1992	Chris Gedney#	TE
1992	Marvin Graves	QB
1995	Marvin Harrison	AP
1995	Kevin Abrams	DB
1996	Kevin Abrams	DB
1996	Antwaune Ponds	LB
1997	Donovin Darius	S
1997	Quinton Spotwood	KR
1997	Donovan McNabb	QB
1998	Kevin Johnson	KR
1999	Keith Bulluck	LB
2001	Dwight Freeney#	DE
2008	Tony Fiammetta	FB
2009	Chandler Jones	DE
2012	Ryan Nassib	QB
2017	Steve Ishmael	WR
2018	Andre Szmyt#	K
2018	Andre Cisco	S
2021	Sean Tucker	RB
2024	Oronde Gadsden II	TE

* – Consensus All-Americans
# – Unanimous All-Americans

=== Eastern College Athletic Conference (ECAC) awards ===
ECAC Player of the Year
1966	Floyd Little
1967	Larry Csonka
1987	Don McPherson

ECAC Offensive Player of the Year
1979	Bill Hurley
1980	Joe Morris

ECAC Defensive Player of the Year
1985	Tim Green
ECAC Rookie of the Year
1990	Marvin Graves

=== Big East Conference awards ===
Offensive Player of the Year
1996	Donovan McNabb
1997	Donovan McNabb
1998	Donovan McNabb
ECAC Coach of the Year
1992	Paul Pasqualoni
1995	Paul Pasqualoni
1996	Paul Pasqualoni

Defensive Player of the Year
1991	George Rooks
1997	Donovin Darius
2001	Dwight Freeney
AFCA Regional Coach of the Year
2010	Doug Marrone

Rookie of the Year
1995	Donovin Darius
Special Teams Player of the Year
1992	John Biskup
1993	Pat O'Neil
1995	Marvin Harrison
1997	Quinton Spotwood
1998	Kevin Johnson

ECAC Rookie of the Year
1994	Antwaune Ponds
1995	Donovan McNabb
2011	Dyshawn Davis
Scholar Athlete of the Year
2001	Kyle Johnson
2012	Ryan Nassib

=== Big East Football 10th Anniversary honors ===
The best players of the decade and the team, which includes 29 players, was selected by Big East media members to celebrate the 10th year of Big East football.

Offensive Player of the Decade
QB	Donovan McNabb
Special Teams Player of the Decade
KR/WR	Kevin Johnson

Big East Team of the Decade
QB	Donovan McNabb
WR	Marvin Harrison
KR	Kevin Johnson
CB	Kevin Abrams
S	Donovin Darius

=== Atlantic Coast Conference awards ===
AP ACC Coach of the Year
2018	Dino Babers †
ECAC Coach of the Year
2018	Dino Babers

Defensive Rookie of the Year
2018	Andre Cisco
Brian Piccolo Award
2020	Nolan Cooney
Jim Tatum Award
2020	Kingsley Jonathan

ECAC Offensive Player of the Year
2018	Eric Dungey
ECAC Defensive Rookie of the Year
2018	Andre Cisco
ECAC Rookie of the Year
2021	Duce Chestnut
2024	Maraad Watson

† co-winner

=== ACC All-Conference selections ===
Syracuse football players in All-ACC teams since 2013.

All-ACC team selections

Season	Name	Pos.
2013	Macky MacPherson	C
2013	Jerome Smith	RB
2013	Durell Eskridge	S
2013	Jay Bromley	DT
2014	Sean Hickey	T
2014	Cameron Lynch	LB
2015	Riley Dixon*	P
2015	Ron Thompson	DE
2015	Brisly Estime	APB
2016	Amba Etta-Tawo*	WR
2016	Zaire Franklin	LB
2016	Brisly Estime	APB
2016	Sterling Hofrichter	P
2017	Steve Ishmael*	WR

Season	Name	Pos.
2017	Ervin Philips	WR
2017	Parris Bennett	LB
2017	Cole Murphy	K
2018	Sean Riley	APB
2018	Andre Szmyt*	K
2018	Sterling Hofrichter*	P
2018	Jamal Custis	WR
2018	Alton Robinson	DE
2018	Andre Cisco*	S
2018	Ryan Guthrie	LB
2018	Eric Dungey	QB
2018	Koda Martin	T
2019	Sterling Hofrichter*	P
2019	Trishton Jackson	WR

Season	Name	Pos.
2019	Andre Cisco	S
2019	Lakiem Williams	LB
2019	Andre Szmyt	K
2020	Nykeim Johnson	KR
2020	Taj Harris	WR
2020	Nolan Cooney	P
2020	Ifeatu Melifonwu	CB
2021	Duce Chestnut	CB
2021	Cody Roscoe*	DE
2021	Sean Tucker*	RB
2021	Mikel Jones*	LB
2022	Mikel Jones	LB
2022	Sean Tucker	RB
2022	Sean Tucker	APB

Season	Name	Pos.
2022	Matthew Bergeron	T
2022	Oronde Gadsden II*	TE
2023	LeQuint Allen	RB
2023	Marlowe Wax	LB
2023	Jack Stonehouse	P
2024	Oronde Gadsden II*	TE
2024	Kyle McCord	QB
2024	Trebor Pena	WR
2024	Jackson Meeks	WR
2024	Clarence Lewis	DB
2025	Jack Stonehouse*	P

* – 1st All-ACC

== Hall of Fame ==
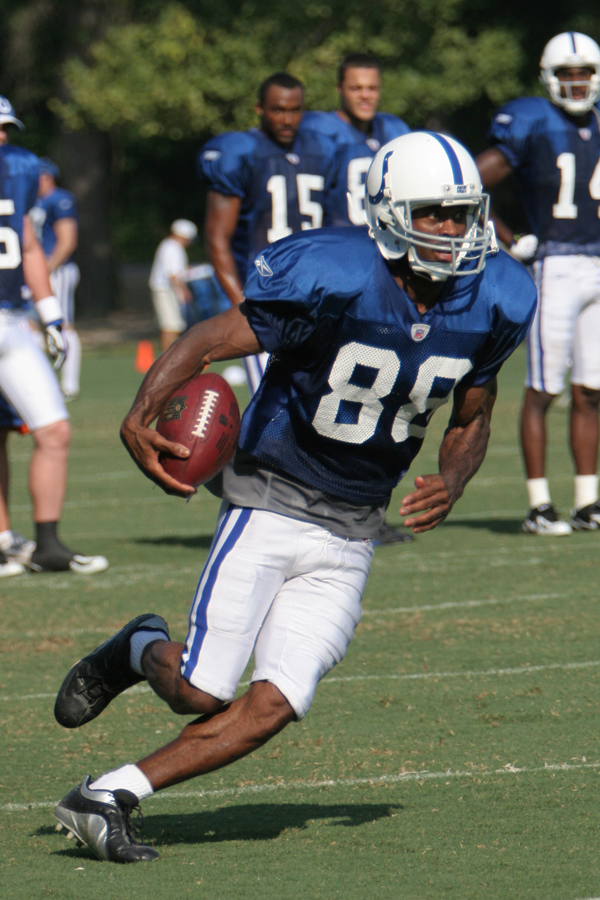
Marvin Harrison, Hall of Fame WR

=== College Football Hall of Fame ===
Syracuse is one of the most represented schools in the National Football Foundation's College Hall of Fame. The Orange have 20 enshrinees, second-most among ACC programs behind Pittsburgh (25). Syracuse has had 13 players and 7 former coaches inducted into the Hall of Fame.

Name	Pos.	Years	Inducted
Frank "Buck" O'Neill	HC	1906–07; 1913–15; 1917–19; 1936	1951
Howard Jones	HC	1908	1951
Joe Alexander	G	1917–1920	1954
Tad Jones	HC	1909–1910	1958
Biggie Munn	HC	1946	1959
Lynn 'Pappy' Waldorf	T	1922–1924	1966
Bud Wilkinson	HC	1938–41	1969
Jim Brown	HB	1954–1956	1971
Vic Hanson	E/HC	1924–26; 1928–36	1973
Ernie Davis	HB	1959–1961	1979
Ben Schwartzwalder	HC	1949–1973	1982
Floyd Little	RB	1964–1966	1983
Hugh "Duffy" Daugherty	G/HC	1937–39; 1940, 1946	1984
Larry Csonka	FB	1965–1967	1989
Tim Green	DT	1982–1985	2002
Don McPherson	QB	1984–1987	2008
Dick MacPherson	HC	1980–1990	2009
Art Monk	WR	1976–1979	2012
Dwight Freeney	DE	1998–2001	2023
Marvin Harrison	WR	1992–1995	2026

=== Pro Football Hall of Fame ===
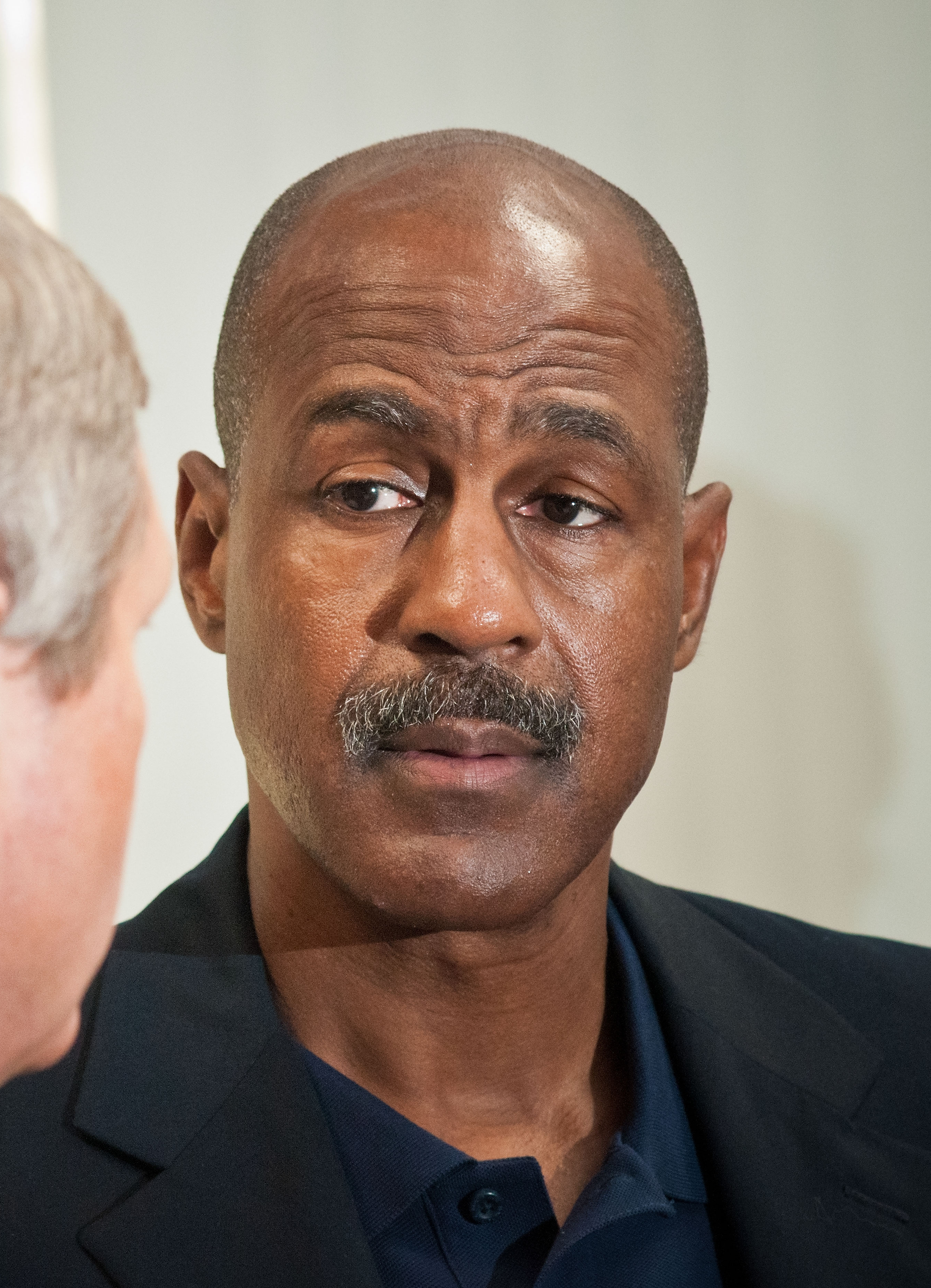
Art Monk, Hall of Fame WR

Syracuse's legacy in the Pro Football Hall of Fame ranks among the finest of any college football program. The Orange boast eight inductees, tied for the eight-most of any school. Only Notre Dame (13), USC (13), Michigan (11), Ohio State (10), Miami (9), and Pittsburgh (9) have more representatives in the Pro Football Hall of Fame than Syracuse.

Name	Team (Years)	Position	Inducted
Jim Brown	Cleveland Browns (1957–65)	FB	1971
Jim Ringo	Green Bay Packers (1953–63)	C	1981
Larry Csonka	Miami Dolphins (1968–74, 1979)	FB	1987
John Mackey	Baltimore Colts (1963–71)	TE	1992
Al Davis	Oakland Raiders (1963–2011)	Owner/GM/Commissioner	1992
Art Monk	Washington Redskins (1980–93)	WR	2008
Floyd Little	Denver Broncos (1967–75)	RB	2010
Marvin Harrison	Indianapolis Colts (1996–2008)	WR	2016
Dwight Freeney	Indianapolis Colts (2002–2012)	EDGE	2024

== Orange in the National Football League ==
=== NFL All-Time Team ===
The National Football League 100th Anniversary All-Time Team was revealed in 2019 after being voted on by a panel consisting of media members, former players and league personnel. It honored the best players of the first 100 years of the National Football League (NFL). The team was chosen by a panel of 26 voters made up of coaches, team and front office executives, former players and members of the media between April and June 2018. Players were selected at each position group, and were voted in no order. There will be 10 quarterbacks, 12 running backs, 10 wide receivers, 5 tight ends, 7 tackles, 7 guards, 4 centers, 7 defensive ends, 7 defensive tackles, 6 outside linebackers, 6 middle/inside linebackers, 7 cornerbacks, 6 safeties, 2 kickers, 2 punters, 2 kick/punt returners, and 10 coaches. Sources:

Position	Player	Team(s) played for	Accolades
RB	Jim Brown	Cleveland Browns (1957–1965)	Hall of Fame (1971), NFL 75th Anniversary All-Time Team, NFL 1960s All-Decade Team, NFL Rookie of the Year (1957), 3× AP NFL Most Valuable Player (1957, 1958, 1965), 8× First-team All-Pro (1957–1961, 1963–1965), 9× Pro Bowler (1957–1965), NFL champion (1964)
WR	Marvin Harrison	Indianapolis Colts (1996–2008)	Hall of Fame (2016), NFL 2000s All-Decade Team, 3× First-team All-Pro (1999, 2002, 2006), 8× Pro Bowler (1999–2006), Super Bowl champion (XLI)
TE	John Mackey	Baltimore Colts (1963–1971); San Diego Chargers (1972)	Hall of Fame (1992), NFL 1960s All-Decade Team, 3× First-team All-Pro (1966–1968), 4× Pro Bowler (1963, 1966–1968), NFL champion (1968), Super Bowl champion (V)

Bold Unanimous selection.

=== NFL All-Decade Teams ===
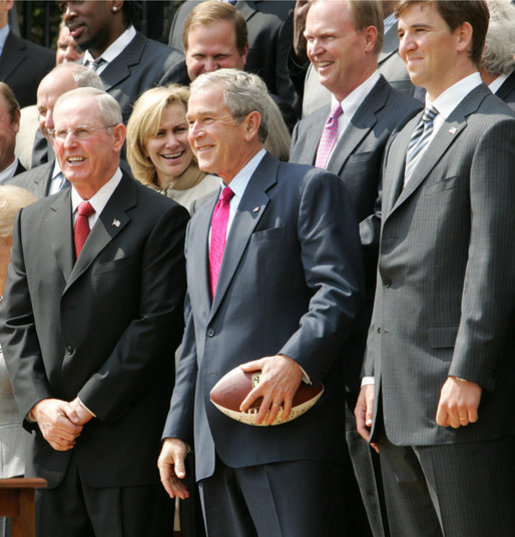
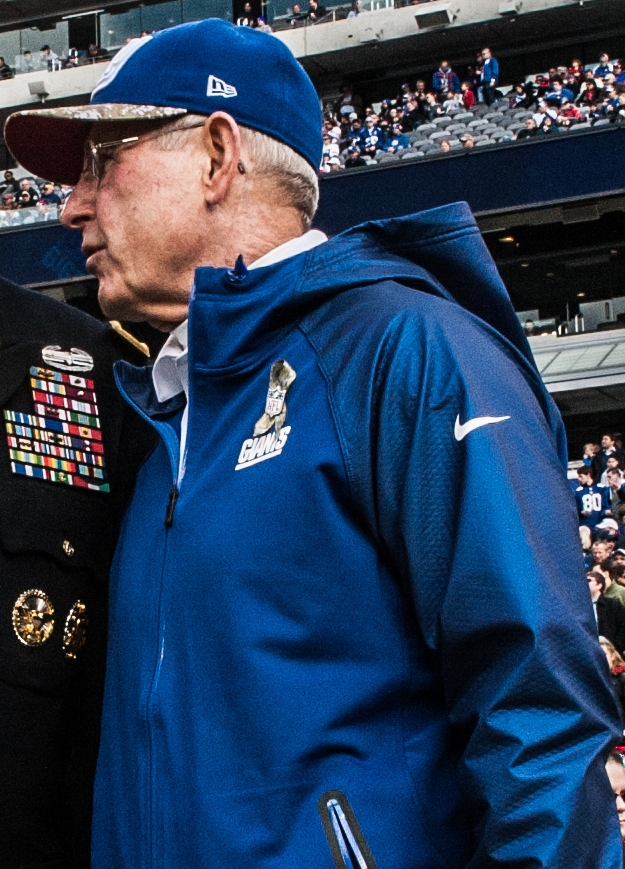
Tom Coughlin in the White House after winning a Super Bowl with the New York Giants

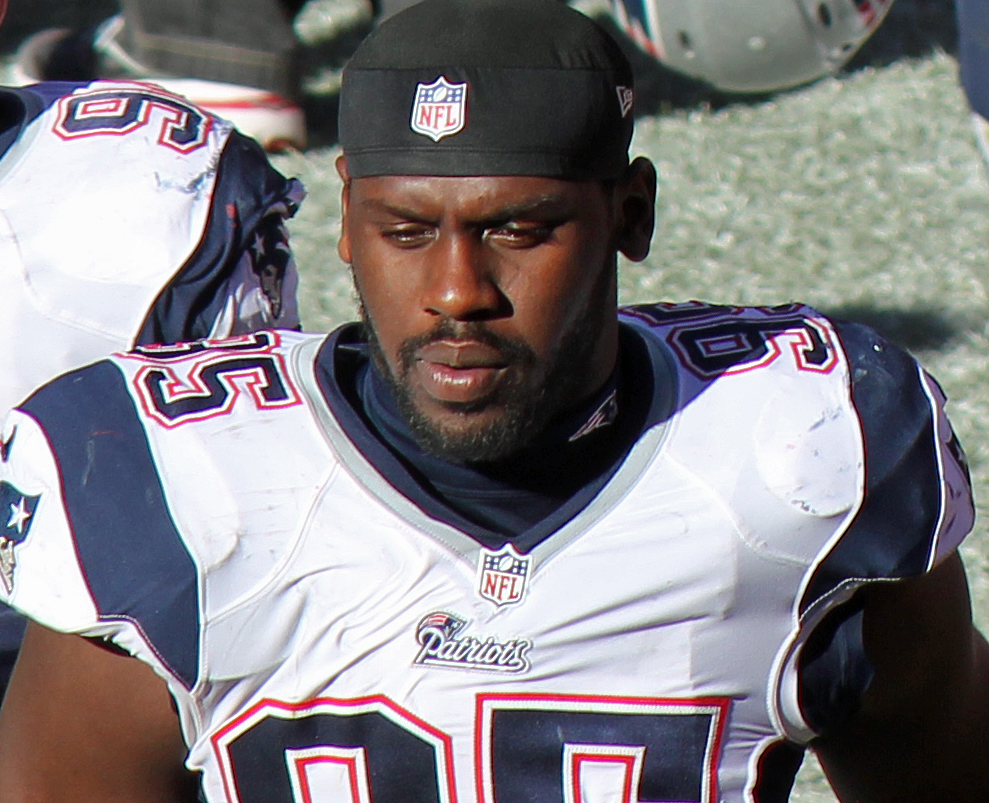
Chandler Jones

NFL All-Decade Teams
Name	Team	Pos.	Decade
Jim Brown	Cleveland Browns	RB	1960s
John Mackey	Baltimore Colts	TE	1960s
Jim Ringo	Green Bay Packers; Philadelphia Eagles	C	1960s
Walt Sweeney	San Diego Chargers	G	AFL All-Time
Art Monk	Washington Redskins	WR	1980s
Gary Anderson	Pittsburgh Steelers	K	1980s
Gary Anderson	Pittsburgh Steelers; Minnesota Vikings	K	1990s
Dwight Freeney	Indianapolis Colts	DE	2000s
Marvin Harrison	Indianapolis Colts	WR	2000s
Chandler Jones	New England Patriots; Arizona Cardinals	EDGE	2010s

=== NFL Individual Awards ===
NFL MVP
Name	Team	Pos.	Year
Jim Brown	Cleveland Browns	RB	1957, 1958, 1963, 1965

NFL Super Bowl MVP
Name	Team	Pos.	Year
Larry Csonka	Miami Dolphins	HB	1974

AFL MVP
Name	Team	Pos.	Year
Jim Nance	New England Patriots	RB	1966

NFC Player of the Year
Name	Team	Pos.	Year
Donovan McNabb	Philadelphia Eagles	QB	2000

Jim Brown Award
Name	Team	Pos.	Year
Jim Brown	Cleveland Browns	RB	1957–61, 1963–65
Floyd Little	Denver Broncos	RB	1971

Deacon Jones Award
Name	Team	Pos.	Year
Dwight Freeney	Indianapolis Colts	DE	2004
Chandler Jones	Arizona Cardinals	EDGE	2017

NFL Comeback Player of the Year
Name	Team	Pos.	Year
Larry Csonka	Miami Dolphins	HB	1979

NFL Rookie of the Year Award
Name	Team	Pos.	Year
Jim Brown	Cleveland Browns	RB	1957

Golden Toe Award
Name	Team	Pos.	Year
Gary Anderson	Minnesota Vikings	K	1998

NFL GM/Executive of the Year
Name	Team	Pos.	Year
Al Davis	Las Vegas Raiders	GM/Owner	1976, 2002
Scott Pioli	New England Patriots	GM	2003, 2004, 2007
Scott Pioli	Kansas City Chiefs	GM	2010

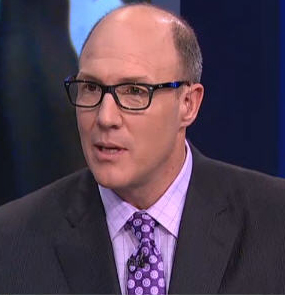
All-Decade (2000s) NFL Executive Scott Pioli

NFL GM/Executive of the Decade
Name	Team	Pos.	Year
Scott Pioli	Patriots, Chiefs	GM	2000s

Coach of the Year
Name	Team	Pos.	Year
Al Davis	Las Vegas Raiders	HC	1963
Tom Coughlin	Jacksonville Jaguars	HC	1996

=== All-Pro and Pro Bowls ===
Orange in the Pro Bowls and as All-Pro
Name	Team	Pos.	Pro-Bowl	All-Pro
Jim Ringo	Green Bay Packers; Philadelphia Eagles	C	1957, 1958, 1959, 1960, 1961, 1962, 1963, 1964, 1965, 1967	1957, 1958, 1959, 1960, 1961, 1962, 1963, 1964, 1966
Jim Brown	Cleveland Browns	RB	1957, 1958, 1959, 1960, 1961, 1962, 1963, 1964, 1965	1957, 1958, 1959, 1960, 1961, 1962, 1963, 1964, 1965
Walt Sweeney	San Diego Chargers	G	1964, 1965, 1966, 1967, 1968, 1969, 1970, 1970, 1971, 1972	1967, 1968, 1969, 1970, 1971
Marvin Harrison	Indianapolis Colts	WR	1999, 2000, 2001, 2002, 2003, 2004, 2005, 2006	1999, 2000, 2001, 2002, 2003, 2004, 2005, 2006
Dwight Freeney	Indianapolis Colts	DE	2003, 2004, 2005, 2008, 2009, 2010, 2011	2003, 2004, 2005, 2009
Larry Csonka	Miami Dolphins	FB	1970, 1971, 1972, 1973, 1974	1971, 1972, 1973
Floyd Little	Denver Broncos	RB	1968, 1969, 1970, 1971, 1973	1969, 1970, 1971
John Mackey	Baltimore Colts	TE	1963, 1965, 1966, 1967, 1968	1966, 1967, 1968
Donovan McNabb	Philadelphia Eagles	QB	2000, 2001, 2002, 2003, 2004, 2009
Gary Anderson	Pittsburgh Steelers; Minnesota Vikings	K	1983, 1985, 1993, 1998	1983, 1985, 1998
Chandler Jones	New England Patriots; Arizona Cardinals	DE	2015, 2017, 2019, 2021	2017, 2019
Art Monk	Washington Redskins	WR	1984, 1985, 1986	1984, 1985
Keith Bulluck	Tennessee Titans	LB	2003, 2004	2002, 2003, 2004
Jim Nance	New England Patriots	FB	1966, 1967	1966, 1967, 1969
Daryl Johnston	Dallas Cowboys	FB	1993, 1994	1993, 1994
Jim Collins	Los Angeles Rams	LB	1984, 1985	1984, 1985
Rob Moore	New York Jets; Arizona Cardinals	WR	1994, 1997	1997
Joe Morris	New York Giants	RB	1985, 1986	1986
Stan Walters	Philadelphia Eagles	T	1978, 1979	1979
Otis Wilson	Chicago Bears	LB	1985	1984, 1985
Doc Alexander	Rochester Jeffersons	C		1921, 1922
Zaire Franklin	Indianapolis Colts	LB	2024	2024
Rob Burnett	Cleveland Browns	DE	1994	2000
Olindo Mare	Miami Dolphins	K	1999	1999
Tom Myers	New Orleans Saints	DB	1979	1979
David Tyree	New York Giants	WR	2005	2005
Joe Ehrmann	Baltimore Colts	DT	1975	1976
Jack McBride	New York Giants	FB		1925
Jim Ridlon	Dallas Cowboys	DB		1964
Al Bemiller	Buffalo Bills	C	1965

== Facilities ==
=== Archbold Stadium ===
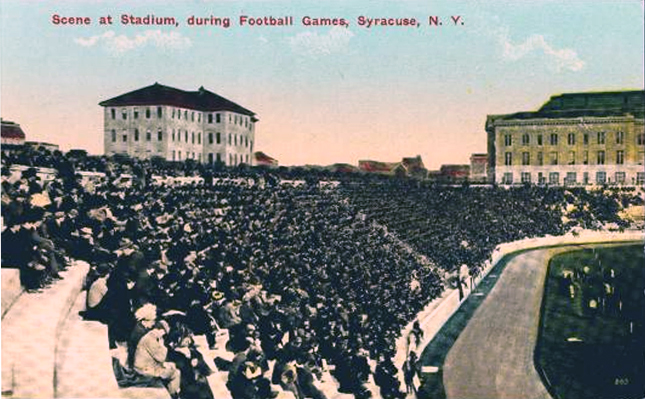
Archbold Stadium seating stands in 1914

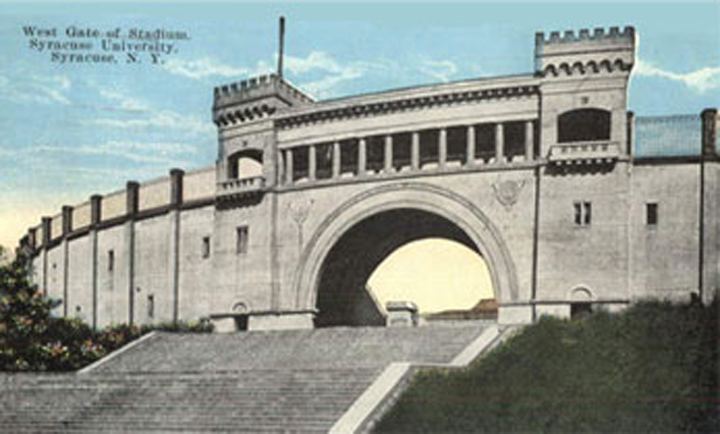
Archbold Stadium arch entrance (1922)

Upon its completion in 1907, Archbold Stadium was touted as the "Greatest Athletic Arena in America." Designed to resemble the Roman Coliseum and to never become outdated, Archbold Stadium was a trademark of Syracuse Orange football. The stadium was named for John D. Archbold, who donated $600,000 for the project. The Orange battled for victory inside the walls of Archbold Stadium from 1907 until 1978. Orange fans of the early 1900s were astonished by Archbold's unique design. The stadium's front entrance defined the character of Archbold, which consisted of an impressive cement arch and two epic towers, which extended high above the archway.

In addition to providing the university and the fans with its stadium, Archbold gave the Orange football team a distinct home field advantage for all 71 years of its existence. The Orange went 265–112–20 all-time at Archbold, and at times were nearly unbeatable. From 1915 to 1927, Syracuse achieved a home record of 61–10–6. Then, during the 11-year stretch from 1958 to 1968, the team in Orange won 47 and lost only 6 games played at Archbold Stadium.

Toward the end of the 1970s, Syracuse University was under pressure to improve its football facilities in order to remain a Division I-A football school. Archbold Stadium could not be expanded; earlier in the decade it had been reduced from 40,000 seats to 26,000 due to fire codes. Therefore, Syracuse University decided to build a new stadium on the site of Archbold, which, appropriately for Syracuse's often cold weather, was to have a domed Teflon-coated, fiberglass inflatable roof. While the JMA Wireless Dome was being built during the 1979 season, Syracuse played "home" games at three different locations—Giants Stadium, home of the NFL's New York Giants; Rich Stadium (now known as New Era Field), home of the NFL's Buffalo Bills; and Schoellkopf Field, home of the Cornell Big Red.

=== The JMA Wireless Dome ===
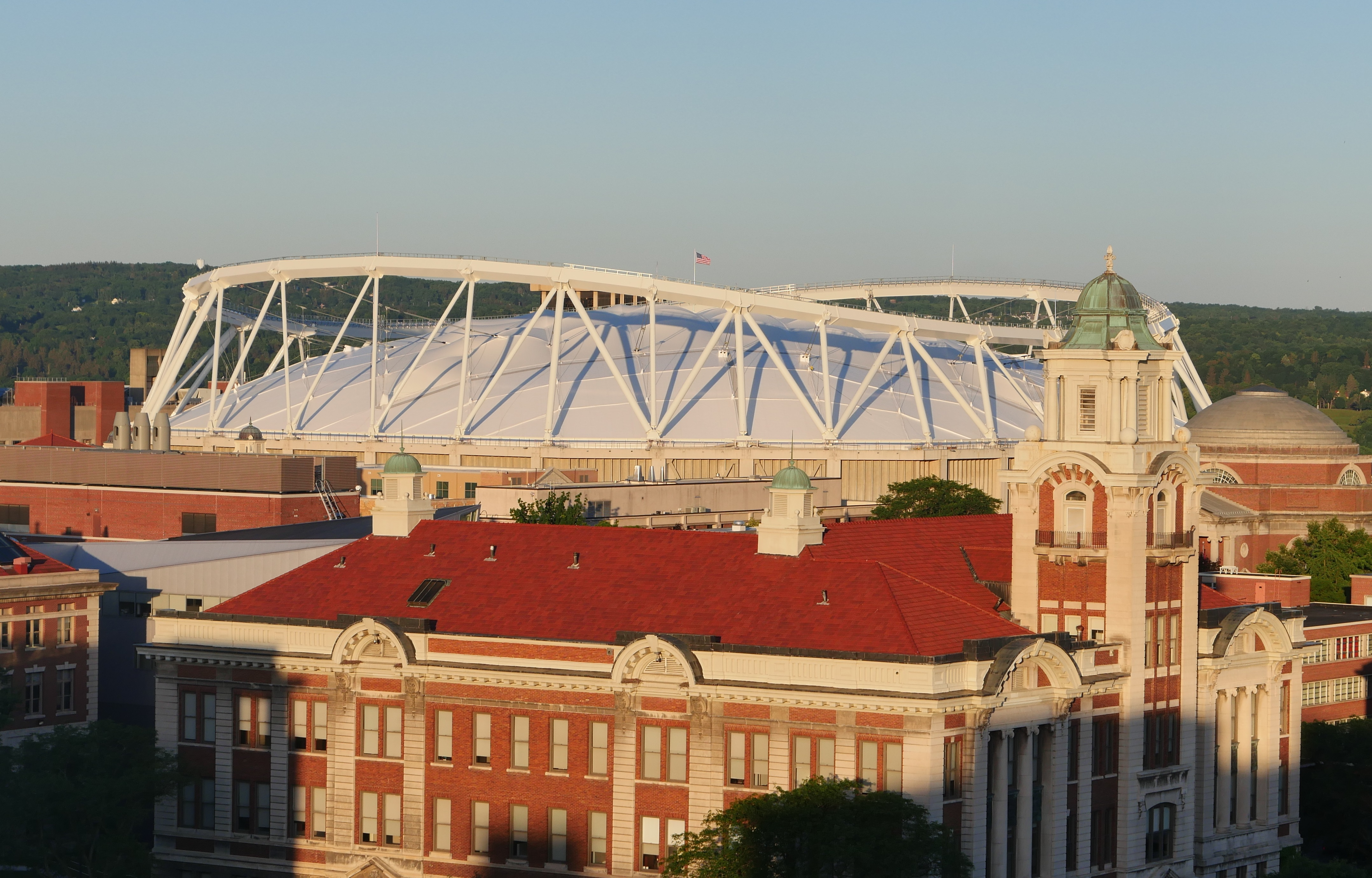
The JMA Wireless Dome (2021)

The Syracuse Orange football team plays their games at the JMA Wireless Dome, referred to as the JMA Dome. The stadium is also known as "The Loud House", when it opened in September 1980, it was made clear just how loud it was inside; soon famous nickname was coined. It is the largest domed stadium of any college campus and the largest domed stadium in the Northeastern United States. The JMA Wireless Dome is used for several sports at the university and seats 49,250 for football. The field was dedicated in 2009 to Ernie Davis, the first African American Heisman Trophy winner. The field now reads "Ernie Davis Legends Field" between the 45 yard lines on the home side. Davis's number forty-four was also placed along that yard line. The dedication took place at the Syracuse vs. West Virginia game October 10, 2009.

In May 2018, the university announced the first phase of a major renovation to the JMA Wireless Dome as the central portion of a larger campus update. The most significant changes were the replacement of the current air-supported roof with a fixed roof, two-thirds of which will be translucent, the installation of air conditioning and the largest centerhung videoboard in college sports. The upgrade also included a new lighting and sound systems, Wi-Fi improvements, accessibility upgrades, improved restrooms, and new concession spaces. The high-profile renovation project by Geiger Engineers – the same firm that was the structural engineer for the original stadium, was named a winner of NCSEA's 2021 Excellence in Structural Engineering Award for Forensic/Renovation/Retrofit/Rehabilitation Structures.

The school announced the next phase of its work to enhance, elevate and expand the stadium experience in April, 2022. This includes a complete replacement of benches with individual seats; a construction of a new publicly accessible event facility adjacent to the Dome; and an upgrade of the entire digital infrastructure, including latest 5G technology and wireless connectivity. The renovation of both phases, estimated to cost $165 million, was completed in 2024.

== Future scheduled opponents ==
Syracuse will play the following ACC teams in 2026:

- HOME: Clemson, SMU, Louisville, California
- ROAD: Pittsburgh, Boston College, Virginia, North Carolina, NC State

Announced schedules as of January 2, 2026.

2026	2027	2028	2029	2030	2031	2032	2033	2034	2035	2036	2037
New Hampshire	at Penn State	Penn State	Morgan State					at Notre Dame			Notre Dame
Toledo	at UConn	UConn	at Toledo								
at UConn	Fordham	Colgate	Notre Dame								
Notre Dame											
