= 1979 Syracuse Orangemen football team =

American college football season

1979 Syracuse Orangemen football

Independence Bowl champion

Independence Bowl, W 31–7 vs. McNeese State
- Conference: Independent
- Record: 7–5
- Head coach: Frank Maloney (6th season)
- Offensive coordinator: Tom Coughlin (4th season)
- Captains: Jim Collins; Bill Hurley; Craig Wolfley
- Home stadium: Giants Stadium; Rich Stadium; Schoellkopf Field

1979 NCAA Division I-A independents football records
	Conf.					Overall
Team	W		L		T	W		L		T
No. 6 Florida State		–		–		11	–	1	–	0
No. 7 Pittsburgh		–		–		11	–	1	–	0
UNLV		–		–		9	–	1	–	2
No. 17 Temple		–		–		10	–	2	–	0
Tulane		–		–		9	–	3	–	0
Rutgers		–		–		8	–	3	–	0
Tennessee State		–		–		8	–	3	–	0
East Carolina		–		–		7	–	3	–	1
No. 20 Penn State		–		–		8	–	4	–	0
South Carolina		–		–		8	–	4	–	0
Navy		–		–		7	–	4	–	0
Notre Dame		–		–		7	–	4	–	0
Southern Miss		–		–		6	–	4	–	1
Syracuse		–		–		7	–	5	–	0
Colgate		–		–		5	–	4	–	1
Boston College		–		–		5	–	6	–	0
Holy Cross		–		–		5	–	6	–	0
Memphis State		–		–		5	–	6	–	0
Miami (FL)		–		–		5	–	6	–	0
North Texas State		–		–		5	–	6	–	0
Villanova		–		–		5	–	6	–	0
Virginia Tech		–		–		5	–	6	–	0
West Virginia		–		–		5	–	6	–	0
Georgia Tech		–		–		4	–	6	–	1
Louisville		–		–		4	–	6	–	1
William & Mary		–		–		4	–	7	–	0
Illinois State		–		–		3	–	8	–	0
Northeast Louisiana		–		–		3	–	8	–	0
Army		–		–		2	–	8	–	1
Air Force		–		–		2	–	9	–	0
Cincinnati		–		–		2	–	9	–	0
Richmond		–		–		0	–	11	–	0
Rankings from AP Poll

The 1979 Syracuse Orangemen football team represented Syracuse University as an independent during the 1979 NCAA Division I-A football season. The team was led by sixth-year head coach Frank Maloney. Due to the ongoing construction of Syracuse's new stadium, the Carrier Dome, home games in 1979 were played in various locations in New York and New Jersey. The Orangemen were invited to the 1979 Independence Bowl, where they defeated McNeese State, 31–7.

== Schedule ==
Date	Opponent	Site	Result	Attendance	Source
September 8	at Ohio State	Ohio Stadium; Columbus, OH	L 8–31	86,205	
September 15	West Virginia	Giants Stadium; East Rutherford, NJ (rivalry)	W 24–14	10,375	
September 22	at Northwestern	Dyche Stadium; Evanston, IL	W 54–21	20,121	
September 29	Washington State	Rich Stadium; Orchard Park, NY	W 52–25	10,004	
October 6	at Kansas	Memorial Stadium; Lawrence, KS	W 45–27	36,720	
October 13	at Temple	Veterans Stadium; Philadelphia, PA	L 17–49	18,504	
October 20	Penn State	Giants Stadium; East Rutherford, NJ (rivalry)	L 7–35	53,789	
October 27	Miami (FL)	Rich Stadium; Orchard Park, NY	W 25–15	7,729	
November 3	at No. 12 Pittsburgh	Pitt Stadium; Pittsburgh, PA (rivalry)	L 21–28	43,005	
November 10	at Navy	Navy–Marine Corps Memorial Stadium; Annapolis, MD	W 30–14	20,385	
November 17	Boston College	Schoellkopf Field; Ithaca, NY	L 10–27	20,245	
December 15	vs. McNeese State	State Fair Stadium; Shreveport, LA (Independence Bowl)	W 31–7	27,234	
Rankings from AP Poll released prior to the game

== Roster ==
1979 Syracuse Orange football team roster
Players
Coaches
Offense

Pos.	#	Name	Class
OT	50	Bruce Babcock	Jr
C	52	Gerry Feehery	Fr
TE	84	Mike Feldman	Fr
QB	8	Jeff Fischer	Fr
OT	59	Andrew Gissinger	Jr
G	78	Gordon Grownkowski	So
RB	36	Dennis Hartman	Jr
G	61	Tony Hazzan	So
C	54	Joe Hodges	Sr
QB	5	Bill Hurley	Sr
WR	29	Brian Ishman	Jr
RB	49	Chris Jilleba	Fr
G	66	John Lally	So
RB	41	Ken Mandeville	Jr
RB	31	Tom Matichak	Sr
OT	79	John McCollom	So
WR	45	Art Monk	Sr
WR	13	Dennis Morgis	Fr
WR	86	Frank Marone	Fr
RB	47	Joe Morris	So
G	63	Joe Nett	Fr
TE	81	Tony Sidor	Jr
QB	11	Dave Warner	So
WR	40	Greg Williams	Sr
QB	9	Tim Wilson	Jr
G	64	Craig Wolfley	Sr
WR	17	Paul Zambuto	So

Defense

Pos.	#	Name	Class
DB	20	Bob Arkellpane	Jr
LB	57	Craig Bingham	So
DB	32	Ike Bogasian	So
DE	94	John Cameron	Sr
DE	70	Mike Charles	Fr
LB	33	Jim Collins	Jr
DT	83	Mike Connors	So
DB	22	Derek Frederickson	Fr
DE	82	Michael Gyetvay	Jr
DB	34	Fran Hagerty
DB	3	Warren Harvey	Sr
DB	18	Cedric Hinton	So
DB	19	Jerry Kilpatrick	So
DE	43	John Kinley	Sr
LB	58	Ken Kollar	Jr
LB	97	Fred Lang	Jr
LB	55	Glen Lewis	Fr
DE	95	Robert Manning	Fr
DT	75	Guy Neugebauer	Jr
LB	30	Guy Ruff	So
LB	26	Thomas Seibert	So
DE	92	Chris Shaffer	Sr
LB	56	Richard Sidor	Fr
DB	15	Russ Spitz	So
LB	38	Kevin Yard	Jr
LB	48	Mike Zunic	Jr

Special teams

Pos.	#	Name	Class
K	1	Gary Anderson	So
P	99	Joe Goodwill	Jr
P	12	John White	Fr

Head coach

- Frank Maloney

Coordinators/assistant coaches

Legend

- (C) Team captain
- (S) Suspended
- (I) Ineligible
- Injured
- Redshirt

== Team players in the NFL ==
Player	Position	Round	Pick	NFL club
Art Monk	Wide receiver	1	18	Washington Redskins
Bill Hurley	Safety	4	110	Pittsburgh Steelers
Craig Wolfley	Guard	5	138	Pittsburgh Steelers
