= 1979 Independence Bowl =

Syracuse Orangemen	McNeese State Cowboys
(6–5)	(11–0)
Independent	Southland Conference
31	7
Head coach: Frank Maloney	Head coach: Ernie Duplechin
	1	2	3	4	Total
Syracuse	0	3	7	21	31
McNeese State	0	0	7	0	7
- Date: December 15, 1979
- Season: 1979
- Stadium: State Fair Stadium
- Location: Shreveport, Louisiana
- MVP: RB Joe Morris, Syracuse; DT Clay Carroll, McNeese State
- Attendance: 27,234

United States TV coverage
- Network: Channel 17 (Atlanta)
- Announcers: Pete Van Wieren & Billy Kilmer

The 1979 Independence Bowl was a college football postseason bowl game between the McNeese State Cowboys and the Syracuse Orangemen.

== Background ==
This was McNeese State's 2nd Southland Conference title in three years. This was Syracuse's first bowl game since 1966.

== Game summary ==
Gary Anderson gave the Orangemen a 3–0 lead on his 40-yard kick in the second quarter that proved to be the halftime lead. Ken Mandeville made it 10–0 on his 1-yard run. McNeese State retaliated with a Chad Millet touchdown run to make it 10–7 going into the fourth quarter. A 15 play, 73-yard drive culminated with an Art Monk touchdown catch from Bill Hurley. Hurley added in a touchdown run to make it 24–7. Tom Matichak made it 31–7 on a touchdown run of his own to seal off the scoring and give the Orangement the win. Joe Morris ran for 155 yards on 33 carries for Syracuse in their first bowl win since 1961.

== Aftermath ==
McNeese made one more bowl appearance in 1980, in the Independence Bowl. Syracuse made four more bowl appearances in the decade. They have not returned to the Independence Bowl since this game.

== Statistics ==
Statistics	Syracuse	McNeese State
First downs	23	13
Rushing yards	276	127
Passing yards	51	102
Interceptions	0	3
Total yards	327	229
Fumbles–lost	1–0	5–1
Penalties–yards	2–10	1–3
Punts–average	4–36.0	3–43.7
