= 2022 Pinstripe Bowl =

Postseason college football bowl game

2022 Bad Boy Mowers Pinstripe Bowl
- 12th Pinstripe Bowl
Syracuse Orange	Minnesota Golden Gophers
(7–5)	(8–4)
ACC	Big Ten
20	28
Head coach: Dino Babers	Head coach: P. J. Fleck
	1	2	3	4	Total
Syracuse	0	7	6	7	20
Minnesota	0	14	14	0	28
- Date: December 29, 2022
- Season: 2022
- Stadium: Yankee Stadium
- Location: Bronx, New York
- MVP: Coleman Bryson (S, Minnesota)
- Favorite: Minnesota by 10.5
- Referee: Scott Campbell (Big 12)
- Attendance: 31,131
- Payout: US$4,400,000

United States TV coverage
- Network: ESPN
- Announcers: Wes Durham (play-by-play), Roddy Jones (analyst), and Taylor Davis (sideline)

The 2022 Pinstripe Bowl was a college football bowl game played on December 29, 2022, at Yankee Stadium in The Bronx, New York. The 12th annual Pinstripe Bowl, the game featured the Syracuse Orange and the Minnesota Golden Gophers, teams from the Atlantic Coast Conference and the Big Ten Conference, respectively. The game began at 2:03 p.m. EST and was aired on ESPN. It was one of the 2022–23 bowl games concluding the 2022 FBS football season. Sponsored by lawn mower manufacturing company Bad Boy Mowers, the game was officially known as the Bad Boy Mowers Pinstripe Bowl.

== Teams ==
The game featured Syracuse and Minnesota. This was the sixth meeting between the programs; Minnesota led the all-time series, 3–2. It was also their second bowl meeting, as they played in the 2013 Texas Bowl, won by Syracuse.

=== Syracuse ===
Syracuse compiled a 7–5 regular-season record, 4–4 in conference play. The opened their season with six consecutive wins, and were ranked as high as No. 14 before losing five games in a row. The Orange faced three ranked teams, defeating NC State while losing to Clemson and Florida State.

=== Minnesota ===
Minnesota finished their regular season with a 8–4 record, 5–4 in conference play. The opened their season with four consecutive wins, and were ranked No. 21 before losing their next three games. Two of those losses were to ranked opponents; Illinois and Penn State. The Golden Gophers ended their regular season with four wins in five games.

== Game summary ==
2022 Bad Boy Mowers Pinstripe Bowl

Quarter	1	2	3	4	Total
Syracuse	0	7	6	7	20
Minnesota	0	14	14	0	28

at Yankee Stadium • Bronx, New York

- Date: Thursday, December 29, 2022
- Game time: 2:00 p.m. EST
- Game weather: Sunny • Temperature: 39 °F (4 °C) • Wind: 8 mph (13 km/h) southwest
- Game attendance: 31,131
- Referee: Scott Campbell
- TV announcers (ESPN): Wes Durham (play-by-play), Roddy Jones (analyst), and Taylor Davis (sideline)
- Box score

Scoring summary

Quarter	Time	Drive			Team	Scoring information	Score	
Quarter	Time	Plays	Yards	TOP	Team	Scoring information	Syracuse	Minnesota
2	13:39	9	62	4:33	Minnesota	Mohamed Ibrahim 4-yard touchdown run, Matthew Trickett kick good	0	7
2	6:39	9	62	4:02	Minnesota	Daniel Jackson 20-yard touchdown reception from Tanner Morgan, Matthew Trickett kick good	0	14
2	0:08	5	86	0:47	Syracuse	Garrett Shrader 1-yard touchdown run, Andre Szmyt kick good	7	14
3	10:26	9	65	4:34	Syracuse	40-yard field goal by Andre Szmyt	10	14
3	7:22	4	49	1:33	Minnesota	Interception returned 70 yards for touchdown by Coleman Bryson, Matthew Trickett kick good	10	21
3	1:38	13	53	5:44	Syracuse	38-yard field goal by Andre Szmyt	13	21
3	0:35	2	25	1:03	Minnesota	Daniel Jackson 25-yard touchdown reception from Tanner Morgan, Matthew Trickett kick good	13	28
4	2:30	10	63	2:03	Syracuse	Garrett Shrader 8-yard touchdown run, Andre Smyzt kick good	20	28
"TOP" = time of possession. For other American football terms, see Glossary of American football.							20	28

== Statistics ==
Team statistical comparison
Statistic	Syracuse	Minnesota
First downs	27	14
First downs rushing	11	5
First downs passing	15	8
First downs penalty	1	1
Third down efficiency	7–16	5–11
Fourth down efficiency	1–3	0–0
Total plays–net yards	86–484	49–215
Rushing attempts–net yards	35–154	33–77
Yards per rush	4.4	2.3
Yards passing	330	138
Pass completions–attempts	32–51	11–16
Interceptions thrown	1	0
Punt returns–total yards	2–26	0–0
Kickoff returns–total yards	3–71	3–118
Punts–average yardage	4–28.5	6–43.0
Fumbles–lost	2–1	1–0
Penalties–yards	6–41	2–20
Time of possession	34:11	25:49

Syracuse statistics
Orange passing
	C–A	Yds	TD–INT
Garrett Shrader	32–51	330	0–1
Orange rushing
	Car	Yds	TD
LeQuint Allen	15	94	0
Garrett Shrader	14	38	2
Trebor Pena	2	8	0
Juwaun Price	3	7	0
Orange receiving
	Rec	Yds	TD
Devaughn Cooper	7	114	0
Oronde Gadsden II	7	78	0
LeQuint Allen	11	60	0
Damien Alford	3	57	0
Trebor Pena	3	12	0
D'Marcus Adams	1	9	0

Minnesota statistics
Golden Gophers passing
	C–A	Yds	TD–INT
Athan Kaliakmanis	7–9	80	0–0
Tanner Morgan	4-7	58	2-0
Golden Gophers rushing
	Car	Yds	TD
Mohamed Ibrahim	16	71	1
Trey Potts	9	27	0
Bryce Williams	2	6	0
TEAM	2	-8	0
Tanner Morgan	2	-8	0
Athan Kaliakmanis	2	-11	0
Golden Gophers receiving
	Rec	Yds	TD
Daniel Jackson	4	73	2
Le'Meke Brockington	2	27	0
Brevyn Spann-Ford	2	16	0
Dylan Wright	2	14	0
Bryce Williams	1	8	0
