= 2022 Syracuse Orange football team =

American college football season

2022 Syracuse Orange football

Pinstripe Bowl, L 20–28 vs. Minnesota
- Conference: Atlantic Coast Conference
- Atlantic Division
- Record: 7–6 (4–4 ACC)
- Head coach: Dino Babers (7th season)
- Offensive coordinator: Robert Anae (1st season)
- Offensive scheme: Veer and shoot
- Defensive coordinator: Tony White (3rd season)
- Base defense: 3–3–5
- Home stadium: JMA Wireless Dome

Uniform
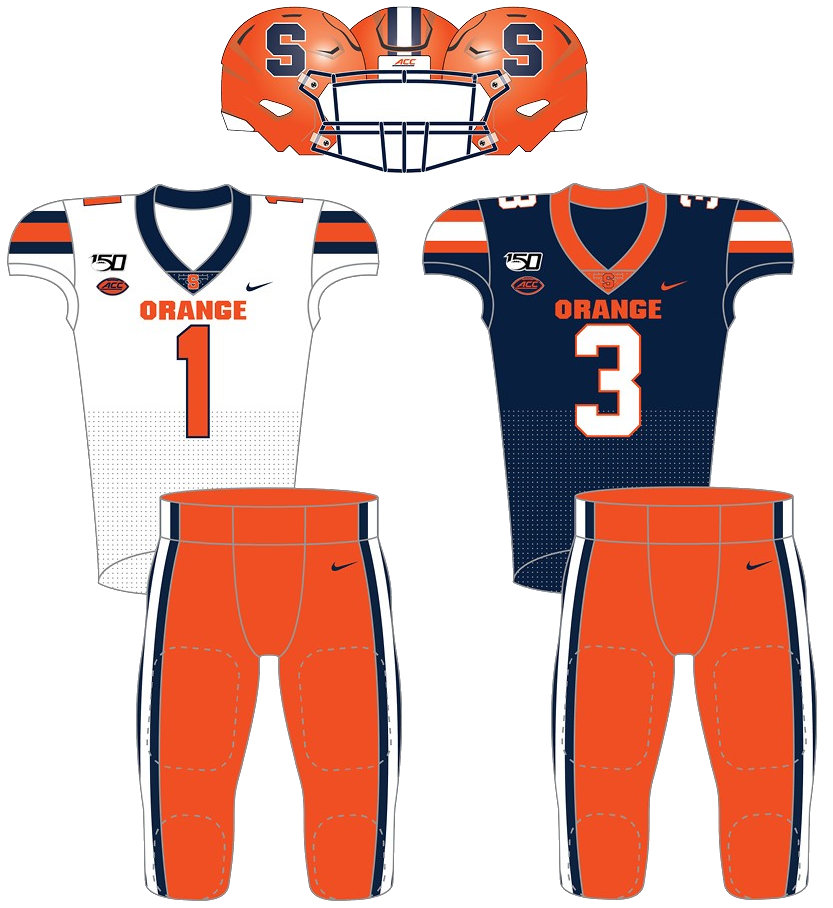

2022 Atlantic Coast Conference football standings
| | Conf. | | | Overall |
| Team | W | | L | W | | L |
|---|---|---|---|---|---|---|
Atlantic Division
| No. 13 Clemson xy$ | 8 | – | 0 | 11 | – | 3 |
| No. 11 Florida State | 5 | – | 3 | 10 | – | 3 |
| Louisville | 4 | – | 4 | 8 | – | 5 |
| NC State | 4 | – | 4 | 8 | – | 5 |
| Syracuse | 4 | – | 4 | 7 | – | 6 |
| Wake Forest | 3 | – | 5 | 8 | – | 5 |
| Boston College | 2 | – | 6 | 3 | – | 9 |
Coastal Division
| North Carolina xy | 6 | – | 2 | 9 | – | 5 |
| Duke | 5 | – | 3 | 9 | – | 4 |
| No. 22 Pittsburgh | 5 | – | 3 | 9 | – | 4 |
| Georgia Tech | 4 | – | 4 | 5 | – | 7 |
| Miami (FL) | 3 | – | 5 | 5 | – | 7 |
| Virginia | 1 | – | 6 | 3 | – | 7 |
| Virginia Tech | 1 | – | 6 | 3 | – | 8 |
Championship: Clemson 39, North Carolina 10
$ – Conference champion; x – Division champion/co-champions; y – Championship game participant; Rankings from AP Poll

The 2022 Syracuse Orange football team represented Syracuse University during the 2022 NCAA Division I FBS football season. The Orange were led by seventh-year head coach Dino Babers and played their home games at the JMA Wireless Dome, competing as members of the Atlantic Coast Conference.

After being picked to finish last in the preseason media poll, Syracuse went 7–6, 4–4 in ACC play to finish in 5th place in the Atlantic Division. The Orange started the season 6–0 for the first time since their undefeated 1987 season, and were ranked as high as No. 14 before losing five games in a row. The Orange faced three ranked teams, defeating NC State while losing to Clemson and Florida State. They were invited to the Pinstripe Bowl, where they lost to Minnesota.

== Schedule ==
The ACC released their schedule on January 31, 2022.

| Date | Time | Opponent | Rank | Site | TV | Result | Attendance |
|---|---|---|---|---|---|---|---|
| September 3 | 8:00 p.m. | Louisville | | JMA Wireless Dome; Syracuse, NY | ACCN | W 31–7 | 37,110 |
| September 10 | 7:00 p.m. | at UConn* | | Rentschler Field; East Hartford, CT (rivalry) | CBSSN | W 48–14 | 25,114 |
| September 17 | 12:00 p.m. | Purdue* | | JMA Wireless Dome; Syracuse, NY | ESPN2 | W 32–29 | 35,493 |
| September 23 | 7:00 p.m. | Virginia | | JMA Wireless Dome; Syracuse, NY | ESPN | W 22–20 | 34,590 |
| October 1 | 5:00 p.m. | Wagner* | | JMA Wireless Dome; Syracuse, NY | ACCNX/ESPN+ | W 59–0 | 33,373 |
| October 15 | 3:30 p.m. | No. 15 NC State | No. 18 | JMA Wireless Dome; Syracuse, NY | ACCN | W 24–9 | 49,705 |
| October 22 | 12:00 p.m. | at No. 5 Clemson | No. 14 | Memorial Stadium; Clemson, SC | ABC | L 21–27 | 81,500 |
| October 29 | 12:00 p.m. | Notre Dame* | No. 16 | JMA Wireless Dome; Syracuse, NY | ABC | L 24–41 | 49,861 |
| November 5 | 3:30 p.m. | at Pittsburgh | No. 22 | Acrisure Stadium; Pittsburgh, PA (rivalry) | ACCN | L 9–19 | 50,888 |
| November 12 | 8:00 p.m. | No. 23 Florida State | | JMA Wireless Dome; Syracuse, NY | ACCN | L 3–38 | 45,213 |
| November 19 | 8:00 p.m. | at Wake Forest | | Truist Field at Wake Forest; Winston-Salem, NC | ACCN | L 35–45 | 26,164 |
| November 26 | 7:30 p.m. | at Boston College | | Alumni Stadium; Chestnut Hill, MA | ACCRSN | W 32–23 | 30,113 |
| December 29 | 2:00 p.m. | vs. Minnesota* | | Yankee Stadium; Bronx, NY (Pinstripe Bowl) | ESPN | L 20–28 | 31,131 |
*Non-conference game; Rankings from AP Poll (and CFP Rankings, after November 2) - Released prior to game; All times are in Eastern time

== Game summaries ==
=== Louisville ===
| | 1 | 2 | 3 | 4 | Total |
|---|---|---|---|---|---|
| Cardinals | 7 | 0 | 0 | 0 | 7 |
| Orange | 10 | 7 | 0 | 14 | 31 |

| Statistics | LOU | SYR |
|---|---|---|
| First downs | 15 | 23 |
| Total yards | 334 | 449 |
| Rushing yards | 137 | 208 |
| Passing yards | 197 | 241 |
| Turnovers | 3 | 0 |
| Time of possession | 27:29 | 32:31 |

| Team | Category | Player | Statistics |
|---|---|---|---|
| Louisville | Passing | Malik Cunningham | 16/22, 152 yards, 2 INT |
| Louisville | Rushing | Tiyon Evans | 13 rushes, 89 yards, TD |
| Louisville | Receiving | Tyler Hudson | 8 receptions, 102 yards |
| Syracuse | Passing | Garrett Shrader | 18/25, 236 yards, 2 TD |
| Syracuse | Rushing | Sean Tucker | 21 rushes, 100 yards, TD |
| Syracuse | Receiving | Sean Tucker | 6 receptions, 84 yards, TD |

=== At UConn ===
| | 1 | 2 | 3 | 4 | Total |
|---|---|---|---|---|---|
| Orange | 17 | 10 | 14 | 7 | 48 |
| Huskies | 0 | 7 | 7 | 0 | 14 |

| Statistics | SYR | CONN |
|---|---|---|
| First downs | 29 | 10 |
| Total yards | 470 | 202 |
| Rushing yards | 156 | 97 |
| Passing yards | 314 | 105 |
| Turnovers | 0 | 2 |
| Time of possession | 34:52 | 25:08 |

| Team | Category | Player | Statistics |
|---|---|---|---|
| Syracuse | Passing | Garrett Shrader | 20/23, 292 yards, 3 TD |
| Syracuse | Rushing | Sean Tucker | 27 rushes, 112 yards, TD |
| Syracuse | Receiving | Damien Alford | 1 reception, 47 yards, TD |
| UConn | Passing | Zion Turner | 14/17, 92 yards, TD |
| UConn | Rushing | Nate Carter | 16 rushes, 71 yards |
| UConn | Receiving | Aaron Turner | 6 receptions, 71 yards, TD |

=== Purdue ===
| | 1 | 2 | 3 | 4 | Total |
|---|---|---|---|---|---|
| Boilermakers | 6 | 3 | 0 | 20 | 29 |
| Orange | 3 | 0 | 7 | 22 | 32 |

| Statistics | PUR | SYR |
|---|---|---|
| First downs | 25 | 23 |
| Total yards | 485 | 306 |
| Rushing yards | 61 | 125 |
| Passing yards | 424 | 181 |
| Turnovers | 1 | 0 |
| Time of possession | 32:25 | 27:35 |

| Team | Category | Player | Statistics |
|---|---|---|---|
| Purdue | Passing | Aidan O'Connell | 39/56, 424 yards, 3 TD, INT |
| Purdue | Rushing | Devin Mockobee | 7 rushes, 22 yards, TD |
| Purdue | Receiving | Charlie Jones | 11 receptions, 188 yards, TD |
| Syracuse | Passing | Garrett Shrader | 13/29, 181 yards, 3 TD |
| Syracuse | Rushing | Garrett Shrader | 17 rushes, 83 yards |
| Syracuse | Receiving | Oronde Gadsden II | 6 receptions, 112 yards, 2 TD |

=== Virginia ===
| | 1 | 2 | 3 | 4 | Total |
|---|---|---|---|---|---|
| Cavaliers | 0 | 0 | 13 | 7 | 20 |
| Orange | 10 | 6 | 3 | 3 | 22 |

| Statistics | UVA | SYR |
|---|---|---|
| First downs | 17 | 21 |
| Total yards | 287 | 352 |
| Rushing yards | 149 | 75 |
| Passing yards | 138 | 277 |
| Turnovers | 2 | 4 |
| Time of possession | 25:10 | 34:50 |

| Team | Category | Player | Statistics |
|---|---|---|---|
| Virginia | Passing | Brennan Armstrong | 19/38, 138 yards, TD, INT |
| Virginia | Rushing | Perris Jones | 13 rushes, 87 yards, TD |
| Virginia | Receiving | Keytaon Thompson | 8 receptions, 55 yards |
| Syracuse | Passing | Garrett Shrader | 22/33, 277 yards, INT |
| Syracuse | Rushing | Sean Tucker | 21 rushes, 60 yards |
| Syracuse | Receiving | Oronde Gadsden II | 7 receptions, 107 yards |

=== Wagner ===
| | 1 | 2 | 3 | 4 | Total |
|---|---|---|---|---|---|
| Seahawks | 0 | 0 | 0 | 0 | 0 |
| Orange | 21 | 28 | 7 | 3 | 59 |

| Statistics | WAG | SYR |
|---|---|---|
| First downs | 4 | 26 |
| Total yards | 50 | 631 |
| Rushing yards | 31 | 388 |
| Passing yards | 19 | 243 |
| Turnovers | 1 | 0 |
| Time of possession | 24:11 | 25:49 |

| Team | Category | Player | Statistics |
|---|---|---|---|
| Wagner | Passing | Ryan Kraft | 2/6, 19 yards, INT |
| Wagner | Rushing | Zach Palmer-Smith | 8 rushes, 31 yards |
| Wagner | Receiving | Julian Jordan | 1 reception, 15 yards |
| Syracuse | Passing | Garrett Shrader | 17/17, 238 yards, 2 TD |
| Syracuse | Rushing | Sean Tucker | 23 rushes, 232 yards, 3 TD |
| Syracuse | Receiving | Oronde Gadsden II | 4 receptions, 66 yards |

=== No. 15 NC State ===
| | 1 | 2 | 3 | 4 | Total |
|---|---|---|---|---|---|
| No. 15 Wolfpack | 3 | 0 | 3 | 3 | 9 |
| No. 18 Orange | 7 | 3 | 7 | 7 | 24 |

| Statistics | NCST | SYR |
|---|---|---|
| First downs | 16 | 20 |
| Total yards | 255 | 389 |
| Rushing yards | 95 | 179 |
| Passing yards | 160 | 210 |
| Turnovers | 0 | 2 |
| Time of possession | 35:06 | 24:54 |

| Team | Category | Player | Statistics |
|---|---|---|---|
| NC State | Passing | Jack Chambers | 18/30, 160 yards |
| NC State | Rushing | Jack Chambers | 19 rushes, 58 yards |
| NC State | Receiving | Keyon Lesane | 4 receptions, 39 yards |
| Syracuse | Passing | Garrett Shrader | 16/25, 210 yards, 2 TD, 2 INT |
| Syracuse | Rushing | Sean Tucker | 14 rushes, 98 yards, TD |
| Syracuse | Receiving | Oronde Gadsden II | 8 receptions, 141 yards, 2 TD |

=== At No. 5 Clemson ===
| | 1 | 2 | 3 | 4 | Total |
|---|---|---|---|---|---|
| No. 14 Orange | 7 | 14 | 0 | 0 | 21 |
| No. 5 Tigers | 7 | 3 | 0 | 17 | 27 |

| Statistics | SYR | CLEM |
|---|---|---|
| First downs | 17 | 27 |
| Total yards | 291 | 450 |
| Rushing yards | 124 | 293 |
| Passing yards | 167 | 157 |
| Turnovers | 1 | 4 |
| Time of possession | 26:06 | 33:54 |

| Team | Category | Player | Statistics |
|---|---|---|---|
| Syracuse | Passing | Garrett Shrader | 18/26, 167 yards, TD, INT |
| Syracuse | Rushing | Garrett Shrader | 21 rushes, 71 yards, TD |
| Syracuse | Receiving | Oronde Gadsden II | 6 receptions, 86 yards |
| Clemson | Passing | DJ Uiagalelei | 13/21, 138 yards, 2 INT |
| Clemson | Rushing | Will Shipley | 27 rushes, 172 yards, 2 TD |
| Clemson | Receiving | Joseph Ngata | 3 receptions, 50 yards |

=== Notre Dame ===
| | 1 | 2 | 3 | 4 | Total |
|---|---|---|---|---|---|
| Fighting Irish | 7 | 14 | 3 | 17 | 41 |
| No. 16 Orange | 7 | 0 | 10 | 7 | 24 |

| Statistics | ND | SYR |
|---|---|---|
| First downs | 22 | 15 |
| Total yards | 362 | 286 |
| Rushing yards | 246 | 61 |
| Passing yards | 116 | 225 |
| Turnovers | 1 | 2 |
| Time of possession | 37:40 | 22:20 |

| Team | Category | Player | Statistics |
|---|---|---|---|
| Notre Dame | Passing | Drew Pyne | 9/19, 116 yards, TD, INT |
| Notre Dame | Rushing | Audric Estimé | 20 rushes, 123 yards, 2 TD |
| Notre Dame | Receiving | Michael Mayer | 3 receptions, 54 yards |
| Syracuse | Passing | Carlos Del Rio-Wilson | 11/22, 190 yards, TD, INT |
| Syracuse | Rushing | Sean Tucker | 16 rushes, 60 yards, TD |
| Syracuse | Receiving | Oronde Gadsden II | 4 receptions, 78 yards, TD |

=== At Pittsburgh ===
| | 1 | 2 | 3 | 4 | Total |
|---|---|---|---|---|---|
| No. 20 Orange | 3 | 3 | 0 | 3 | 9 |
| Panthers | 0 | 10 | 7 | 2 | 19 |

| Statistics | SYR | PITT |
|---|---|---|
| First downs | 9 | 18 |
| Total yards | 145 | 337 |
| Rushing yards | 25 | 161 |
| Passing yards | 120 | 176 |
| Turnovers | 0 | 2 |
| Time of possession | 23:15 | 36:45 |

| Team | Category | Player | Statistics |
|---|---|---|---|
| Syracuse | Passing | Carlos Del Rio-Wilson | 8/23, 120 yards |
| Syracuse | Rushing | Sean Tucker | 10 rushes, 19 yards |
| Syracuse | Receiving | Damien Alford | 2 receptions, 48 yards |
| Pittsburgh | Passing | Kedon Slovis | 16/23, 176 yards, INT |
| Pittsburgh | Rushing | Rodney Hammond Jr. | 28 rushes, 124 yards, TD |
| Pittsburgh | Receiving | Jared Wayne | 6 receptions, 102 yards |

=== No. 23 Florida State ===
| | 1 | 2 | 3 | 4 | Total |
|---|---|---|---|---|---|
| No. 23 Seminoles | 14 | 10 | 0 | 10 | 34 |
| Orange | 0 | 3 | 0 | 0 | 3 |

| Statistics | FSU | SYR |
|---|---|---|
| First downs | 25 | 9 |
| Total yards | 420 | 160 |
| Rushing yards | 230 | 95 |
| Passing yards | 190 | 65 |
| Turnovers | 1 | 1 |
| Time of possession | 36:11 | 23:49 |

| Team | Category | Player | Statistics |
|---|---|---|---|
| Florida State | Passing | Jordan Travis | 21/23, 155 yards, 3 TD |
| Florida State | Rushing | Trey Benson | 18 rushes, 163 yards |
| Florida State | Receiving | Ja'Khi Douglas | 3 receptions, 43 yards |
| Syracuse | Passing | Garrett Shrader | 6/16, 65 yards |
| Syracuse | Rushing | Sean Tucker | 14 rushes, 52 yards |
| Syracuse | Receiving | Oronde Gadsden II | 1 reception, 29 yards |

=== At Wake Forest ===
| | 1 | 2 | 3 | 4 | Total |
|---|---|---|---|---|---|
| Orange | 7 | 14 | 0 | 14 | 35 |
| Demon Deacons | 3 | 21 | 7 | 14 | 45 |

| Statistics | SYR | WAKE |
|---|---|---|
| First downs | 21 | 36 |
| Total yards | 477 | 543 |
| Rushing yards | 120 | 212 |
| Passing yards | 357 | 331 |
| Turnovers | 1 | 0 |
| Time of possession | 25:07 | 34:53 |

| Team | Category | Player | Statistics |
|---|---|---|---|
| Syracuse | Passing | Garrett Shrader | 17/31, 324 yards, TD, INT |
| Syracuse | Rushing | Sean Tucker | 16 rushes, 106 yards, TD |
| Syracuse | Receiving | Oronde Gadsden II | 6 receptions, 85 yards |
| Wake Forest | Passing | Sam Hartman | 30/43, 331 yards, 4 TD |
| Wake Forest | Rushing | Christian Turner | 16 rushes, 69 yards |
| Wake Forest | Receiving | A. T. Perry | 10 receptions, 119 yards, 3 TD |

=== At Boston College ===
| | 1 | 2 | 3 | 4 | Total |
|---|---|---|---|---|---|
| Orange | 0 | 3 | 3 | 26 | 32 |
| Eagles | 10 | 0 | 0 | 13 | 23 |

| Statistics | SYR | BC |
|---|---|---|
| First downs | 23 | 22 |
| Total yards | 443 | 341 |
| Rushing yards | 158 | 89 |
| Passing yards | 285 | 252 |
| Turnovers | 1 | 2 |
| Time of possession | 31:56 | 28:04 |

| Team | Category | Player | Statistics |
|---|---|---|---|
| Syracuse | Passing | Garrett Shrader | 21/27, 285 yards, 2 TD |
| Syracuse | Rushing | Sean Tucker | 21 rushes, 125 yards, 2 TD |
| Syracuse | Receiving | Oronde Gadsden II | 6 receptions, 106 yards |
| Boston College | Passing | Emmett Morehead | 29/38, 252 yards, 2 TD |
| Boston College | Rushing | Patrick Garwo III | 25 rushes, 83 yards, TD |
| Boston College | Receiving | Zay Flowers | 8 receptions, 110 yards, 2 TD |

=== Vs. Minnesota (Pinstripe Bowl) ===
| | 1 | 2 | 3 | 4 | Total |
|---|---|---|---|---|---|
| Orange | 0 | 7 | 6 | 7 | 20 |
| Golden Gophers | 0 | 14 | 14 | 0 | 28 |

| Statistics | SYR | MINN |
|---|---|---|
| First downs | 27 | 14 |
| Total yards | 477 | 215 |
| Rushing yards | 147 | 77 |
| Passing yards | 330 | 138 |
| Turnovers | 1 | 0 |
| Time of possession | 34:03 | 25:57 |

| Team | Category | Player | Statistics |
|---|---|---|---|
| Syracuse | Passing | Garrett Shrader | 32/51, 330 yards, INT |
| Syracuse | Rushing | LeQuint Allen | 15 rushes, 94 yards |
| Syracuse | Receiving | Devaughn Cooper | 7 receptions, 114 yards |
| Minnesota | Passing | Athan Kaliakmanis | 7/9, 80 yards |
| Minnesota | Rushing | Mohamed Ibrahim | 16 rushes, 71 yards, TD |
| Minnesota | Receiving | Daniel Jackson | 4 receptions, 73 yards, 2 TD |

== Rankings ==
Ranking movements Legend: ██ Increase in ranking ██ Decrease in ranking — = Not ranked RV = Received votes
| | Week | | | | | | | | | | | | | | | |
| Poll | Pre | 1 | 2 | 3 | 4 | 5 | 6 | 7 | 8 | 9 | 10 | 11 | 12 | 13 | 14 | Final |
|---|---|---|---|---|---|---|---|---|---|---|---|---|---|---|---|---|
| AP | — | — | — | RV | RV | 22 | 18 | 14 | 16 | 22 | — | — | — | — | — | — |
| Coaches | — | RV | RV | RV | 25 | 21 | 18 | 14 | 16 | 22 | RV | — | — | — | — | — |
| CFP | Not released | | | | | | | | | 20 | — | — | — | — | — | Not released |

== Personnel ==
=== Coaching staff ===
Syracuse Orange football current coaching staff
| Name | Position | Years at Syracuse |
|---|---|---|
| Dino Babers | Head coach | 7th |
| Tony White | Defensive coordinator/linebacker coach | 3rd |
| Robert Anae | Offensive coordinator | 1st |
| Chris Achuff | Defensive line coach | 3rd |
| Jason Beck | Quarterbacks coach | 1st |
| Bob Ligashesky | Special teams coordinator | 1st |
| Mike Lynch | Running backs coach | 7th |
| Nick Monroe | Safeties/nickelbacks coach | 7th |
| Mike Schmidt | Offensive line coach | 2nd |
| Chip West | Cornerbacks coach | 3rd |
| Michael Johnson | Outside Receivers | 1st |
