= 2022 Minnesota Golden Gophers football team =

College football season

2022 Minnesota Golden Gophers football

Pinstripe Bowl champion

Pinstripe Bowl, W 28–20 vs. Syracuse
- Conference: Big Ten Conference
- Record: 9–4 (5–4 Big Ten)
- Head coach: P. J. Fleck (6th season)
- Offensive coordinator: Kirk Ciarrocca (4th season)
- Co-offensive coordinator: Matt Simon (3rd season)
- Offensive scheme: Spread option
- Defensive coordinator: Joe Rossi (5th season)
- Co-defensive coordinator: Paul Haynes (1st season)
- Base defense: 4–3
- Home stadium: Huntington Bank Stadium

2022 Big Ten Conference football standings
	Conf.			Overall
Team	W		L	W		L
East Division
No. 3 Michigan xy$^	9	–	0	13	–	1
No. 4 Ohio State ^	8	–	1	11	–	2
No. 7 Penn State	7	–	2	11	–	2
Maryland	4	–	5	8	–	5
Indiana	2	–	7	4	–	8
Rutgers	1	–	8	4	–	8
Michigan State†	0	–	6	0	–	7
West Division
Purdue xy	6	–	3	8	–	6
Illinois	5	–	4	8	–	5
Iowa	5	–	4	8	–	5
Minnesota	5	–	4	9	–	4
Wisconsin	4	–	5	7	–	6
Nebraska	3	–	6	4	–	8
Northwestern	1	–	8	1	–	11
Championship: Michigan 43, Purdue 22
^ – College Football Playoff participant; $ – Conference champion; x – Division champion/co-champions; y – Championship game participant; † — NCAA vacated all wins for Michigan State (5–7, 3–6); Rankings from AP Poll

The 2022 Minnesota Golden Gophers football team represented the University of Minnesota during the 2022 NCAA Division I FBS football season. The Golden Gophers played their home games at Huntington Bank Stadium in Minneapolis, Minnesota, and competed as members of the Big Ten Conference. They were led by head coach P. J. Fleck, in his sixth season.

== Offseason ==
Positions key
Offense	Defense	Special teams
QB — Quarterback; RB — Running back; FB — Fullback; WR — Wide receiver; TE — Tight end; OL — Offensive lineman; T — Tackle; G — Guard; C — Center	DL — Defensive lineman; DT — Defensive tackle (Note: Includes nose tackle (NT)); DE — Defensive end; EDGE — Edge rusher; LB — Linebacker (Note: Includes middle linebacker (MLB/MIKE), weakside linebacker (WILL), strongside linebacker (SAM), off-ball linebacker, and outside linebacker (OLB)); DB — Defensive back; CB — Cornerback; S — Safety (Note: Includes free safety (FS) and strong safety (SS))	K — Kicker (Note: Also known as a placekicker (PK)); P — Punter; LS — Long snapper; RS — Return specialist (Note: Includes kickoff and punt returners)

2022 Minnesota Golden Gophers incoming transfers
Name	No.	Pos.	Height	Weight	Year	Hometown	Prev. school
Beanie Bishop	#9	CB	5'10	185	(redshirt) Junior	Louisville, KY	Western Kentucky
Ryan Stapp	#22	CB	6'0	175	Junior	College Station, TX	Abilene Christian
Jacob Lewis	#48	K	6'2	207	Junior	Delaware, OH	Ball State
Chuck Filiaga	#76	OL	6'6	330	Graduate student	Aledo, TX	Michigan
Quinn Carroll	#77	OL	6'6	310	Graduate student	Edina, MN	Notre Dame
Darrell Jefferies	#90	DL	6'2	295	Graduate student	Covington, GA	Clemson
Kyler Baugh	#93	DL	6'2	300	Senior	Talihina, OK	Houston Baptist
Lorenza Surgers	#99	DL	6'5	275	Graduate student	Cary, NC	Vanderbilt

=== 2022 recruiting class ===
College recruiting
Name	Hometown	School	Height	Weight	Commit date
Zach Evans; RB	Heath, Texas	Rockwall-Heath High School	5 ft 10 in (1.78 m)	205 lb (93 kg)	Jun 11, 2021
Zach Evans; RB	Recruit ratings: Rivals: 247Sports: ESPN: (78)				
Hayden Schwartz; DT	Jacksonville, Florida	The Bolles School	6 ft 4 in (1.93 m)	245 lb (111 kg)	Dec 12, 2021
Hayden Schwartz; DT	Recruit ratings: Rivals: 247Sports: ESPN: (78)				
Cade McConnell; OL	Choctaw, Oklahoma	Choctaw High School	6 ft 5 in (1.96 m)	300 lb (140 kg)	Dec 12, 2021
Cade McConnell; OL	Recruit ratings: Rivals: 247Sports: ESPN: (77)				
Ike White; WR	Philadelphia, Pennsylvania	Saint Frances Academy	5 ft 11 in (1.80 m)	185 lb (84 kg)	Jun 16, 2021
Ike White; WR	Recruit ratings: Rivals: 247Sports: ESPN: (80)				
Rhyland Kelly; CB	Winnipeg, Manitoba, Canada	Clear Water Academy	6 ft 2 in (1.88 m)	180 lb (82 kg)	Jun 20, 2021
Rhyland Kelly; CB	Recruit ratings: Rivals: 247Sports: ESPN: (78)				
Tariq Watson; CB	Gretna, Louisiana	Helen Cox High School	5 ft 10 in (1.78 m)	170 lb (77 kg)	Jun 20, 2021
Tariq Watson; CB	Recruit ratings: Rivals: 247Sports: ESPN: (76)				
Coleman Bryson; S	Waynesville, North Carolina	Rabun Gap-Nacoochee School	6 ft 2 in (1.88 m)	200 lb (91 kg)	Mar 21, 2021
Coleman Bryson; S	Recruit ratings: Rivals: 247Sports: ESPN: (76)				
Maverick Baranowski; LB	Ponce Inlet, Florida	Spruce Creek High School	6 ft 3 in (1.91 m)	210 lb (95 kg)	Dec 12, 2021
Maverick Baranowski; LB	Recruit ratings: Rivals: 247Sports: ESPN: (72)				
Spencer Alvarez; TE	Columbia Heights, Minnesota	Columbia Heights High School	6 ft 6 in (1.98 m)	260 lb (120 kg)	Jun 10, 2021
Spencer Alvarez; TE	Recruit ratings: Rivals: 247Sports: ESPN: (72)				
Trey Bixby; DE	Eden Prairie, Minnesota	Eden Prairie High School	6 ft 4 in (1.93 m)	259 lb (117 kg)	Aug 13, 2020
Trey Bixby; DE	Recruit ratings: Rivals: 247Sports: ESPN: (80)				
Anthony Smith; DE	Shippensburg, Pennsylvania	Shippensburg High School	6 ft 6 in (1.98 m)	280 lb (130 kg)	Jun 21, 2021
Anthony Smith; DE	Recruit ratings: Rivals: 247Sports: ESPN: (78)				
Jacob Knuth; QB	Harrisburg, South Dakota	Harrisburg High School	6 ft 4 in (1.93 m)	205 lb (93 kg)	Feb 27, 2021
Jacob Knuth; QB	Recruit ratings: Rivals: 247Sports: ESPN: (78)				
Aidan Gousby; ATH	Lehigh Acres, Florida	Lehigh Senior High School	6 ft 0 in (1.83 m)	180 lb (82 kg)	Jun 20, 2021
Aidan Gousby; ATH	Recruit ratings: Rivals: 247Sports: ESPN: (79)				
Kristen Hoskins; WR	Alexandria, Minnesota	Alexandria High School	5 ft 9 in (1.75 m)	170 lb (77 kg)	Feb 19, 2021
Kristen Hoskins; WR	Recruit ratings: Rivals: 247Sports: ESPN: (77)				
Ashton Beers; OL	Slinger, Wisconsin	Slinger High School	6 ft 5 in (1.96 m)	300 lb (140 kg)	Dec 5, 2021
Ashton Beers; OL	Recruit ratings: Rivals: 247Sports: ESPN: (74)				
Tony Nelson; OT	Tracy, Minnesota	Tracy-Milory-Balaton High School	6 ft 6 in (1.98 m)	280 lb (130 kg)	Mar 7, 2021
Tony Nelson; OT	Recruit ratings: Rivals: 247Sports: ESPN: (73)				
Joey Gerlach; LB	Woodbury, Minnesota	Woodbury High School	6 ft 3 in (1.91 m)	205 lb (93 kg)	Nov 30, 2021
Joey Gerlach; LB	Recruit ratings: Rivals: 247Sports: ESPN: (74)				
Nathan Jones; OT / TE	Brock, Texas	Brock High School	6 ft 5 in (1.96 m)	235 lb (107 kg)	Oct 26, 2021
Nathan Jones; OT / TE	Recruit ratings: Rivals: 247Sports: ESPN: (74)				
Overall recruit ranking: Rivals: 49 247Sports: 53
Note: In many cases, Scout, Rivals, 247Sports, On3, and ESPN may conflict in their listings of height and weight.; In these cases, the average was taken. ESPN grades are on a 100-point scale.; Sources: "Rivals commits". Rivals.; "ESPN commits". ESPN.; "2022 Team Ranking". Rivals.com.; "247Sports commits". 247Sports.

== Roster ==
2022 Minnesota Golden Gophers football team roster
Players
Coaches
Offense

Pos.	#	Name	Class
WR	0	Le'Meke Brockington	Fr
WR	1	Ike White	Fr
QB	2	Tanner Morgan	GS
RB	3	Trey Potts	Jr
WR	5	Dylan Wright	Jr
QB	6	Jacob Knuth	Fr
WR	7	Chris Autman-Bell (injured)	GS
QB	8	Athan Kaliakmanis	Fr
WR	9	Daniel Jackson	Jr
QB	12	Cole Kramer	Jr
WR	13	Kristen Hoskins	Fr
WR	14	Evan Redding	Fr
WR	17	Cade Conzemius	Fr
WR	18	Clay Geary	GS
TE	19	Samuel Pickerign	GS
RB	20	Cole Berghorn	Fr
RB	21	Bryce Williams	Sr
WR	22	Mike Brown-Stephens	Jr
RB	24	Mohamed Ibrahim	GS
RB	25	Preston Jelen	Sr
RB	26	Zach Evans	Fr
WR	27	Quentin Redding	Fr
RB	30	Jordan Nubin	Fr
RB	33	Max Grand	Fr
TE	47	Wyatt Schroeder	So
OL	50	J. J. Guedet	Sr
OL	55	Karter Shaw	Sr
OL	57	Cameron James	Fr
OL	58	Jackson Hunter	Fr
OL	59	Tony Nelson	Fr
OL	60	John Michael Schmitz	GS
OL	65	Axel Ruschmeyer	Sr
OL	66	Nathan Boe	Sr
OL	68	Jackson Ruschmeyer	So
OL	69	Aireontae Ersery	So
OL	70	Cade McConnell	Fr
OL	71	Martes Lewis	So
OL	73	Tyrell Lawrence	So
OL	75	Tyler Cooper	Jr
OL	76	Chuck Filiaga	GS
OL	77	Quinn Carroll	GS
OL	78	Ashton Beers	Fr
OL	79	Logan Purcell	Fr
WR	80	Dino Kaliakmanis	Fr
TE	83	Spencer Alvarez	Fr
TE	84	Jack DiSano	Fr
TE	85	Frank Bierman	Jr
TE	86	Jameson Geers	Fr
TE	87	Nick Kallerup	Jr
TE	88	Brevyn Spann-Ford	Sr
TE	89	Nathan Jones	Fr

Defense

Pos.	#	Name	Class
DB	0	Jalen Glaze	So
DL	1	Trill Carter	Jr
DL	2	Gage Keys	So
DL	3	Austin Booker	Fr
DB	4	Terell Smith	GS
DB	5	Justin Walley	So
DB	6	Miles Fleming	So
DL	8	Thomas Rush	GS
DB	9	Beanie Bishop	Jr
DB	11	Michael Dixon	Jr
LB	13	Devon Williams	Fr
LB	14	Braelen Oliver	Sr
LB	15	Donald Williams	Jr
DB	16	Coleman Bryson	Fr
DL	17	Jah Joyner	So
DB	18	Rhyland Kelly	Fr
LB	19	Joey Gerlach	Fr
DB	20	Zach Jorgensen	Fr
DB	21	Steven Ortiz Jr.	Fr
DB	22	Ryan Stapp	Jr
DB	23	Jordan Howden	GS
DB	24	Tariq Watson	Fr
DB	25	Aidan Gousby	Fr
DB	25	Darius Green	Fr
DB	26	Victor Pless	So
DB	27	Tyler Nubin	Sr
DL	28	Colton Gregersen	Fr
LB	29	Josh Aune	Sr
LB	32	Maverick Baranowski	Fr
LB	34	Jack Tinnen	Fr
LB	35	Derik LeCaptain	Jr
LB	41	Cade Larson	Fr
DL	42	Jack Hawkinson	Fr
LB	43	Eli Mau	Fr
LB	44	Tyler Stolsky	Fr
LB	45	Cody Lindenberg	So
LB	46	Lucas Finnessy	So
DL	47	Hayden Schwartz	Fr
DL	52	Luther McCoy	Fr
LB	55	Mariano Sori-Marin	GS
DL	62	Jacob Schuster	Fr
DL	80	Anthony Smith	Fr
DL	89	Nate Becker	Fr
DL	90	Darnell Jefferies	GS
DL	91	Deven Eastern	Fr
DL	92	Danny Striggow	So
DL	93	Kyler Baugh	Sr
DL	96	Logan Richter	Jr
DL	97	Jalen Logan-Redding	So
DL	98	Trey Bixby	Fr
DL	99	Lorenza Surgers	GS

Special teams

Pos.	#	Name	Class
P	36	Ryan Shamburger	Jr
LS	37	Brady Weeks	Sr
K	48	Jacob Lewis	Jr
LS	49	Austin Sullivan	Jr
K	95	Matthew Trickett	GS
P	96	Mark Crawford	Jr
K	99	Dragan Kesich	Jr

Head coach

- P. J. Fleck (head coach)

Coordinators/assistant coaches

- Kirk Ciarrocca (offensive coordinator / quarterbacks)
- Matt Simon (co-offensive coordinator / wide receivers)
- Joe Rossi (defensive coordinator / linebackers)
- Paul Haynes (co-defensive coordinator / cornerbacks)
- Rob Wenger (special teams coordinator / outside linebackers)
- Kenni Burns (assistant head coach / running backs)
- Brian Callahan (run game coordinators / offensive line)
- Danny Collins (safeties)
- Brick Haley (defensive line)
- Greg Harbaugh Jr. (tight ends)
- Gerrit Chernoff (general manager)
- Dan Nichol (head strength & conditioning)
- Norries Wilson (director of player development)

Legend

- (C) Team captain
- (S) Suspended
- (I) Ineligible
- Injured
- Redshirt

Roster
Last update: June 23, 2022

== Schedule ==
Minnesota announced its 2022 football schedule on January 12, 2022. The 2022 schedule will consist of seven home games and five away games in the regular season. The Gophers will host Big Ten foes Purdue, Rutgers, Northwestern, and Iowa and will travel to Michigan State, Illinois, Penn State, Nebraska, and Wisconsin.

The Golden Gophers will host all of the three non-conference opponents, New Mexico State from the FBS Independents, Western Illinois from Division I FCS and Colorado from the Pac-12.

Date	Time	Opponent	Rank	Site	TV	Result	Attendance
September 1	8:00 p.m.	New Mexico State*		Huntington Bank Stadium; Minneapolis, MN	BTN	W 38–0	44,012
September 10	11:00 a.m.	Western Illinois*		Huntington Bank Stadium; Minneapolis, MN	BTN	W 62–10	43,859
September 17	2:30 p.m.	Colorado*		Huntington Bank Stadium; Minneapolis, MN	ESPN2	W 49–7	42,101
September 24	2:30 p.m.	at Michigan State		Spartan Stadium; East Lansing, MI	BTN	W 34–7	74,587
October 1	11:00 a.m.	Purdue^{†}	No. 21	Huntington Bank Stadium; Minneapolis, MN	ESPN2	L 10–20	48,288
October 15	11:00 a.m.	at No. 24 Illinois		Memorial Stadium; Champaign, IL	BTN	L 14–26	45,683
October 22	6:30 p.m.	at No. 16 Penn State		Beaver Stadium; University Park, PA (Governor's Victory Bell)	ABC	L 17–45	109,813
October 29	1:30 p.m.	Rutgers		Huntington Bank Stadium; Minneapolis, MN	BTN	W 31–0	49,368
November 5	11:00 a.m.	at Nebraska		Memorial Stadium; Lincoln, NE (rivalry)	ESPN2	W 20–13	86,284
November 12	2:30 p.m.	Northwestern		Huntington Bank Stadium; Minneapolis, MN	BTN	W 31–3	41,686
November 19	3:00 p.m.	Iowa		Huntington Bank Stadium; Minneapolis, MN (rivalry)	FOX	L 10–13	45,816
November 26	2:30 p.m.	at Wisconsin		Camp Randall Stadium; Madison, WI (rivalry)	ESPN	W 23–16	75,728
December 29	1:00 p.m.	vs. Syracuse*		Yankee Stadium; Bronx, NY (Pinstripe Bowl)	ESPN	W 28–20	31,131
*Non-conference game; ^{†}Homecoming; Rankings from AP Poll released prior to the game; All times are in Central time

== Game summaries ==
=== New Mexico State ===
New Mexico State Aggies at Minnesota Golden Gophers – Game summary

Quarter	1	2	3	4	Total
Aggies	0	0	0	0	0
Golden Gophers	7	17	14	0	38

at Huntington Bank Stadium, Minneapolis, Minnesota

- Date: September 1
- Game time: 7:00 p.m. MDT/8:00 p.m. CDT
- Game weather: Clear • Temperature: 83 °F (28 °C) • Wind: N 7 MPH
- Game attendance: 44,012
- Referee: Mark Kluczynski
- TV announcers (BTN): Mark Followill (play-by-play), Matt Millen (analyst), and Elise Menaker (sideline)
- Box score

Game information
First quarter
- MINN – Mohamed Ibrahim 4-yard run (Matthew Trickett kick), 9:50. Golden Gophers 7–0. Drive: 7 plays, 74 yards, 3:05.

Second quarter

- MINN – Mohamed Ibrahim 1-yard run (Matthew Trickett kick), 14:47. Golden Gophers 14–0. Drive: 13 plays, 64 yards, 12:58.
- MINN – Matthew Trickett 26-yard field goal, 8:26. Golden Gophers 17–0. Drive: 11 plays, 66 yards, 5:22.
- MINN – Tanner Morgan 1-yard run (Matthew Trickett kick), 0:19. Golden Gophers 24–0. Drive: 12 plays, 70 yards, 5:25.

Third quarter

- MINN – Tanner Morgan 1-yard run (Matthew Trickett kick), 6:31. Golden Gophers 31–0. Drive: 13 plays, 77 yards, 8:23.
- MINN – Trey Potts 1-yard run (Matthew Trickett kick), 0:09. Golden Gophers 38–0. Drive: 9 plays, 59 yards, 5:00.

Fourth quarter

- No scoring plays

Statistics

Statistics	NMSU	MINN
First downs	6	31
Total yards	91	485
Rushing yards	38	297
Passing yards	53	188
Turnovers	1	0
Time of possession	15:30	44:30

Team	Category	Player	Statistics
New Mexico State	Passing	Gavin Frakes	2/7, 43 yards, INT
New Mexico State	Rushing	Diego Pavia	3 rushes, 14 yards
New Mexico State	Receiving	Justice Powers	1 reception, 34 yards
Minnesota	Passing	Tanner Morgan	13/19, 174 yards
Minnesota	Rushing	Mohamed Ibrahim	21 rushes, 132 yards, 2 TD
Minnesota	Receiving	Mike Brown-Stephens	3 receptions, 52 yards

=== Western Illinois ===
	1	2	3	4	Total
Leathernecks	3	0	0	7	10
Golden Gophers	14	17	21	10	62

=== Colorado ===
Colorado Buffaloes (0–2) at Minnesota Golden Gophers (2–0) – Game summary

Quarter	1	2	3	4	Total
Buffaloes	0	0	0	7	7
Golden Gophers	14	21	7	7	49

at Huntington Bank Stadium • Minneapolis, MN

- Date: September 17, 2022
- Game time: 2:30 p.m. CST
- Game weather: Partly cloudy, 77 °F (25 °C)
- Game attendance: 42,101
- Referee: Ron Snodgrass
- TV announcers (ESPNews/ESPN): Beth Mowins (play-by-play), Kirk Morrison (analyst), and Stormy Buonantony (sideline)

Game information

First quarter

- (9:32) MINN – Mohamed Ibrahim 5-yard run, Matthew Trickett kick (Drive: 9 plays, 75 yards, 5:28; Minnesota 7–0)
- (8:44) MINN – Mohamed Ibrahim 2-yard run, Matthew Trickett kick (Drive: 2 plays, 11 yards, 0:42; Minnesota 14–0)

Second quarter

- (9:08) MINN – Mohamed Ibrahim 18-yard run, Matthew Trickett kick (Drive: 8 plays, 57 yards, 5:00; Minnesota 21–0)
- (1:37) MINN – Chris Autman-Bell 39-yard pass from Tanner Morgan, Matthew Trickett kick (Drive: 8 plays, 91 yards, 3:08; Minnesota 28–0)
- (0:08) MINN – Dylan Wright 16-yard pass from Tanner Morgan, Matthew Trickett kick (Drive: 8 plays, 53 yards, 0:57; Minnesota 35–0)

Third quarter

- (3:46) MINN – Clay Geary 8-yard pass from Tanner Morgan, Matthew Trickett kick (Drive: 10 plays, 60 yards, 6:29; Minnesota 42–0)

Fourth quarter

- (14:14) MINN – Bryce Williams 22-yard run, Matthew Trickett kick (Drive: 5 plays, 67 yards, 2:30; Minnesota 49–0)
- (8:55) COL – Austin Smith 4-yard pass from J. T. Shrout, Cole Becker kick (Drive: 10 plays, 75 yards, 5:19; Minnesota 49–7)

Statistics	COL	MINN
First downs	14	29
Total yards	226	500
Rushes/yards	34–136	52–334
Passing yards	90	166
Passing: Comp–Att–Int	10–24–0	12–20–1
Time of possession	23:53	36:07

Team	Category	Player	Statistics
Colorado	Passing	Owen McCown	4/7, 52 yards
Colorado	Rushing	Deion Smith	10 carries, 70 yards
Colorado	Receiving	Jaylon Jackson	1 reception, 28 yards
Minnesota	Passing	Tanner Morgan	11/16, 157 yards, 3 TD, INT
Minnesota	Rushing	Mohamed Ibrahim	23 carries, 202 yards, 3 TD
Minnesota	Receiving	Chris Autman-Bell	3 receptions, 58 yards, TD

=== At Michigan State ===
Week Four: Minnesota at Michigan State – Game summary

Quarter	1	2	3	4	Total
Golden Gophers	14	3	7	10	34
Spartans	0	0	0	7	7

at Spartan Stadium • East Lansing, MI

- Date: September 24, 2022
- Game time: 3:40 p.m.
- Game weather: 61 °F (16 °C), Cloudy, Wind: S 3 mph (4.8 km/h)
- Game attendance: 74,587
- Referee: Jeffrey Servinski
- TV announcers (BTN): Brandon Gaudin (play-by-play), Joshua Perry (analyst), and Rick Pizzo (sideline)

Game information

First Quarter

- (09:50) MINN TD: Mohamed Ibrahim 2-yard run (Matthew Trickett kick)
  MINN 7–0; 10 plays, 75 yards, 5:10
- (02:57) MINN TD: Daniel Jackson 23-yard pass from Tanner Morgan (Matthew Trickett kick)
  NINN 14–0; 9 plays, 77 yards, 5:01

Second Quarter

- (10:14) MINN FG: Matthew Trickett 26-yard field goal
  MINN 17–0; 12 plays, 66 yards, 6:15

Third Quarter

- (03:26) MINN TD: Nick Kallerup 6-yard pass from Tanner Mortgan
  MINN 24–0; 12 plays, 90 yards, 6:53

Fourth Quarter

- (14L08) MINN TD: Daniel Jackson 4-yard pass from Tanner Morgan (Matthew Trickett kick)
  MINN 31–0; 6 plays, 28 yards, 3:44
- (01:48) MINN FG: Matthew Trickett 22-yard field goal
  MINN 34–0; 15 plays, 76 yards, 10:37
- (00:17) MSU TD: Germie Bernard 27-yard pass from Noah Kim (Jack Stone kick)
  MINN 34–7; 8 plays 75 yards, 1:31

Passing

- MINN – Tanner Morgan: 23/26, 268 yards, 3 TD
- MSU – Payton Thorne: 17/24, 132 yards, 2 INT

Rushing

- MINN – Mohamed Ibrahim: 22 carries, 110 yards, 1 TD
- MSU – Jarek Broussard: 6 carries, 23 yards

Receiving

- MINN – Michael Brown-Stephens: 6 receptions, 73 yards
- MSU – Cade McDonald: 3 receptions, 31yards,

=== Purdue ===
	1	2	3	4	Total
Boilermakers	10	0	0	10	20
No. 21 Golden Gophers	0	3	7	0	10

=== At No. 24 Illinois ===
	1	2	3	4	Total
Golden Gophers	0	7	7	0	14
No. 24 Fighting Illini	7	6	7	6	26

=== At No. 16 Penn State ===
Minnesota at No. 16 Penn State – Game summary

Quarter	1	2	3	4	Total
Golden Gophers	3	7	0	7	17
No. 16 Nittany Lions	0	17	21	7	45

at Beaver Stadium, University Park, Pennsylvania

- Date: October 22
- Game time: 6:30 p.m. CDT
- Game weather: 58 °F (14 °C), partly cloudy
- Game attendance: 109,813
- Referee: Larry Smith
- TV announcers (ESPNews/ABC): Joe Tessitore (play-by-play), Greg McElroy (analyst), and Katie George (sideline)
- ESPN box score, GoPSUsports.com box score

Game information

First quarter

- UM – Matthew Trickett, 35-yard field goal, 1:57 (3–0, UM)

Second quarter

- PSU – Jake Pinegar, 42-yard field goal, 13:55 (3–3, TIE)
- PSU – Tyler Warren, 38-yard TD pass from Sean Clifford, Pinegar kick, 9:05 (10–3, PSU)
- PSU – Theo Johnson, 18-yard TD pass from Clifford, Pinegar kick, 4:01 (17–3, PSU)
- UM – Mohamed Ibrahim, 3-yard TD run, Trickett kick, 0:32 (17–10, PSU)

Third quarter

- PSU – Parker Washington, 35-yard TD pass from Clifford, Pinegar kick, 11:59 (24–10, PSU)
- PSU – Nicholas Singleton, 16-yard TD run, Pinegar kick, 6:33 (31–10, PSU)
- PSU – Mitchell Tinsley, 20-yard TD pass from Clifford, Pinegar kick, 0:27 (38–10, PSU)

Fourth quarter

- UM – Brevyn Spann-Ford, 2-yard TD pass from Athan Kaliakmanis, Trickett kick, 8:03 (38–17, PSU)
- PSU – Singleton, 30-yard TD run, Pinegar kick, 6:35 (45–17, PSU)

Statistics	UM	PSU
First downs	16	24
Plays–yards	68–340	67–479
Rushes–yards	46–165	34–175
Passing yards	175	304
Passing: comp–att–int	9–22–1	24–33–1
Time of possession	31:30	28:30

Team	Category	Player	Statistics
Minnesota	Passing	Athan Kaliakmanis	9/22, 175 yards, TD, INT
Minnesota	Rushing	Mohamed Ibrahim	30 carries, 102 yards, TD
Minnesota	Receiving	Brevyn Spann-Ford	5 receptions, 68 yards, TD
Penn State	Passing	Sean Clifford	23/31, 295 yards, 4 TD, INT
Penn State	Rushing	Nicholas Singleton	13 carries, 79 yards, 2 TD
Penn State	Receiving	Theo Johnson	5 receptions, 75 yards, TD

=== Rutgers ===
	1	2	3	4	Total
Scarlet Knights	0	0	0	0	0
Golden Gophers	0	14	0	17	31

=== At Nebraska ===
Minnesota Golden Gophers (5–3) vs Nebraska Cornhuskers (3–5) – Game summary

Quarter	1	2	3	4	Total
Golden Gophers	0	0	10	10	20
Cornhuskers	10	0	0	3	13

at Memorial Stadium • Lincoln, NE

- Date: November 5, 2022
- Game time: 11:00 a.m.
- Game weather: Sunny, 40 °F (4 °C)
- Game attendance: 86,284
- Referee: Mark Kluczynski
- TV announcers (ESPN2): Anish Shroff (play-by-play), Brock Osweiler (analyst), and Taylor McGregor (sideline)
- Sources: gophersports.com

Game information

First quarter

- (10:46) NEB – Chubba Purdy 2-yard run, Timmy Bleekrode kick (Drive: 9 plays, 75 yards, 4:14; Nebraska 7–0)
- (4:18) NEB – Timmy Bleekrode 24-yard field goal (Drive: 11 plays, 50 yards, 4:31; Nebraska 10–0)

Second quarter

None

Third quarter

- (10:30) MINN – Matthew Trickett 47-yard field goal (Drive: 10 plays, 46 yards, 4:30; Nebraska 10–3)
- (3:20) MINN – Mohamed Ibrahim 3-yard run, Matthew Trickett kick (Drive: 6 plays, 86 yards, 3:01; Tied 10–10)

Fourth quarter

- (14:02) MINN – Matthew Trickett 49-yard field goal (Drive: 9 plays, 47 yards, 3:22; Minnesota 13–10)
- (9:22) MINN – Mohamed Ibrahim 3-yard run, Matthew Trickett kick (Drive: 7 plays, 33 yards, 3:48; Minnesota 20–10)
- (4:49) NEB – Timmy Bleekrode 26-yard field goal (Drive: 12 plays, 67 yards, 4:33; Minnesota 20–13)

Statistics	MINN	NEB
First downs	18	13
Total yards	300	267
Rushes/yards	45–125	35–146
Passing yards	175	121
Passing: Comp–Att–Int	12–20–0	11–26–1
Time of possession	34:41	25:19

Team	Category	Player	Statistics
Minnesota	Passing	Athan Kaliakmanis	6/12, 137 yards
Minnesota	Rushing	Mohamed Ibrahim	32 carries, 128 yards, 2 TD
Minnesota	Receiving	Daniel Jackson	5 receptions, 88 yards
Nebraska	Passing	Logan Smothers	5/10, 80 yards
Nebraska	Rushing	Anthony Grant	21 carries, 115 yards
Nebraska	Receiving	Marcus Washington	2 receptions, 63 yards

=== Northwestern ===
	1	2	3	4	Total
Wildcats	0	3	0	0	3
Golden Gophers	7	7	3	14	31

=== Iowa ===
	1	2	3	4	Total
Hawkeyes	10	0	0	3	13
Golden Gophers	0	7	3	0	10

Statistics	IOWA	MINN
First downs	13	17
Total yards	280	399
Rushing yards	59	312
Passing yards	221	87
Turnovers	0	2
Time of possession	24:47	35:13

Team	Category	Player	Statistics
Iowa	Passing	Spencer Petras	15–24, 221 yards
Iowa	Rushing	Kaleb Johnson	8 carries, 43 yards
Iowa	Receiving	Sam LaPorta	4 receptions, 95 yards
Minnesota	Passing	Athan Kaliakmanis	7–15, 87 yards, INT
Minnesota	Rushing	Mohamed Ibrahim	39 carries, 263 yards, TD
Minnesota	Receiving	Daniel Jackson	2 receptions, 43 yards

=== At Wisconsin ===
Minnesota vs. Wisconsin – Game summary

Quarter	1	2	3	4	Total
Golden Gophers	7	3	3	10	23
Badgers	3	3	10	0	16

at Camp Randall Stadium, Madison, Wisconsin

- Date: November 26, 2022
- Game time: 2:34 p.m.
- Game weather: 51 °F (11 °C) • Wind: SW at 15 miles per hour (24 km/h) • Weather: Sunny
- Game attendance: 75,728
- Referee: Michael Cannon
- TV announcers (ESPN): Brian Custer (play-by-play), Dustin Fox (analyst), and Lauren Sisler (sideline)

Game information

First quarter

- WIS – Nate Van Zelst 40-yard field goal, 9:39 Wisconsin 3-0, Drive: 11 plays, 53 yards, 5:21
- MIN - Daniel Jackson 6-yard pass from Athan Kaliakmanis (Matthew Trickett Kick), 3:45 Minnesota 7-3, Drive: 10 plays, 81 yards, 5:49

Second quarter

- WIS – Nate Van Zelst 43-yard field goal, 8:51 Minnesota 7-6, Drive: 12 plays, 65 yards, 6:04
- MIN – Matthew Trickett 25-yard field goal, 0:00 Minnesota 10-6, Drive: 13 plays, 75 yards, 4:40

Third quarter

- MIN – Matthew Trickett 50-yard field goal, 10:59 Minnesota 13-6, Drive: 8 plays, 49 yards, 3:56
- WIS – Nate Van Zelst 36-yard field goal, 7:58 Minnesota 13-10, Drive: 9 plays, 57 yards, 3:01
- WIS – Chimere Dike 9-yard run (Nate Van Zelst kick), 3:14 Wisconsin 16-13, Drive: 6 plays, 54 yards, 3:07

Fourth quarter

- MIN – Matthew Trickett 27-yard field goal, 7:58 Tie 16-16, Drive: 9 plays, 69 yards, 3:03
- MIN - Le'Meke Brockington 45-yard pass from Athan Kaliakmanis (Matthew Trickett Kick), 3:40 Minnesota 23-16, Drive: 6 plays, 71 yards, 2:41

Top passers

- MIN – Athan Kaliakmanis – 19/29, 319 yards, 2 TD
- WIS – Graham Mertz – 16/27, 170 yards, INT

Top rushers

- MIN – Mohamed Ibrahim – 27 carries, 70 yards
- WIS – Chez Mellusi – 19 carries, 75 yards

Top receivers

- MIN – Brevyn Spann-Ford – 7 receptions, 95 yards
- WIS – Chimere Dike – 5 receptions, 52 yards

Top defenders

- MIN – Justin Walley – 4 tackles, INT
- WIS – Maema Njongmeta – 12 tackles, 2.5 TFL, 0.5 sack, QB hurry

=== Vs. Syracuse (Pinstripe Bowl) ===
	1	2	3	4	Total
Orange	0	7	6	7	20
Golden Gophers	0	14	14	0	28

== Rankings ==
Ranking movements Legend: ██ Increase in ranking ██ Decrease in ranking — = Not ranked RV = Received votes
	Week															
Poll	Pre	1	2	3	4	5	6	7	8	9	10	11	12	13	14	Final
AP	RV	RV	RV	RV	21	RV	RV	RV	—	RV	—	RV	—	RV	RV	RV
Coaches	RV	RV	RV	RV	23	RV	RV	—	—	—	RV	RV	—	RV	RV	RV
CFP	Not released									—	—	—	—	—	—	Not released
