= Brevyn Spann-Ford =

American football player (born 1999)

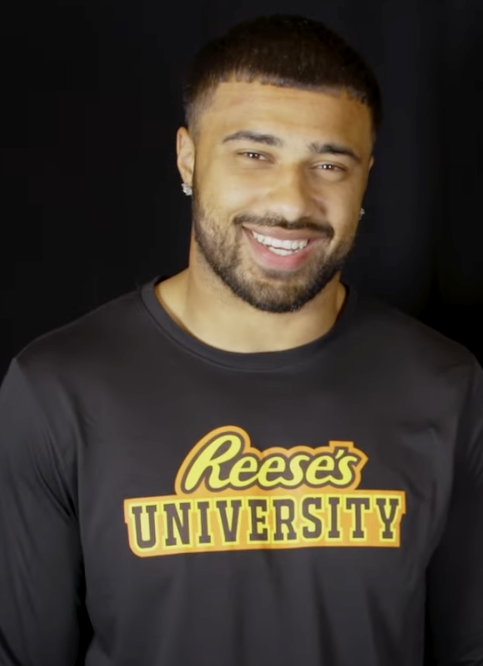
- Spann-Ford in 2024

No. 89 – Dallas Cowboys
- Position: Tight end
- Roster status: Active

Personal information
- Born: December 27, 1999 (age 26); St. Cloud, Minnesota, U.S.
- Listed height: 6 ft 6 in (1.98 m)
- Listed weight: 265 lb (120 kg)

Career information
- High school: St. Cloud Tech
- College: Minnesota (2018–2023)
- NFL draft: 2024: undrafted

Career history
- Dallas Cowboys (2024–present)

Career NFL statistics as of Week 3, 2026
- Receptions: 21
- Receiving yards: 211
- Receiving touchdowns: 1
- Stats at Pro Football Reference

Brevyn Spann-Ford (born December 27, 1999) is an American professional football tight end for the Dallas Cowboys of the National Football League (NFL). He played college football for the Minnesota Golden Gophers and was signed by the Cowboys as an undrafted free agent after the 2024 NFL draft.

== Early life ==
Spann-Ford grew up in St. Cloud, Minnesota and attended Technical Senior High School. He played football as well as basketball and averaged 13.7 points per game, 8.2 rebounds per game, and 3.8 assists per game. Spann-Ford committed to play college football at the University of Minnesota over other schools such as Missouri, Iowa State, West Virginia, and North Dakota State.

College recruiting (2018)
Name	Hometown	School	Height	Weight	Commit date
Brevyn Spann-Ford; TE	St. Cloud	Technical Senior High School	6 ft 7 in (2.01 m)	270 lb (120 kg)	Jun 2, 2017
Brevyn Spann-Ford; TE	Recruit ratings: Rivals: 247Sports: ESPN: (75)				

== College career ==
In Spann-Ford's first season in 2018, he redshirted and only played in four games not recording any statistics. In 2019 in a game against Illinois, Spann-Ford recorded his first catch, a 12-yard touchdown reception, as he helped the Golden Gophers beat Illinois 24–17. Spann-Ford finished the 2019 season with four receptions for 25 yards and a touchdown. In the 2020 season, Spann-Ford caught a four-yard touchdown pass to help Minnesota beat Nebraska 24–17. Spann-Ford finished the 2020 season playing in only one game, catching one pass for four yards and a touchdown. Spann-Ford began the 2021 season strong, hauling in three receptions for 44 yards, but the Golden Gophers lost to #4 Ohio State 45–31. In week seven, Spann-Ford brought in three passes for 23 yards and a touchdown to help Minnesota survive Nebraska 30–23. He caught four receptions for 49 yards in week 10 as Minnesota lost 14–6 to Illinois. In week twelve, Spann-Ford made three receptions for 67 yards, as he helped the Golden Gophers dominate Indiana 35–14. Spann-Ford closed the season strong, as in week thirteen he brought in three receptions for 62 yards, helping Minnesota beat rival #18 Wisconsin 23–13. Spann-Ford would finish his 2021 season with 23 receptions for 296 yards and a touchdown, in ten games. Spann-Ford started the 2022 season off to a strong start, as in week two, he caught three passes for 64 yards and a touchdown, as he helped Minnesota beat Western Illinois. Later in week five, Spann-Ford brought in three receptions for 53 yards, but the Golden Gophers fell to Purdue 20–10. In week eight, Spann-Ford hauled in five receptions for 68 yards and the first career touchdown pass from quarterback Athan Kaliakmanis, but Minnesota was dismantled by Penn State 45–17. In the team's season finale, Spann-Ford had one of the best performances of his career, catching seven passes for 95 yards, helping Minnesota beat rival Wisconsin 23–16. Spann-Ford finished the season with 47 receptions for 497 yards and two touchdowns. For his performance on the season, Spann-Ford was named an honorable all Big-Ten mention. After the conclusion of the 2022 season, Spann-Ford announced that he would return to Minnesota for the 2023 season. Spann-Ford was named to the first team all Big-Ten preseason team. Spann-Ford was also named a preseason second-team All-American by the Walter Camp Football Foundation.

=== College statistics ===
Year	Team	Games		Receiving			
Year	Team	GP	GS	Rec	Yards	Avg	TD
2018	Minnesota	4	0	0	0	0.0	0
2019	Minnesota	12	0	4	25	6.3	1
2020	Minnesota	6	0	1	4	4.0	1
2021	Minnesota	13	3	23	296	12.9	1
2022	Minnesota	13	13	42	497	11.8	2
2023	Minnesota	12	12	25	239	9.6	2
Career		60	28	95	1061	11.2	7

== Professional career ==
Pre-draft measurables
Height	Weight	Arm length	Hand span	Wingspan	40-yard dash	10-yard split	20-yard split	20-yard shuttle	Three-cone drill	Vertical jump	Broad jump	Bench press
6 ft 6 1/2 in (1.99 m)	260 lb (118 kg)	33 3/8 in (0.85 m)	10 1/4 in (0.26 m)	6 ft 8 in (2.03 m)	4.77 s	1.67 s	2.77 s	4.51 s	7.38 s	31.5 in (0.80 m)	9 ft 8 in (2.95 m)	18 reps
All values from NFL Combine/Pro Day

Spann-Ford signed as an undrafted free agent with the Dallas Cowboys following the 2024 NFL draft. As a UDFA, Spann-Ford notably made the Cowboys' 53 man roster out of training camp. Spann-Ford caught his first ever touchdown in the NFL against the Philadelphia Eagles in a 24-21 comeback win on November 24, 2025.

On September 10, 2026, Spann-Ford signed a three-year, $18 million contract extension with the Cowboys that runs through the 2029 season.

== NFL career statistics ==
Legend
**Bold**	Career high

=== Regular season ===
Year	Team	Games		Receiving					Tackles			Fumbles	
Year	Team	GP	GS	Rec	Yds	Avg	Lng	TD	Cmb	Solo	Ast	Fum	Lost
2024	DAL	17	0	**9**	88	9.8	18	0	3	2	1	0	0
2025	DAL	17	5	**9**	**90**	**10.0**	**31**	**1**	**20**	**9**	**11**	0	0
2026	DAL	2	0	2	14	7.0	8	0	0	0	0	0	0
Career		34	5	18	178	9.9	31	1	23	11	12	0	0
