= LeQuint Allen =

American football player (born 2004)

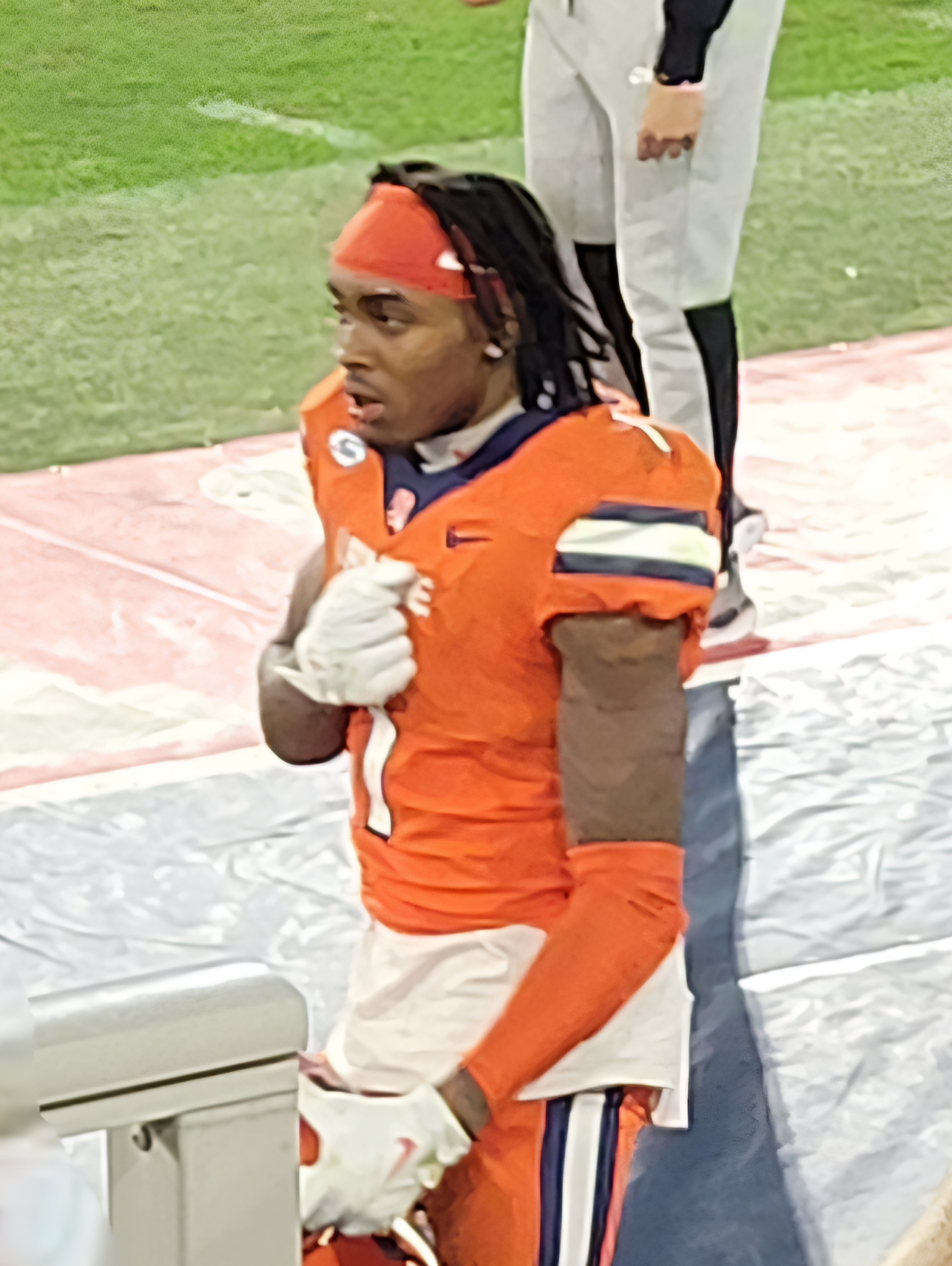
- Allen with the Syracuse Orange in 2023

No. 5 – Jacksonville Jaguars
- Positions: Running back, kickoff returner
- Roster status: Active

Personal information
- Born: August 5, 2004 (age 22); Millville, New Jersey, U.S.
- Listed height: 6 ft 0 in (1.83 m)
- Listed weight: 201 lb (91 kg)

Career information
- High school: Millville
- College: Syracuse (2022–2024)
- NFL draft: 2025: 7th round, 236th overall pick

Career history
- Jacksonville Jaguars (2025–present)

Awards and highlights
- Second-team All-ACC (2023)

Career NFL statistics as of 2025
- Rushing yards: 94
- Rushing average: 4.1
- Receptions: 10
- Receiving yards: 54
- Return yards: 617
- Stats at Pro Football Reference

LeQuint Allen Jr. (born August 5, 2004) is an American professional football running back and kickoff returner for the Jacksonville Jaguars of the National Football League (NFL). He played college football for the Syracuse Orange and was selected by the Jaguars in the seventh round of the 2025 NFL draft.

== Early life ==
Allen attended Millville Senior High School in Millville, New Jersey. As a junior, he rushed for 670 yards and ten touchdowns while making 33 receptions for 284 yards. On defense, Allen had 84 tackles, six sacks, and three interceptions. In week 4 of his senior season, he totaled six touchdowns. In 2022, Allen was named New Jersey’s Gatorade Player of the Year.

Coming out of high school, Allen was rated as a three-star recruit and committed to play college football for the Syracuse Orange.

== College career ==
Allen got his first career start in the 2022 Pinstripe Bowl where he rushed for 94 yards and hauled in 11 receptions for 60 yards. He finished his freshman season rushing for 274 yards and a touchdown on 41 carries and hauling in 17 receptions for 117 yards and a touchdown.

On December 9, 2022, Allen got into a fight on the school's campus after coming to the aid of teammate Duce Chestnut; after the fight, Allen was charged with third-degree assault. As a result of the fight and charges, Allen was suspended by Syracuse for the entirety of the 2023 season. On June 26, 2023, Allen filed a lawsuit against the university to have his suspension overturned and his record expunged. A few weeks later, on July 12, Allen and the university reached an agreement that allowed Allen to rejoin the football team, effective August 15, and to return to classes for the upcoming fall semester.

During the 2023 season, Allen rushed for 1,064 yards and nine touchdowns on 245 carries and notched 38 receptions for 210 yards and a touchdown, earning second-team all-ACC honors. In the 2023 season opener, he rushed for 107 yards and a touchdown in a win over Wofford.

In 2024 season, Allen was the starting RB and rushed for 901 rushing yards in regular season and led the ACC for total of 17 touchdowns. He was the nation's leading pass catcher among running backs, receiving 476 yards on 61 passes from quarterback Kyle McCord. Allen was an honorable mention on the all-ACC team at both running back and the all-purpose position. He was named ACC player of the week after Syracuse's 44–41 road win over No. 25 UNLV. Allen scored four touchdowns, gained 129 all-purpose yards, and won the game on the final play in the overtime by bulldozing his way into the end zone through star UNLV linebacker Jackson Woodard.

On January 2, 2025, Allen announced that he would be entering the draft.

== Professional career ==
Pre-draft measurables
Height	Weight	Arm length	Hand span	Wingspan	Vertical jump	Broad jump
6 ft 0 1/8 in (1.83 m)	204 lb (93 kg)	32 in (0.81 m)	10 1/8 in (0.26 m)	6 ft 6 5/8 in (2.00 m)	35.0 in (0.89 m)	10 ft 0 in (3.05 m)
All values from NFL Combine

Allen was selected by the Jacksonville Jaguars with the 236th overall pick in the seventh round of the 2025 NFL draft.

== NFL career statistics ==
=== Regular season ===
Year	Team	Games		Rushing					Receiving					Kick returns					Fumbles			
Year	Team	GP	GS	Att	Yds	Avg	Lng	TD	Rec	Yds	Avg	Lng	TD	Ret	Yds	Avg	Lng	TD	FF	FR	Fmb	Lost
2025	JAX	17	1	23	94	4.1	12	0	10	54	5.4	10	0	24	617	25.7	50	0	1	2	0	0
Career		17	1	23	94	4.1	12	0	10	54	5.4	10	0	24	617	25.7	50	0	1	2	0	0

=== Postseason ===
Year	Team	Games		Rushing					Receiving					Kick returns					Fumbles			
Year	Team	GP	GS	Att	Yds	Avg	Lng	TD	Rec	Yds	Avg	Lng	TD	Ret	Yds	Avg	Lng	TD	FF	FR	Fmb	Lost
2025	JAX	1	0	1	3	3.0	3	0	1	9	9.0	9	0	1	26	26.0	26	0	1	0	0	0
Career		1	0	1	3	3.0	3	0	1	9	9.0	9	0	1	26	26.0	26	0	1	0	0	0

== Personal life ==
On February 14, 2023, Allen's father LeQuint Allen Sr. was killed via gunshot as he was walking away from an argument.
