= Athan Kaliakmanis =

American football player (born 2003)

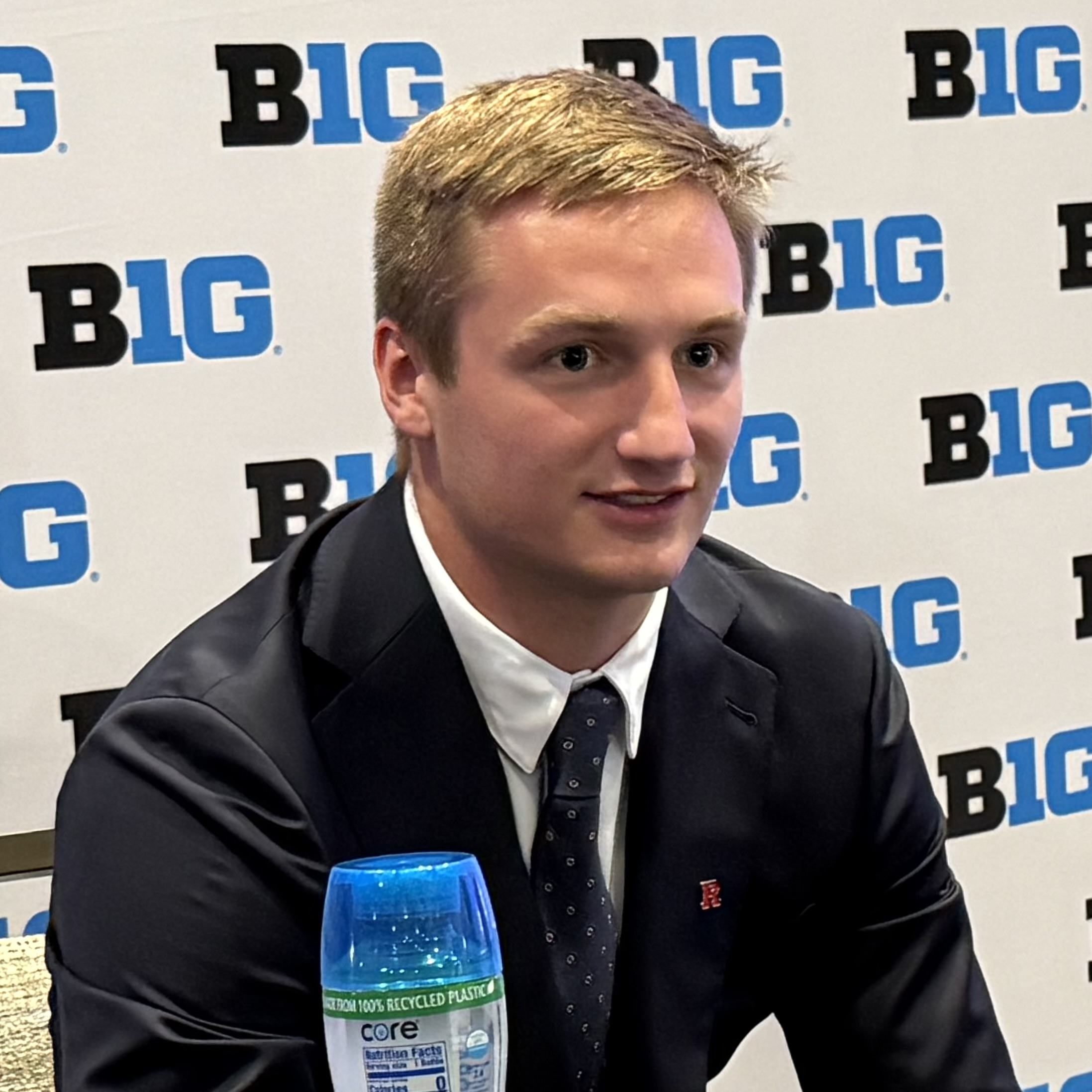
- Kaliakmanis in 2025

No. 16 – Washington Commanders
- Position: Quarterback
- Roster status: Active

Personal information
- Born: August 20, 2003 (age 23)
- Listed height: 6 ft 2 in (1.88 m)
- Listed weight: 216 lb (98 kg)

Career information
- High school: Antioch Community (Antioch, Illinois)
- College: Minnesota (2021–2023); Rutgers (2024–2025)
- NFL draft: 2026: 7th round, 223rd overall pick

Career history
- Washington Commanders (2026–present)

Career NFL statistics as of Week 4, 2026
- Passing attempts: 33
- Passing completions: 15
- Completion percentage: 45.5%
- TD–INT: 1–1
- Passing yards: 186
- Passer rating: 60.9
- Stats at Pro Football Reference

Athan Kaliakmanis (/ˈeɪθən ˌkæliəkˈmænɪs/ AY-thən KAL-ee-ək-MAN-iss; born August 20, 2003) is an American professional football quarterback for the Washington Commanders of the National Football League (NFL). Kaliakmanis played college football for the Minnesota Golden Gophers and Rutgers Scarlet Knights and was selected by the Commanders in the seventh round of the 2026 NFL draft.

== Early life ==
Kaliakmanis was born on August 20, 2003, and grew up in Antioch, Illinois, later attending Antioch Community High School. In 2021, he was named the Illinois Gatorade Player of the Year after completing 77 of 132 passes for 1,158 yards and 15 touchdowns to just one interception. He also rushed 40 times for 245 yards and four touchdowns. Kaliakmanis committed to play college football for the Golden Gophers at the University of Minnesota.

== College career ==
=== Minnesota ===
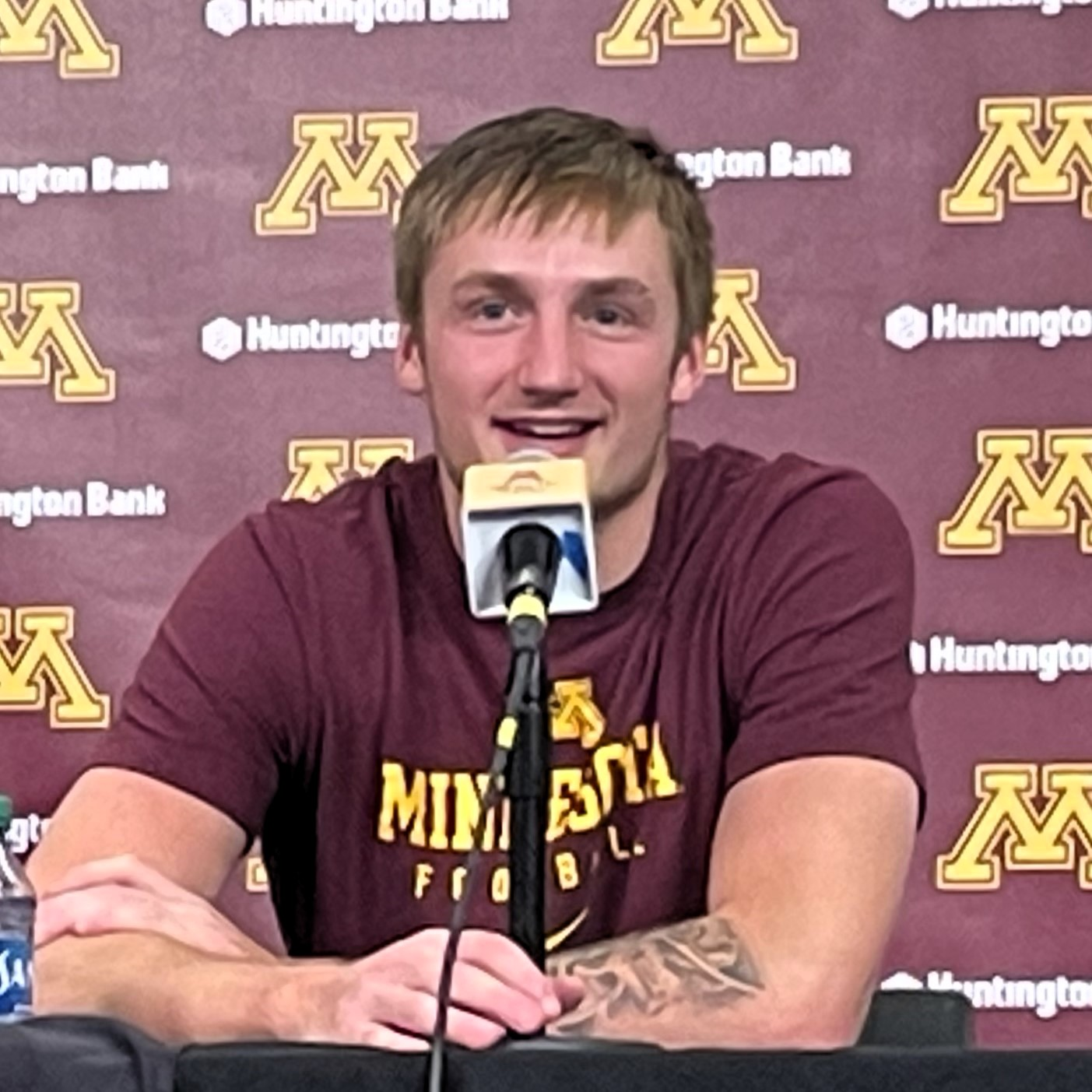
Kaliakmanis with the Minnesota Golden Gophers in 2023

Kaliakmanis redshirted as a freshman at Minnesota. As a sophomore, he made his debut against New Mexico State and had his first touchdown against Western Illinois. In the seventh game of the season, Kaliakmanis got his first career start at Penn State after starting quarterback Tanner Morgan went down with a concussion. In his first start he completed 9 of 22 passes for 175 yards, a touchdown, and an interception in a 45–17 loss. Kaliakmanis got his next chance in a Week 9 matchup against Nebraska after Morgan again went down with an injury in the third quarter. Kaliakmanis went 6-for-12 for 137 yards in a 20–13 win after being down 10–0 at halftime. The next week Kaliakmanis earned his first win as a starter after going 7-for-13 for 64 yards in a 31–3 win over Northwestern. Kaliakmanis got his third start against Iowa, going 7-for-15 for 87 yards and an interception in a 13–10 last-second loss. Kaliakmanis started the season finale against Wisconsin and completed 19 of 29 passes for 319 yards and two touchdowns, including the game-winning touchdown to La'Meke Brockington, as the Golden Gophers won 23–16, and was named the Big Ten Conference co-freshman of the week. Kaliakmanis started in the 2022 Pinstripe Bowl against Syracuse and completed seven of nine passes for 80 yards and a touchdown before exiting the game with a lower leg injury.

Kaliakmanis became the Golden Gophers starting quarterback in 2023.

On November 28, 2023, Kaliakmanis announced that he would be entering the NCAA transfer portal.

=== Rutgers ===
On January 2, 2024, Kaliakmanis announced that he would be transferring to Rutgers University to play for the Scarlet Knights. He joined his brother, Dino, a wide receiver who had also transferred from Minnesota to Rutgers.

== Career Statistics ==
=== NFL ===
Year	Team	Games			Passing									Rushing					Sacks		Fumbles	
Year	Team	GP	GS	Record	Cmp	Att	Pct	Yds	Y/A	Lng	TD	Int	Rtg	Att	Yds	Y/A	Lng	TD	Sck	SckY	Fum	Lost
2026	WAS	1	0	–	15	33	45.5	186	5.6	48	1	1	60.9	3	16	5.3	9	0	1	9	0	0
Career		1	0	–	15	33	45.5	186	5.6	48	1	1	60.9	3	16	5.3	9	0	1	9	0	0

=== College ===
College statistics
Season	Team	Games			Passing								Rushing			
Season	Team	GP	GS	Record	Cmp	Att	Pct	Yds	Y/A	TD	Int	Rtg	Att	Yds	Avg	TD
2021	Minnesota	0	0	—	Redshirted (redshirt)											
2022	Minnesota	11	5	3−2	60	111	54.1	946	8.5	3	4	127.4	34	140	4.1	1
2023	Minnesota	12	12	5–7	156	294	53.1	1,838	6.3	14	9	115.2	74	94	1.3	2
2024	Rutgers	13	13	7–6	213	395	53.9	2,696	6.8	18	7	122.8	92	251	2.7	3
2025	Rutgers	12	12	5–7	229	368	62.2	3,124	8.5	20	7	147.7	58	3	0.1	2
Career		48	42	20−22	658	1,168	55.8	8,604	7.5	55	27	128.3	258	488	1.9	8

== Professional career ==
Pre-draft measurables
Height	Weight	Arm length	Hand span	Wingspan	40-yard dash	10-yard split	20-yard split	20-yard shuttle	Three-cone drill	Vertical jump	Broad jump
6 ft 2 1/2 in (1.89 m)	216 lb (98 kg)	32 7/8 in (0.84 m)	9 1/8 in (0.23 m)	6 ft 7 1/8 in (2.01 m)	4.92 s	1.74 s	2.84 s	4.33 s	6.96 s	29.5 in (0.75 m)	9 ft 6 in (2.90 m)
All values from Pro Day

Kaliakmanis was selected by the Washington Commanders in the seventh round with the 223rd overall pick of the 2026 NFL draft, signing his four-year rookie contract on May 8, 2026.

Kaliakmanis made his professional debut on August 14, 2026 during the first preseason game against the Miami Dolphins, where he completed 6 out of 10 passes for 87 yards.

On October 4, 2026, with quarterbacks Jayden Daniels and Marcus Mariota both ruled out with injury, Kaliakmanis received his first regular season NFL snaps in a 13–30 loss against the Indianapolis Colts. He threw his first NFL touchdown in the third quarter, a 47 yard pass to Treylon Burks. Kaliakmanis ended the game completing 15 of his 33 attempted passes, throwing for 186 yards, a touchdown and an interception.

== Personal life ==
Kaliakmanis is Greek American and was named after Athanasius of Alexandria.
