= 2022 NC State Wolfpack football team =

American college football season

2022 NC State Wolfpack football

Duke's Mayo Bowl, L 12–16 vs. Maryland
- Conference: Atlantic Coast Conference
- Atlantic Division
- Record: 8–5 (4–4 ACC)
- Head coach: Dave Doeren (10th season)
- Offensive coordinator: Tim Beck (3rd season)
- Offensive scheme: Spread option
- Defensive coordinator: Tony Gibson (4th season)
- Base defense: 3–3–5
- Home stadium: Carter–Finley Stadium

2022 Atlantic Coast Conference football standings
	Conf.			Overall
Team	W		L	W		L
Atlantic Division
No. 13 Clemson xy$	8	–	0	11	–	3
No. 11 Florida State	5	–	3	10	–	3
Louisville	4	–	4	8	–	5
NC State	4	–	4	8	–	5
Syracuse	4	–	4	7	–	6
Wake Forest	3	–	5	8	–	5
Boston College	2	–	6	3	–	9
Coastal Division
North Carolina xy	6	–	2	9	–	5
Duke	5	–	3	9	–	4
No. 22 Pittsburgh	5	–	3	9	–	4
Georgia Tech	4	–	4	5	–	7
Miami (FL)	3	–	5	5	–	7
Virginia	1	–	6	3	–	7
Virginia Tech	1	–	6	3	–	8
Championship: Clemson 39, North Carolina 10
$ – Conference champion; x – Division champion/co-champions; y – Championship game participant; Rankings from AP Poll

The 2022 NC State Wolfpack football team represented North Carolina State University during the 2022 NCAA Division I FBS football season. The Wolfpack played their home games at Carter–Finley Stadium in Raleigh, North Carolina, and competed as members of the Atlantic Coast Conference. They were led by head coach Dave Doeren, in his 10th season.

== Coaching staff ==
Name	Title
Dave Doeren	Head Coach
Tim Beck	Offensive coordinator/quarterbacks
Tony Gibson	Defensive coordinator/linebackers
Charlie Wiles	Defensive Line
Joe DeForest	Safeties
Todd Goebbel	Tight Ends/special teams
Freddie Aughtry-Lindsay	Nickels
John Garrison	Offensive Line
Brian Mitchell	Cornerbacks
Kurt Roper	Running Backs
Joker Phillips	Receivers
Ruffin McNeill	Special Assistant to the head coach

== Roster ==
2022 NC State Wolfpack football team roster
Quarterbacks: 10 Ben Finley – freshman (6'1, 225) (redshirt); 12 Zo Wallace – freshman (6'1, 254) (redshirt); 13 Devin Leary – junior (6'1, 215) (redshirt); 14 Jack Chambers – graduate (5'10, 180); 16 MJ Morris – freshman (6'2, 192); 19 Ethan Rhodes – freshman (6'3, 198); Running backs: 0 Demie Sumo-Karngbaye – sophomore (6'0, 210); 3 Jordan Houston – junior (5'10, 192); 22 Micah Crowell – freshman (6'1, 215) (redshirt); 24 Michael Allen – freshman (5'9, 200); 28 Demarcus Jones II – sophomore (5'10, 210) (redshirt); 34 Delbert Mimms III – sophomore (5'11, 215) (redshirt); 36 Devin Gardner – freshman (5'10, 240); Wide receivers: 4 Porter Rooks – sophomore (6'1, 195); 5 Thayer Thomas – graduate (6'0, 195); 7 Julian Gray – freshman (5'11, 197) (redshirt); 11 Darryl Jones – graduate (6'3, 195); 15 Keyon Lesane – junior (5'11, 190); 21 Jalen Coit – freshman (5'11, 171) (redshirt); 27 Ashton Locklear – freshman (6'1, 170); 29 Christopher Toudle – sophomore (6'4, 240) (redshirt); 31 Dillon Mosley – freshman (6'0, 195) (redshirt); 33 Jackson DeSilva – sophomore (6'1, 200) (redshirt); 35 Michael Fox – sophomore (6'0, 174) (redshirt); 82 Terrell Timmons Jr. – freshman (6'2, 180); 83 Josh Crabtree – freshman (6'3, 200) (redshirt); 84 Jasiah Provillon – junior (6'2, 205) (redshirt); 85 Anthony Smith – sophomore (6'2, 190); 88 Devin Carter – junior (6'3, 215) (redshirt); 89 Jakolbe Baldwin – freshman (6'0, 195) (redshirt); Tight ends: 6 Trent Pennix – junior (6'3, 230) (redshirt); 43 Ezemdi Udoh – freshman (6'5, 247) (redshirt); 44 Yates Johnson – freshman (6'5, 240) (redshirt); 47 Cedd Seabrough – freshman (6'4, 245) (redshirt); 48 Fred Seabrough Jr. – freshman (6'4, 250) (redshirt); 49 Reid Mitchell – freshman (6'4, 220) (redshirt); 87 Kameron Walker – sophomore (6'5, 250) (redshirt); Punters: 90 Shane McDonough – graduate (6'2, 200); 98 Caden Noonkester – freshman (6'6, 200) (redshirt)	Offensive lineman: 50 Grant Gibson – graduate (6'1, 310); 52 Timothy McKay – graduate (6'4, 315); 53 Derrick Eason – junior (6'4, 315) (redshirt); 54 Dylan McMahon – sophomore (6'4, 305) (redshirt); 55 Rylan Vann – freshman (6'1, 295); 56 Bryson Speas – graduate (6'3, 315); 57 Lyndon Cooper – freshman (6'2, 316) (redshirt); 60 Blair Alexander – freshman (6'2, 248); 61 Corey Ball – freshman (6'2, 265); 62 Jaleel Davis – freshman (6'6, 315) (redshirt); 64 Chandler Zavala – graduate (6'5, 325); 65 Jacarrius Peak – freshman (6'4, 266); 66 Matt McCabe – freshman (6'6, 290) (redshirt); 67 Brendan Lawson – sophomore (6'2, 290); 68 Luke Peters – freshman (6'4, 275); 71 Thornton Gentry – freshman (6'4, 310) (redshirt); 72 Sean Hill – freshman (6'3, 315) (redshirt); 74 Anthony Belton – sophomore (6'6, 330) (redshirt); 75 Anthony Carter Jr. – freshman (6'3, 300) (redshirt); 76 Patrick Matan – freshman (6'4, 310) (redshirt); Defensive lineman: 0 Joshua Harris– sophomore (6'4, 325) (redshirt); 5 C.J. Clark – sophomore (6'3, 300) (redshirt); 9 Savion Jackson – junior (6'2, 290); 44 Brandon Cleveland – freshman (6'4, 290); 45 Davin Vann – sophomore (6'2, 295); 46 Nick Campbell – freshman (6'4, 290); 48 Cory Durden – graduate (6'4, 305); 53 Derrick Eason – junior (6'4, 315) (redshirt); 56 Zyun Reeves – freshman (6'7, 265) (redshirt); 58 Travali Price – freshman (6'4, 265) (redshirt); 91 Jerome Williams – sophomore (6'1, 275) (redshirt); 94 Alec Neugent – sophomore (6'2, 250) (redshirt); 97 Claude Larkins – freshman (6'4, 282) (redshirt); 98 DJ Jackson – freshman (6'1, 290); 98 Aiden Hollingsworth – freshman (6'4, 232)	Placekickers: 32 Christopher Dunn – graduate (5'8, 179); 90 Collin Smith – sophomore (5'9, 185) (redshirt); 94 Kanoah Vinesett – freshman (6'0, 186); 96 Brooks Sturgeon – freshman (6'2, 187); Linebackers: 1 Isaiah Moore – junior (6'2, 236) (redshirt); 2 Jaylon Scott – sophomore (6'1, 245); 11 Payton Wilson – junior (6'4, 235) (redshirt); 26 Devon Betty – sophomore (6'1, 225); 27 Jayland Parker – freshman (6'1, 215) (redshirt); 28 Aristotle Bowles – junior (5'11, 222) (redshirt); 31 Daejuan Thompson – freshman (6'2, 183); 32 Drake Thomas – junior (6'0, 230); 33 Jordan Poole – freshman (6'0, 222) (redshirt); 35 Jason Scott – freshman (6'3, 220); 36 Patrick Turner – freshman (6'2, 230); 39 Jamie Shaw – sophomore (6'4, 230) (redshirt); 41 Caden Fordham – freshman (6'1, 225) (redshirt); 42 Torren Wright – freshman (6'2, 205); 43 Colby Johnson – freshman (6'0, 210) (redshirt); Defensive backs: 3 Aydan White – freshman (6'0, 178); 4 Cyrus Fagan – graduate (6'1, 197); 4 Cecil Powell – sophomore (6'0, 190) (redshirt); 6 Chris Ingram – junior (5'10, 190); 8 Jalen Frazier – freshman (5'9, 180) (redshirt); 10 Tanner Ingle – senior (5'10, 186); 12 Devan Boykin – sophomore (5'10, 187); 13 Tyler Baker-Williams – senior (6'0, 205); 14 Dreshun Miller – graduate (6'2, 186); 16 Rakeim Ashford – junior (6'1, 190); 19 Joshua Pierre-Louis – sophomore (5'10, 175); 20 Sean Brown – freshman (6'0, 198); 22 Teshaun Smith – junior (6'3, 190) (redshirt); 24 Derrek Pitts Jr. – graduate (6'1, 190); 25 Shyheim Battle – sophomore (6'2, 195) (redshirt); 26 Jackson Vick – freshman (5'11, 172); 29 Jaxon King – freshman (6'2, 185); 30 Isaiah Crowell – freshman (5'10, 175); 30 Darius Edmundson – junior (6'0, 175) (redshirt); 34 Walt Gerard – freshman (6'0, 197); 35 Chase Hattley – freshman (6'3, 215) (redshirt); 35 Christopher Scott Jr. – freshman (6'0, 170) (redshirt); 37 Nicholas Treco – sophomore (5'11, 185) (redshirt); 38 Clay Craddock – freshman (6'0, 210) (redshirt); Long snappers: 91 Joe Shimko – junior (6'0, 220); 92 Alex McLaughlin – freshman (5'10, 230) (redshirt)

== Schedule ==
NC State announced its 2022 football schedule on January 31, 2022. The 2022 schedule consists of seven home games and five away games in the regular season. The Wolfpack will host ACC foes Boston College, Florida State, Virginia Tech, and Wake Forest and will travel to Clemson, Louisville, North Carolina, and Syracuse.

The Wolfpack will host three of the four non-conference opponents, Charleston Southern from Division I FCS, Texas Tech from the Big 12 and UConn from FBS Independents, and will travel to East Carolina from the American Athletic Conference.

Date	Time	Opponent	Rank	Site	TV	Result	Attendance	Source
September 3	12:00 p.m.	at East Carolina*	No. 13	Dowdy–Ficklen Stadium; Greenville, NC (rivalry)	ESPN	W 21–20	51,711	
September 10	12:30 p.m.	Charleston Southern*	No. 18	Carter–Finley Stadium; Raleigh, NC	ACCRSN	W 55–3	54,169	
September 17	7:00 p.m.	Texas Tech*	No. 16	Carter–Finley Stadium; Raleigh, NC	ESPN2	W 27–14	56,919	
September 24	7:30 p.m.	UConn*	No. 12	Carter–Finley Stadium; Raleigh, NC	ACCRSN	W 41–10	56,919	
October 1	7:30 p.m.	at No. 5 Clemson	No. 10	Memorial Stadium; Clemson, SC (Textile Bowl/College GameDay)	ABC	L 20–30	81,500	
October 8	8:00 p.m.	Florida State	No. 14	Carter–Finley Stadium; Raleigh, NC	ACCN	W 19–17	56,919	
October 15	3:30 p.m	at No. 18 Syracuse	No. 15	JMA Wireless Dome; Syracuse, NY	ACCN	L 9–24	49,705	
October 27	7:30 p.m.	Virginia Tech	No. 24	Carter–Finley Stadium; Raleigh, NC	ESPN	W 22–21	56,919	
November 5	8:00 p.m.	No. 21 Wake Forest^{†}	No. 22	Carter–Finley Stadium; Raleigh, NC (rivalry)	ACCN	W 30–21	56,919	
November 12	3:30 p.m.	Boston College	No. 16	Carter–Finley Stadium; Raleigh, NC	ACCN	L 20–21	56,919	
November 19	3:30 p.m.	at Louisville	No. 24	Cardinal Stadium; Louisville, KY	ACCRSN	L 10–25	38,974	
November 25	3:30 p.m.	at No. 17 North Carolina		Kenan Stadium; Chapel Hill, NC (rivalry)	ABC	W 30–27 ^{2OT}	50,500	
December 30	12:00 p.m.	vs. Maryland*	No. 23	Bank of America Stadium; Charlotte, NC (Duke's Mayo Bowl)	ESPN	L 12–16	37,228	
*Non-conference game; ^{†}Homecoming; Rankings from AP Poll (and CFP Rankings, after November 1) - Released prior to game; All times are in Eastern time

== Game summaries ==
=== At East Carolina ===
No. 13 NC State at East Carolina

Team	1	2	3	4	Total
• No. 13 Wolfpack	14	7	0	0	21
Pirates	7	0	7	6	20

- Date: September 3, 2022
- Location: Dowdy–Ficklen Stadium
  Greenville, NC
- Game start: 12:00 p.m. EDT
- Elapsed time: 3 hours, 47 minutes
- Game attendance: 51,711
- Game weather: Temperature: 87 °F (31 °C) • Weather: Sunny
- Referee: Riley Johnson
- TV announcers (ESPN): Anish Shroff (play–by–play), Brock Osweiler (analyst), and Lauren Sisler (sideline reporter)

Scoring summary
1	10:03	ECU	C.J. Johnson 39 yard pass from Holton Ahlers (Owen Daffer kick) (7 plays, 70 yards, 3:15)	ECU 7–0
1	02:40	NCSU	Thayer Thomas 12 yard pass from Devin Leary (Christopher Dunn kick) (8 plays, 64 yards, 4:11)	Tied 7–7
1	01:34	NCSU	Sean Brown 0 yard punt return (Christopher Dunn kick)	NCSU 14–7
2	01:09	NCSU	Demie Sumo-Karngbaye 24 yard run (Christopher Dunn kick) (12 plays, 85 yards, 3:48)	NCSU 21–7
3	05:17	ECU	Shane Calhoun 1 yard pass from Holton Ahlers (Owen Daffer kick) (13 plays, 79 yards, 6:28)	NCSU 21–14
4	02:58	ECU	Rahjai Harris 3 yard run (Owen Daffer kick missed) (4 plays, 27 yards, 2:19)	NCSU 21–20

Statistics	NCSU	ECU
First downs	18	17
Total yards	344	383
Rushing yards	133	109
Passing yards	211	274
Turnovers	2	2
Time of possession	27:42	32:18

Team	Category	Player	Statistics
NC State	Passing	Devin Leary	17–33, 211 yards, 1 TD, 1 INT
NC State	Rushing	Demie Sumo-Karngbaye	14 carries, 79 yards, 1 TD
NC State	Receiving	Thayer Thomas	4 receptions, 58 yards, 1 TD
East Carolina	Passing	Holton Ahlers	25–41, 274 yards, 2 TD, 2 INT
East Carolina	Rushing	Holton Ahlers	4 carries, 48 yards
East Carolina	Receiving	C.J. Johnson	6 receptions, 90 yards, 1 TD

=== Charleston Southern ===
Charleston Southern at No. 18 NC State

Team	1	2	3	4	Total
Buccaneers	0	0	3	0	3
• No. 18 Wolfpack	10	28	10	7	55

- Date: September 10, 2022
- Location: Carter–Finley Stadium
  Raleigh, NC
- Game start: 12:30 p.m. EDT
- Elapsed time: 3 hours, 31 minutes
- Game attendance: 54,169
- Game weather: Temperature: 73 °F (23 °C) • Weather: Cloudy
- Referee: Jeff Knight
- TV announcers (ACCRSN): Tom Werme (play–by–play), James Bates (analyst), and Lyndsay Rowley (sideline reporter)

Scoring summary
1	12:41	NCSU	Christopher Dunn 46 yard field goal (6 plays, 19 yards, 2:41)	NCSU 3–0
1	03:28	NCSU	Devin Leary 12 yard run (Christopher Dunn kick) (12 plays, 95 yards, 5:22)	NCSU 10–0
2	13:17	NCSU	Devin Leary 2 yard run (Christopher Dunn kick) (9 plays, 67 yards, 4:19)	NCSU 17–0
2	11:16	NCSU	Jordan Houston 24 yard pass from Devin Leary (Christopher Dunn kick) (3 plays, 47 yards, 0:53)	NCSU 24–0
2	06:31	NCSU	Anthony Smith 40 yard pass from Devin Leary (Christopher Dunn kick) (6 plays, 65 yards, 3:03)	NCSU 31–0
2	00:58	NCSU	Delbert Mimms 20 yard pass from Devin Leary (Christopher Dunn kick) (6 plays, 50 yards, 2:05)	NCSU 38–0
3	12:48	NCSU	Christopher Toudle 27 yard pass from Devin Leary (Christopher Dunn kick) (1 plays, 27 yards, 0:08)	NCSU 45–0
3	11:07	NCSU	Christopher Dunn 45 yard field goal (5 plays, 11 yards, 0:57)	NCSU 48–0
3	07:35	CHSO	Sam Babbush 48 yard field goal (4 plays, 5 yards, 0:50)	NCSU 48–3
4	13:36	NCSU	Jalen Coit 10 yard pass from Jack Chambers (Christopher Dunn kick) (9 plays, 64 yards, 4:02)	NCSU 55–3

Statistics	CHSO	NCSU
First downs	9	32
Total yards	150	538
Rushing yards	36	217
Passing yards	114	321
Turnovers	2	0
Time of possession	24:00	36:00

Team	Category	Player	Statistics
Charleston Southern	Passing	Ross Malmgren	19–37, 11 yards, 1 INT
Charleston Southern	Rushing	Isaiah Bess	6 carries, 37 yards
Charleston Southern	Receiving	Seth Anderson	5 receptions, 40 yards
NC State	Passing	Devin Leary	16–25, 238 yards, 4 TD
NC State	Rushing	Demie Sumo-Karngbaye	7 carries, 70 yards
NC State	Receiving	Anthony Smith	2 receptions, 58 yards, 1 TD

=== Texas Tech ===
Texas Tech at No. 16 NC State

Team	1	2	3	4	Total
Red Raiders	0	7	0	7	14
• No. 16 Wolfpack	6	14	0	7	27

- Date: September 17, 2022
- Location: Carter–Finley Stadium
  Raleigh, NC
- Game start: 7:00 p.m. EDT
- Elapsed time: 3 hours, 42 minutes
- Game attendance: 56,919
- Game weather: Temperature: 75 °F (24 °C) • Weather: Sunny
- Referee: Kevin Mar
- TV announcers (ESPN2): Anish Shroff (play–by–play), Brock Osweiler (analyst), and Taylor McGregor (sideline reporter)

Scoring summary
1	07:39	NCSU	Christopher Dunn 29 yard field goal (7 plays, 1 yards, 3:35)	NCSU 3–0
1	02:29	NCSU	Christopher Dunn 47 yard field goal (6 plays, 26 yards, 3:27)	NCSU 6–0
2	10:13	NCSU	Demie Sumo-Karngbaye 14 yard run (Christopher Dunn kick) (4 plays, 43 yards, 1:41)	NCSU 13–0
2	04:40	NCSU	Aydan White 84 yard interception return (Christopher Dunn kick)	NCSU 20–0
2	00:50	TTU	Myles Price 24 yard pass from Donovan Smith (Trey Wollf kick) (4 plays, 60 yards, 1:14)	NCSU 20–7
4	14:20	NCSU	Demie Sumo-Karngbaye 38 yard pass from Thayer Thomas (Christopher Dunn kick) (1 plays, 38 yards, 0:08)	NCSU 27–7
4	10:46	TTU	Donovan Smith 3 yard run (Trey Wollf kick) (12 plays, 75 yards, 3:34)	NCSU 27–14

Statistics	TTU	NCSU
First downs	20	15
Total yards	353	270
Rushing yards	54	111
Passing yards	299	159
Turnovers	4	1
Time of possession	26:56	33:04

Team	Category	Player	Statistics
Texas Tech	Passing	Donovan Smith	21–36, 214 yards, 1 TD, 2 INT
Texas Tech	Rushing	SaRodorick Thompson	9 carries, 39 yards
Texas Tech	Receiving	Myles Price	4 receptions, 50 yards, 1 TD
NC State	Passing	Devin Leary	15–23, 121 yards
NC State	Rushing	Jordan Houston	13 carries, 57 yards
NC State	Receiving	Demie Sumo-Karngbaye	4 receptions, 93 yards, 1 TD

=== UConn ===
UConn at No. 12 NC State

Team	1	2	3	4	Total
Huskies	0	3	0	7	10
• No. 12 Wolfpack	17	14	7	3	41

- Date: September 24, 2022
- Location: Carter–Finley Stadium
  Raleigh, NC
- Game start: 7:30 p.m. EDT
- Elapsed time: 2 hours, 55 minutes
- Game attendance: 56,919
- Game weather: 75 °F (24 °C) • Weather: Sunny • Wind: SW 2 MPH
- Referee: Gary Patterson
- TV announcers (ACCRSN): Evan Lepler (play–by–play), James Bates (analyst), and Lauren Jbara (sideline reporter)

Scoring summary
1	14:46	NCSU	Thayer Thomas 75 yard pass from Devin Leary (Christopher Dunn kick) (1 play, 75 yards, 0:14)	NCSU 7–0
1	07:26	NCSU	Demie Sumo-Karngbaye 20 yard run (Christopher Dunn kick) (9 plays, 62 yards, 4:19)	NCSU 14–0
1	00:51	NCSU	Christopher Dunn 48 yard field goal (11 plays, 40 yards, 4:32)	NCSU 17–0
2	09:32	NCSU	Devin Carter 1 yard pass from Devin Leary (Christopher Dunn kick) (10 plays, 77 yards, 4:41)	NCSU 24–0
2	02:53	NCSU	Keyon Lesane 2 yard pass from Devin Leary (Christopher Dunn kick) (11 plays, 71 yards, 5:07)	NCSU 31–0
2	00:00	CONN	Noe Ruelas 28 yard field goal (4 plays, 1 yard, 0:46)	NCSU 31–3
3	04:17	NCSU	Porter Rooks 4 yard pass from Devin Leary (Collin Smith kick) (8 plays, 52 yards, 3:38)	NCSU 38–3
4	13:22	NCSU	Collin Smith 40 yard field goal (11 plays, 50 yards, 3:49)	NCSU 41–3
4	02:08	CONN	Victor Rose 11 yard run (Noe Ruelas kick) (10 plays, 70 yards, 3:49)	NCSU 41–10

Statistics	CONN	NCSU
First downs	8	29
Total yards	160	492
Rushing yards	121	169
Passing yards	39	323
Turnovers	0	1
Time of possession	24:31	35:29

Team	Category	Player	Statistics
UConn	Passing	Zion Turner	10–12, 39 yards
UConn	Rushing	Victor Rosa	6 carries, 43 yards, 1 TD
UConn	Receiving	Devontae Houston	3 receptions, 22 yards
NC State	Passing	Devin Leary	32–44, 320 yards, 4 TD, 1 INT
NC State	Rushing	Michael Allen	10 carries, 66 yards
NC State	Receiving	Thayer Thomas	5 receptions, 115 yards, 1 TD

=== At No. 5 Clemson ===
No. 10 NC State at No. 5 Clemson

Team	1	2	3	4	Total
No. 10 Wolfpack	3	7	3	7	20
• No. 5 Tigers	3	10	7	10	30

- Date: October 1, 2022
- Location: Memorial Stadium
  Clemson, SC
- Game start: 7:30 p.m. EDT
- Elapsed time: 3 hours, 37 minutes
- Game attendance: 81,500
- Game weather: 69 °F (21 °C) • Weather: Cloudy • Wind: N 5 MPH
- Referee: Marcus Wood
- TV announcers (ABC (College Gameday)): Chris Fowler (play–by–play), Kirk Herbstreit (analyst), and Holly Rowe (sideline reporter)

Scoring summary
1	08:22	CLEM	B. T. Potter 20 yard field goal (13 plays, 72 yards, 6:38)	CLEM 3–0
1	00:19	NCSU	Christopher Dunn 20 yard field goal (15 plays, 78 yards, 7:59)	Tied 3–3
2	5:47	CLEM	B.T. Potter 46 yard field goal (14 plays, 59 yards, 7:27)	CLEM 6–3
2	01:51	NCSU	Ced Seabrough 2 yard pass from Devin Leary (Christopher Dunn kick) (9 plays, 75 yards, 3:56)	NCSU 10–6
2	00:31	CLEM	DJ Uiagalelei 1 yard run (B.T. Potter kick) (8 plays, 75 yards, 1:20)	CLEM 13–10
3	11:36	CLEM	Jake Briningstool 7 yard pass from DJ Uiagalelei (B.T. Potter kick) (4 plays, 58 yards, 1:52)	CLEM 20–10
3	09:06	NCSU	Christopher Dunn 49 yard field goal (10 plays, 43 yards, 2:30)	CLEM 20–13
4	14:16	CLEM	B.T. Potter 44 yard field goal (7 plays, 25 yards, 3:18)	CLEM 23–13
4	03:04	CLEM	DJ Uiagalelei 9 yard run (B.T. Potter kick) (9 plays, 58 yards, 4:35)	CLEM 30–13
4	00:53	NCSU	Devin Leary 4 yard run (Christopher Dunn kick) (8 plays, 75 yards, 2:11)	CLEM 30–20

Statistics	NCSU	CLEM
First downs	20	20
Total yards	279	358
Rushing yards	34	149
Passing yards	245	209
Turnovers	2	0
Time of possession	26:40	32:27

Team	Category	Player	Statistics
NC State	Passing	Devin Leary	28–47, 245 yards, 1 TD, 1 INT
NC State	Rushing	Jordan Houston	7 carries, 32 yards
NC State	Receiving	Thayer Thomas	9 receptions, 84 yards
Clemson	Passing	DJ Uiagalelei	21–30, 209 yards, 1 TD
Clemson	Rushing	DJ Uiagalelei	14 carries, 73 yards, 2 TD
Clemson	Receiving	Jake Briningstool	4 receptions, 54 yards, 1 TD

=== Florida State ===
Florida State at No. 14 NC State

Team	1	2	3	4	Total
Seminoles	0	17	0	0	17
• No. 14 Wolfpack	3	0	10	6	19

- Date: October 8, 2022
- Location: Carter–Finley Stadium
  Raleigh, NC
- Game start: 8:00 p.m. EDT
- Elapsed time: 3 hours, 47 minutes
- Game attendance: 56,919
- Game weather: 55 °F (13 °C) • Weather: Clear • Wind: NE 2 MPH
- Referee: Jeff Flanagan
- TV announcers (ACCN): Mike Monaco (play–by–play), Tim Hasselbeck (analyst), and Kelsey Riggs (sideline reporter)

Scoring summary
1	03:06	NCSU	Christopher Dunn 38 yard field goal (7 plays, 38 yards, 2:44)	NCSU 3–0
2	11:29	FSU	Mycah Pittman 14 yard pass from Jordan Travis (Ryan Fitzgerald kick) (2 plays, 85 yards, 0:49)	FSU 7–3
2	00:48	FSU	Lawrance Toafili 12 yard run (Ryan Fitzgerald kick) (7 plays, 72 yards, 3:25)	FSU 14–3
2	00:00	FSU	Ryan Fitzgerald 47 yard field goal (2 plays, 7 yards, 0:10)	FSU 17–3
3	09:49	NCSU	Darryl Jones 10 yard pass from Devin Leary (Christopher Dunn kick) (10 plays, 84 yards, 5:05)	FSU 17–10
3	00:57	NCSU	Christopher Dunn 40 yard field goal (10 plays, 52 yards, 4:51)	FSU 17–13
4	12:07	NCSU	Christopher Dunn 53 yard field goal (4 plays, -23 yards, 2:39)	FSU 17–16
4	06:33	NCSU	Christopher Dunn 27 yard field goal (8 plays, 47 yards, 4:38)	NCSU 19–17

Statistics	FSU	NCSU
First downs	15	19
Total yards	387	307
Rushing yards	206	182
Passing yards	181	125
Turnovers	2	1
Time of possession	26:36	33:24

Team	Category	Player	Statistics
Florida State	Passing	Jordan Travis	15–30, 181 yards, 1 TD, 2 INT
Florida State	Rushing	Jordan Travis	7 carries, 108 yards
Florida State	Receiving	Johnny Wilson	2 receptions, 60 yards
NC State	Passing	Devin Leary	10–21, 131 yards, 1 TD, 1 INT
NC State	Rushing	Jordan Houston	24 carries, 90 yards
NC State	Receiving	Jordan Houston	2 receptions, 41 yards

=== At No. 18 Syracuse ===
No. 15 NC State at No. 18 Syracuse

Team	1	2	3	4	Total
No. 15 Wolfpack	3	0	3	3	9
• No. 18 Orange	7	3	7	7	24

- Date: October 15, 2022
- Location: JMA Wireless Dome
  Syracuse, NY
- Game start: 3:30 p.m. EDT
- Game attendance: 49,705
- Game weather: Indoor
- Referee: Jeff Heaser
- TV announcers (ACCN): Mike Monaco (play–by–play), Tim Hasselbeck (analyst), and Kelsey Riggs (sideline reporter)

Scoring summary
1	12:56	CUSE	Oronde Gadsden II 12 yard pass from Garrett Shrader (Andre Szmyt kick) (5 plays, 65 yards, 2:04)	CUSE 7–0
1	03:11	NCSU	Christopher Dunn 20 yard field goal (12 plays, 48 yards, 7:14)	CUSE 7–3
2	14:12	CUSE	Andre Szmyt 22 yard field goal (9 plays, 71 yards, 3:59)	CUSE 10–3
3	07:07	NCSU	Christopher Dunn 42 yard field goal (14 plays, 50 yards, 7:53)	CUSE 10–6
3	01:28	CUSE	Oronde Gadsden II 17 yard pass from Garrett Shrader (Andre Szmyt kick) (13 plays, 78 yards, 5:34)	CUSE 17–6
4	06:58	NCSU	Christopher Dunn 36 yard field goal (18 plays, 56 yards, 9:30)	CUSE 17–9
4	02:20	CUSE	Sean Tucker 25 yard run (Andre Szmyt kick) (9 plays, 65 yards, 4:38)	CUSE 24–9

Statistics	NCSU	CUSE
First downs	16	20
Total yards	255	389
Rushing yards	95	179
Passing yards	160	210
Turnovers	0	2
Time of possession	35:06	24:54

Team	Category	Player	Statistics
NC State	Passing	Jack Chambers	18–30, 160 yards
NC State	Rushing	Jack Chambers	19 carries, 58 yards
NC State	Receiving	Keyon Lesane	4 receptions, 39 yards
Syracuse	Passing	Garrett Shrader	16–25, 210 yards, 2 TD, 2 INT
Syracuse	Rushing	Sean Tucker	14 carries, 98 yards, 1 TD
Syracuse	Receiving	Oronde Gadsden II	8 receptions, 141 yards, 2 TD

=== Virginia Tech ===
Virginia Tech at No. 24 NC State

Team	1	2	3	4	Total
Hokies	0	0	21	0	21
• No. 24 Wolfpack	0	3	7	12	22

- Date: October 27, 2022
- Location: Carter–Finley Stadium
  Raleigh, NC
- Game start: 7:30 p.m. EDT
- Elapsed time: 3 hours, 27 minutes
- Game attendance: 56,919
- Game weather: 58 °F (14 °C) • Weather: Clear • Wind: NE 5 MPH
- Referee: Adam Savoie
- TV announcers (ESPN): Matt Barrie (play-by-play), Dan Mullen (analyst), and Harry Lyles, Jr. (sideline reporter)

Scoring summary
2	00:05	NCSU	Christopher Dunn 35 yard field goal (8 plays, 25 yards, 1:08)	NCSU 3–0
3	12:51	VT	Grant Wells 4 yard run (William Ross kick) (6 plays, 78 yards, 2:03)	VT 7–3
3	09:18	VT	Kaleb Smith 85 yard pass from Grant Wells (William Ross kick) (1 plays, 80 yards, 0:11)	VT 14–3
3	04:02	VT	Grant Wells 20 yard run (William Ross kick) (5 plays, 65 yards, 2:26)	VT 21–3
3	01:42	NCSU	Thayer Thomas 35 yard pass from MJ Morris (Christopher Dunn kick) (6 plays, 75 yards, 2:20)	VT 21–10
4	12:15	NCSU	Trent Pennix 7 yard pass from MJ Morris (Two-point conversion failed) (3 plays, 52 yards, 1:12)	VT 21–16
4	7:38	NCSU	Thayer Thomas 18 yard pass from MJ Morris (Two-point conversion failed) (7 plays, 60 yards, 3:01)	NCSU 22–21

Statistics	VT	NCSU
First downs	10	21
Total yards	293	356
Rushing yards	50	60
Passing yards	243	296
Turnovers	0	0
Time of possession	23:56	36:04

Team	Category	Player	Statistics
Virginia Tech	Passing	Grant Wells	11–22, 243 yards, 1 TD
Virginia Tech	Rushing	Malachi Thomas	9 carries, 21 yards
Virginia Tech	Receiving	Kaleb Smith	3 receptions, 141 yards, 1 TD
NC State	Passing	MJ Morris	20–29, 265 yards, 3 TD
NC State	Rushing	Jordan Houston	9 carries, 31 yards
NC State	Receiving	Thayer Thomas	10 receptions, 118 yards, 2 TD

=== No. 21 Wake Forest ===
No. 21 Wake Forest at No. 22 NC State

Team	1	2	3	4	Total
No. 21 Demon Deacons	0	14	0	7	21
• No. 22 Wolfpack	3	14	10	3	30

- Date: November 5, 2022
- Location: Carter–Finley Stadium
  Raleigh, NC
- Game start: 8:00 p.m. EDT
- Elapsed time: 3 hours, 27 minutes
- Game attendance: 56,919
- Game weather: 71 °F (22 °C) • Weather: Clear • Wind: SE 8 MPH
- Referee: Jeff Heaser
- TV announcers (ACCN): Dave O'Brien (play–by–play), Tim Hasselbeck (analyst), and Kelsey Riggs (sideline reporter)

Scoring summary
1	8:04	NCSU	Christopher Dunn 33 yard field goal (8 plays, 28 yards, 4:14)	NCSU 3–0
2	10:19	WAKE	Christian Turner 2 yard run (Matthew Dennis kick) (10 plays, 75 yards, 4:00)	WAKE 7–3
2	7:39	NCSU	Keyon Lesane 12 yard pass from MJ Morris (Christopher Dunn kick) (6 plays, 71 yards, 2:30)	NCSU 10–7
2	4:11	WAKE	Taylor Morin 24 yard pass from Sam Hartman (Matthew Dennis kick) (8 plays, 75 yards, 3:28)	WAKE 14–10
2	1:30	NCSU	Darryl Jones 13 yard pass from MJ Morris (Christopher Dunn kick) (8 plays, 64 yards, 2:33)	NCSU 17–14
3	6:14	NCSU	Darryl Jones 1 yard pass from MJ Morris (Christopher Dunn kick) (15 plays, 80 yards, 7:33)	NCSU 24–14
3	2:01	NCSU	Christopher Dunn 51 yard field goal (5 plays, 17 yards, 2:17)	NCSU 27–14
4	6:54	WAKE	A. T. Perry 29 yard pass from Sam Hartman (13 plays, 99 yards, 4:18)	NCSU 27–21
4	2:54	NCSU	Christopher Dunn 25 yard field goal (9 plays, 62 yards, 4:00)	NCSU 30–21

Statistics	WAKE	NCSU
First downs	22	24
Total yards	414	325
Rushing yards	17	115
Passing yards	397	210
Turnovers	3	0
Time of possession	26:38	33:22

Team	Category	Player	Statistics
Wake Forest	Passing	Sam Hartman	29–48, 397 yards, 2 TD, 3 INT
Wake Forest	Rushing	Christian Turner	8 carries, 29 yards, 1 TD
Wake Forest	Receiving	A. T. Perry	12 receptions, 159 yards, 1 TD
NC State	Passing	MJ Morris	18–28, 210 yards, 3 TD
NC State	Rushing	Jordan Houston	12 carries, 53 yards
NC State	Receiving	Thayer Thomas	8 receptions, 79 yards

=== Boston College ===
Boston College at No. 16 NC State

Team	1	2	3	4	Total
• Eagles	7	0	7	7	21
No. 16 Wolfpack	14	3	3	0	20

- Date: November 12, 2022
- Location: Carter–Finley Stadium
  Raleigh, NC
- Game start: 3:30 p.m. EST
- Elapsed time: 3 hours, 46 minutes
- Game attendance: 56,919
- Game weather: 72 °F (22 °C) • Weather: Cloudy • Wind: SW 8 MPH
- Referee: Timothy Hedgepeth
- TV announcers (ACCN): Mike Monaco (play–by–play), Roddy Jones (analyst), and Taylor Davis (sideline reporter)

Scoring summary
1	10:20	NCSU	Trent Pennix 27 yard pass from MJ Morris (Christopher Dunn kick) (5 plays, 88 yards, 1:58)	NCSU 7–0
1	05:42	NCSU	MJ Morris 10 yard run (Christopher Dunn kick) (6 plays, 68 yards, 2:09)	NCSU 14–0
1	02:30	BC	Zay Flowers 17 yard pass from Emmett Morehead (Connor Lytton kick) (8 plays, 75 yards, 3:12)	NCSU 14–7
2	01:36	NCSU	Christopher Dunn 30 yard field goal (7 plays, 36 yards, 3:16)	NCSU 17–7
3	11:11	NCSU	Christopher Dunn 45 yard field goal (5 plays, 14 yards, 2:23)	NCSU 20–7
3	07:13	BC	Zay Flowers 35 yard pass from Emmett Morehead (Connor Lytton kick) (8 plays, 75 yards, 3:58)	NCSU 20–14
4	00:14	BC	Joe Griffin 2 yard pass from Emmett Morehead (Christopher Dunn kick) (12 plays, 69 yards, 2:33)	BC 21–20

Statistics	BC	NCSU
First downs	17	21
Total yards	329	335
Rushing yards	-1	200
Passing yards	330	135
Turnovers	3	4
Time of possession	29:43	30:17

Team	Category	Player	Statistics
Boston College	Passing	Emmett Morehead	29–48, 330 yards, 3 TD, 2 INT
Boston College	Rushing	Alex Broome	6 carries, 13 yards
Boston College	Receiving	Zay Flowers	7 receptions, 130 yards, 2 TD
NC State	Passing	MJ Morris	12–24, 135 yards, 1 TD, 1 INT
NC State	Rushing	Michael Allen	14 carries, 77 yards
NC State	Receiving	Trent Pennix	2 receptions, 53 yards, 1 TD

=== At Louisville ===
No. 24 NC State at Louisville

Team	1	2	3	4	Total
No. 24 Wolfpack	0	3	7	0	10
• Cardinals	0	13	0	12	25

- Date: November 19, 2022
- Location: Cardinal Stadium
  Louisville, KY
- Game start: 3:30 p.m. EST
- Elapsed time: 3 hours, 35 minutes
- Game attendance: 38,974
- Game weather: 38 °F (3 °C) • Weather: Sunny • Wind: NE 15 MPH
- Referee: Stuart Mullins
- TV announcers (ACCRSN): Evan Lepler (play-by-play), Roddy Jones (analyst), and Rebecca Fiorentino (sideline reporter)

Scoring summary
2	09:33	LOU	James Turner 26 yard field goal (5 plays, 41 yards, 2:04)	LOU 3–0
2	04:46	NCSU	Christopher Dunn 30 yard field goal (13 plays, 62 yards, 4:47)	Tied 3–3
2	04:31	LOU	Jawhar Jordan 98 yard kickoff return (James Turner kick)	LOU 10–3
2	00:00	LOU	James Turner 22 yard field goal (11 plays, 61 yards, 2:21)	LOU 13–3
3	07:46	NCSU	Michael Allen 34 yard pass from Ben Finley (Christopher Dunn kick) (5 plays, 87 yards, 2:34)	LOU 13–10
4	13:57	LOU	James Turner 30 yard field goal (8 plays, 68 yards, 3:17)	LOU 16–10
4	10:05	LOU	Jordan Jawhar 2 yard run (Two-point conversion failed) (4 plays, 45 yards, 2:10)	LOU 22–10
4	05:07	LOU	James Turner 28 yard field goal (5 plays, 29 yards, 1:46)	LOU 25–10

Statistics	NCSU	LOU
First downs	20	16
Total yards	291	345
Rushing yards	77	192
Passing yards	214	153
Turnovers	1	0
Time of possession	30:34	29:26

Team	Category	Player	Statistics
NC State	Passing	Ben Finley	16–35, 201 yards, 1 TD, 1 INT
NC State	Rushing	Jordan Houston	8 carries, 41 yards
NC State	Receiving	Darryl Jones	4 receptions, 60 yards
Louisville	Passing	Brock Domann	12–25, 153 yards
Louisville	Rushing	Jawhar Jordan	16 carries, 105 yards, 1 TD
Louisville	Receiving	Tyler Hudson	6 receptions, 85 yards

=== At No. 17 North Carolina ===
NC State at No. 17 North Carolina

Team	1	2	3	4	OT	2OT	Total
• Wolfpack	7	10	0	7	3	3	30
No. 17 Tar Heels	3	7	0	14	3	0	27

- Date: November 25, 2022
- Location: Kenan Stadium
  Chapel Hill, NC
- Game start: 3:30 p.m. EST
- Elapsed time: 3 hours, 57 minutes
- Game attendance: 50,500
- Game weather: 64 °F (18 °C) • Weather: Cloudy • Wind: NW 6 MPH
- Referee: Mike Roche
- TV announcers (ABC): Dave Pasch (play-by-play), Dusty Dvoracek (analyst), and Tom Luginbill (sideline reporter)

Scoring summary
1	13:20	NCSU	Jack Chambers 2 yd. rush (Christopher Dunn kick) (3 plays, 67 yards, 0:49)	NCSU 7–0
1	5:13	UNC	Noah Burnette 37 yd. field goal (15 plays, 62 yards, 6:13)	NCSU 7–3
2	12:38	NCSU	Terrell Timmons 28 yd. pass from Ben Finley (Christopher Dunn kick) (7 plays, 55 yards, 3:17)	NCSU 14–3
2	5:03	UNC	Elijah Green 9 yd. rush (Noah Burnette kick) (8 plays, 59 yards, 3:30)	NCSU 14–10
2	0:00	NCSU	Christopher Dunn 29 yd. field goal (7 plays, 32 yards, 0:38)	NCSU 17–10
4	7:53	UNC	Drake Maye 14 yd. rush (Noah Burnette kick) (4 plays, 38 yards, 1:48)	Tied 17–17
4	3:54	NCSU	Devin Carter 26 yd. pass from Ben Finley (Christopher Dunn kick) (3 plays, 29 yards, 0:52)	NCSU 24–17
4	0:00	UNC	Antoine Green 4 yd. pass from Drake Maye (Nosh Burnette kick) (15 plays, 75 yards, 3:54)	Tied 24–24
OT1		UNC	Noah Burnette 26 yd. field goal (6 plays, 17 yards)	UNC 27–24
OT1		NSCU	Christopher Dunn 31 yd. field goal (5 plays, 11 yards)	Tied 27–27
OT2		NCSU	Christopher Dunn 21 yd. field goal	NCSU 30–27

Statistics	NCSU	UNC
First downs	17	23
Total yards	330	351
Rushing yards	59	118
Passing yards	271	233
Turnovers	1	1
Time of possession	25:48	34:12

Team	Category	Player	Statistics
NC State	Passing	Ben Finley	27–40, 271 yards, 2 TD
NC State	Rushing	Michael Allen	12 carries, 53 yards
NC State	Receiving	Devin Carter	6 receptions, 130 yards, 1 TD
North Carolina	Passing	Drake Maye	29–49, 253 yards, 1 TD, 1 INT
North Carolina	Rushing	Elijah Green	24 carries, 83 yards, 1 TD
North Carolina	Receiving	Antoine Green	8 receptions, 67 yards, 1 TD

=== Vs. Maryland–Duke's Mayo Bowl ===
Of some note, Gary Hahn, a radio broadcaster for this bowl game, was suspended indefinitely after making a remark about "illegal aliens in El Paso" while sharing score updates from around the country.

No. 23 NC State vs Maryland

Team	1	2	3	4	Total
• Terrapins	3	7	3	3	16
No. 23 Wolfpack	3	6	0	3	12

- Date: December 30, 2022
- Location: Bank of America Stadium
  Charlotte, NC
- Game start: Noon EST
- Game attendance: 37,228
- Game weather: Cloudy • Temperature: 58 °F (14 °C) • Wind: 1 mph (1.6 km/h) east
- Referee: Mike McCabe
- TV announcers (ESPN/ESPN Radio): Anish Shroff (play–by–play), Brock Osweiler (analyst), and Andraya Carter (sideline reporter)/Bill Roth (play-by-play), Charles Arbuckle (analyst), and Dana Boyle (sideline reporter)
- Source: Box score

Scoring summary
1	6:10	NCSU	Christopher Dunn 38-yard field goal (7 plays, 59 yards, 2:53)	NCSU 3–0
1	3:24	UMD	Chad Ryland 42-yard field goal (5 plays, 29 yards, 2:46)	TIED 3–3
2	8:07	UMD	Octavian Smith Jr. 19-yard touchdown reception from Taulia Tagovailoa (Chad Ryland kick) (8 plays, 68 yards, 3:33)	UMD 10–3
2	4:37	NCSU	Christopher Dunn 19-yard field goal (11 plays, 73 yards, 3:30)	UMD 10–6
2	0:14	NCSU	Christopher Dunn 38-yard field goal (7 plays, 32 yards, 0:58)	UMD 10–9
3	8:06	UMD	Chad Ryland 33-yard field goal (12 plays, 59 yards, 4:52)	UMD 13–9
4	9:23	NCSU	Christopher Dunn 26-yard field goal (5 plays, 26 yards, 1:50)	UMD 13–12
4	5:36	UMD	Chad Ryland 45-yard field goal (10 plays, 48 yards, 3:47)	UMD 16–12

Statistics	UMD	NCSU
First downs	17	13
Total yards	342	296
Rushing yards	76	27
Passing yards	266	269
Turnovers	2	2
Time of possession	35:34	24:26

Team	Category	Player	Statistics
Maryland	Passing	Taulia Tagovailoa	19/37, 221 yards, TD, 2 INT
Maryland	Rushing	Roman Hemby	24 carries, 65 yards
Maryland	Receiving	Jeshaun Jones	4 receptions, 79 yards
NC State	Passing	Ben Finley	22/48, 269 yards, 2 INT
NC State	Rushing	Jordan Houston	9 carries, 14 yards
NC State	Receiving	Thayer Thomas	4 receptions, 54 yards

== Rankings ==
Ranking movements Legend: ██ Increase in ranking ██ Decrease in ranking — = Not ranked RV = Received votes
	Week															
Poll	Pre	1	2	3	4	5	6	7	8	9	10	11	12	13	14	Final
AP	13	18	16	12	10	14	15	23	24	21	17	RV	—	RV	25	RV
Coaches	13	13	12	11	10	14	13	23	23	20	16	25	—	RV	RV	—
CFP	Not released									22	16	24	—	25	23	Not released
