= Clear Water Academy =

School in Calgary, Alberta, Canada

Coordinates: 51.0196°N 114.119°W

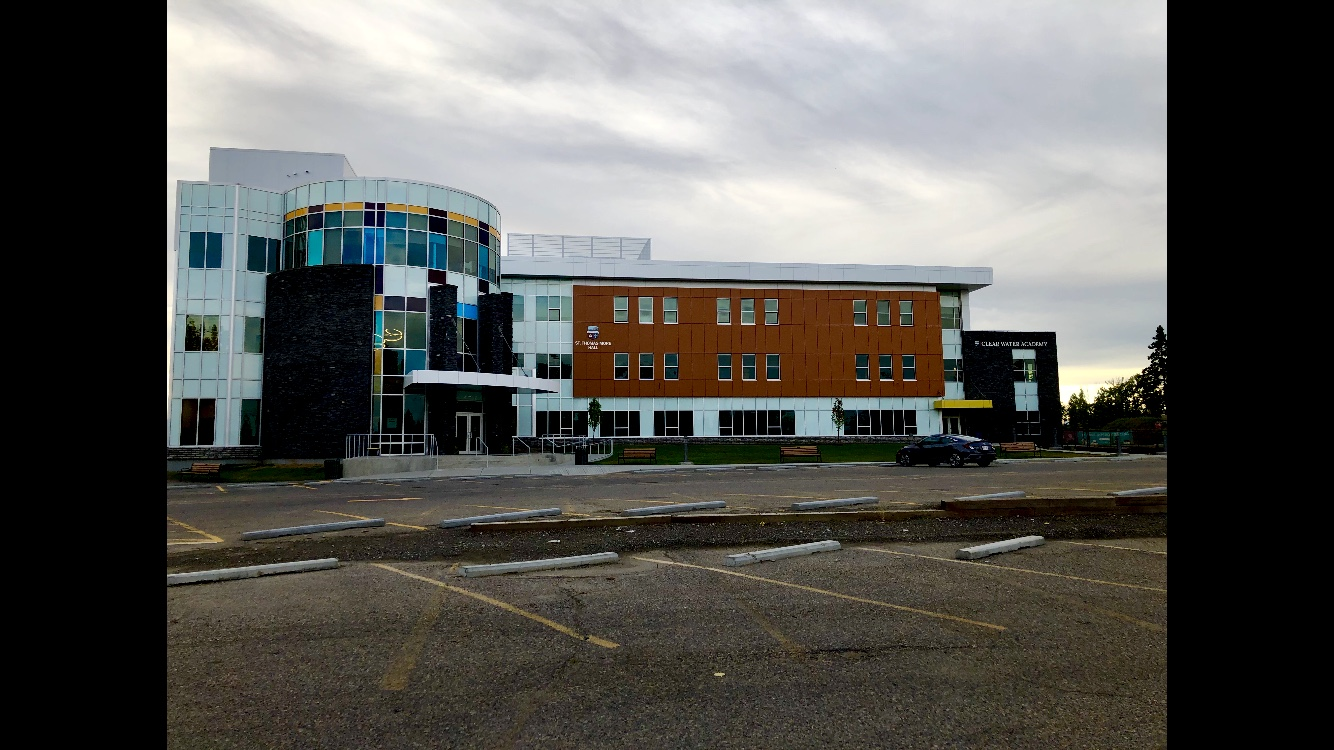

Information
- Religious affiliation: Catholicism
- Established: 1995; 31 years ago
- Staff: 42
- Grades: Pre-Kindergarten - Grade 12
- Gender: Mixed (taught separately in Grades 4-9)
- Enrollment: c.400
- Affiliation: Legionaries of Christ
- Website: www.clearwateracademy.com

Clear Water Academy is a private university preparatory school managed by the Legion of Christ which is located in Calgary, Alberta. It is one of the few private Catholic schools in Alberta, and is dedicated to its four pillars for Catholic formation: Intellectual Formation, Character Formation, Apostolic Formation, and Spiritual Formation. Clear Water runs from Pre-Kindergarten to Grade Twelve, with Grades 4 through 9 being gender separated for all classes. High school is gender separated for selected classes, such as religion and physical education. All students are required to wear a uniform.

== History ==
Clear Water Academy was founded in 1995 with 24 students and two teachers, located in a rented downtown office. From there, Clear Water Academy continued to grow steadily. At the present, Clear Water houses over 400 students and 42 staff in three buildings located in CFB Calgary. Construction of a new building for the school began in 2018. The new building was completed in 2020 for use in the 2020–2021 school year.

== Academics ==
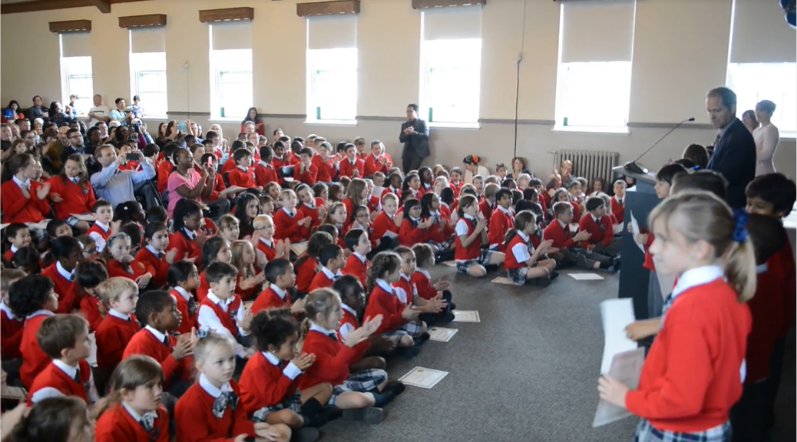
The Awards Ceremony for 2016. The award being handed out in the image is the Language Award, awarded to students with skill in world languages.

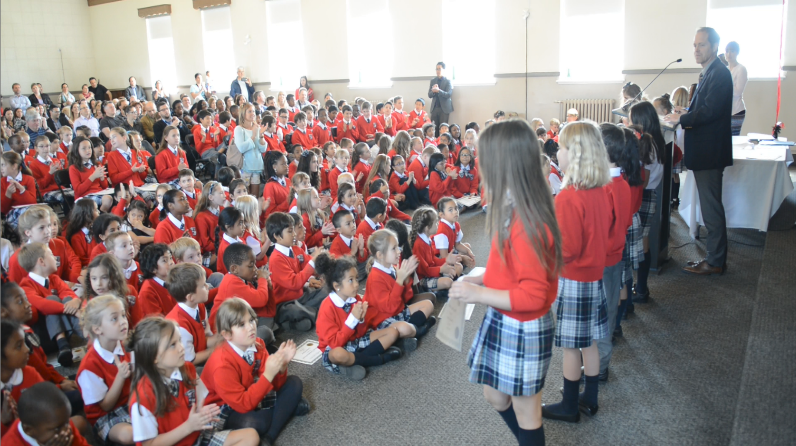
The Awards Ceremony for 2016. The award being handed out in the image is the Arts Award, awarded to students with skill in the arts.

Clear Water Academy offers all regular classes taught at most schools, from Science, to English, to Social Studies, to French. They also teach Spanish, rare among schools in Canada. Options include art and drama and, in grade 11–12, the option of either Physical Education 20 and 30, or Physics 20 and 30. In 2011, Clear Water Academy was ranked number 1 elementary school in Alberta by the Fraser Institute in the 2011 report, based on Provincial Achievement test marks for students in grades 3 and 6. The school ranked 1st place in 2006 as well. In 2019, Clear Water Academy ranked 9th best elementary school in Alberta by the Fraser Institute. The school's high school program wasn't listed in the report.

== Athletics ==
Clear Water Academy competes with other private schools in the City of Calgary in most major sports, including volleyball, basketball, soccer, track and field, cross country running, golf, and badminton. Outdoor Education is a course offered at Clear Water from grades 7-10, which allows for students in these grades to participate weekly in various activities that are too time-consuming or difficult to cover in a normal physical education class.
