= Daniel Jackson (American football) =

American gridiron football player (born 2002)

Profile
- Position: Wide receiver

Personal information
- Born: April 25, 2002 (age 24); Kansas City, Kansas, U.S.
- Listed height: 5 ft 11 in (1.80 m)
- Listed weight: 193 lb (88 kg)

Career information
- High school: Bishop Miege (Roeland Park, Kansas)
- College: Minnesota (2020–2024)
- NFL draft: 2025: undrafted

Career history
- Houston Texans (2025)*; Ottawa Redblacks (2026)*
- * Offseason or practice squad member only

Awards and highlights
- Second-team All-Big Ten (2023)
- Stats at Pro Football Reference

Daniel Jackson (born April 25, 2002) is an American professional football wide receiver. He played college football for the Minnesota Golden Gophers.

== Early life ==
Jackson attended Bishop Miege High School in Roeland Park, Kansas. As a senior, he had 74 receptions for 1,511 yards and 27 touchdowns. He committed to the University of Minnesota to play college football.

== College career ==
As a true freshman at Minnesota in 2020, Jackson played in seven games and had 12 receptions for 167 yards. As a sophomore in 2021, he started eight of 11 games and had 25 receptions for 267 yards and one touchdown. As a junior in 2022, Jackson led the team with 557 receiving yards and five touchdowns on 37 receptions. As a junior in 2023, he started all 13 games and led the team with 59 receptions for 831 yards and eight touchdowns. Jackson returned to Minnesota for his final year of eligibility in 2024 rather than entering the 2024 NFL draft.

== Professional career ==
Pre-draft measurables
Height	Weight	Arm length	Hand span	40-yard dash	10-yard split	20-yard split	20-yard shuttle	Three-cone drill	Vertical jump	Broad jump	Bench press
5 ft 10 3/4 in (1.80 m)	193 lb (88 kg)	30 3/4 in (0.78 m)	9 in (0.23 m)	4.65 s	1.60 s	2.64 s	4.07 s	6.78 s	38.5 in (0.98 m)	10 ft 5 in (3.18 m)	11 reps
All values from NFL Combine/Pro Day

=== Houston Texans ===
Jackson was signed by the Houston Texans as an undrafted free agent on May 9, 2025. He was waived on August 26 as part of final roster cuts.

=== Ottawa Redblacks ===
On February 19, 2026, it was announced that Jackson had signed with the Ottawa Redblacks. He was released on May 13.
