= 1979–80 NCAA football bowl games =

College football postseason game series

- Season: 1979
- Number of bowls: 15
- Bowl games: December 15, 1979 – January 1, 1980
- National Championship: 1980 Sugar Bowl
- Location of Championship: Louisiana Superdome, New Orleans, Louisiana
- Champions: Alabama
Bowl record by conference
Conference	Bowls	Record	Final AP poll

The 1979–80 NCAA football bowl games were a series of post-season games played in December 1979 and January 1980 to end the 1979 NCAA Division I-A football season. A total of 15 team-competitive games, were played. The post-season began with the Garden State Bowl on December 15, 1979, and concluded on January 1, 1980, with the Orange Bowl.

== Schedule ==
Date	Game	Site	TV	Teams	Results
Dec. 15	Garden State Bowl	Giants Stadium; East Rutherford, New Jersey	Mizlou	No. 20 Temple Owls (9–2); California Golden Bears (7–4)	Temple 28; California 17
Dec. 15	Independence Bowl	State Fair Stadium; Shreveport, Louisiana	TBS	Syracuse Orangemen (6–5); McNeese State Cowboys (11–0)	Syracuse 31; McNeese State 7
Dec. 21	Holiday Bowl	Jack Murphy Stadium; San Diego, California	Mizlou	Indiana Hoosiers (7–4); No. 9 BYU Cougars (11–0)	Indiana 38; BYU 37
Dec. 22	Sun Bowl	Sun Bowl; El Paso, Texas	CBS	No. 13 Washington Huskies (9–2); No. 11 Texas Longhorns (9–2)	Washington 14; Texas 7
Dec. 22	Liberty Bowl	Liberty Bowl Memorial Stadium; Memphis, Tennessee	ABC	Penn State Nittany Lions (7–4); No. 15 Tulane Green Wave (9–2)	Penn State 9 Tulane 6
Dec. 22	Tangerine Bowl	Orlando Stadium; Orlando, Florida	Mizlou	LSU Tigers (6–5); Wake Forest Demon Deacons (8–3)	LSU 34; Wake Forest 10
Dec. 25	Fiesta Bowl	Sun Devil Stadium; Tempe, Arizona	NBC	No. 10 Pittsburgh Panthers (10–1); Arizona Wildcats (6–4–1)	Pittsburgh 16; Arizona 10
Dec. 28	Gator Bowl	Gator Bowl Stadium; Jacksonville, Florida	ABC	North Carolina Tar Heels (7–3–1); No. 14 Michigan Wolverines (8–3)	North Carolina 17; Michigan 15
Dec. 29	Hall of Fame Classic	Legion Field; Birmingham, Alabama	Mizlou	Missouri Tigers (6–5); No. 16 South Carolina Gamecocks (8–3)	Missouri 24; South Carolina 14
Dec. 31	Peach Bowl	Fulton County Stadium; Atlanta, Georgia	CBS	No. 19 Baylor Bears (7–4); No. 18 Clemson Tigers (8–3)	Baylor 24; Clemson 18
Dec. 31	Astro-Bluebonnet Bowl	Astrodome; Houston, Texas	Mizlou	No. 12 Purdue Boilermakers (9–2); Tennessee Volunteers (7–4)	Purdue 27; Tennessee 22
Jan. 1	Cotton Bowl Classic	Cotton Bowl; Dallas, Texas	CBS	No. 8 Houston Cougars (10–1); No. 7 Nebraska Cornhuskers (10–1)	Houston 17; Nebraska 14
Jan. 1	Sugar Bowl	Louisiana Superdome; New Orleans, Louisiana	ABC	No. 2 Alabama Crimson Tide (11–0); No. 6 Arkansas Razorbacks (10–1)	Alabama 24; Arkansas 9
Jan. 1	Rose Bowl	Rose Bowl; Pasadena, California	NBC	No. 3 USC Trojans (10–0–1); No. 1 Ohio State Buckeyes (11–0)	USC 17; Ohio State 16
Jan. 1	Orange Bowl	Miami Orange Bowl; Miami, Florida	NBC	No. 5 Oklahoma Sooners (10–1); No. 4 Florida State Seminoles (11–0)	Oklahoma 24; Florida State 7

Rankings from AP Poll
