= 1979 Miami Hurricanes football team =

American college football season

1979 Miami Hurricanes football
- Conference: Independent
- Record: 5–6
- Head coach: Howard Schnellenberger (1st season)
- Offensive coordinator: Kim Helton (1st season)
- Offensive scheme: Pro-style
- Defensive coordinator: Rick Lantz (3rd season)
- Base defense: 4–3
- MVP: Gene Coleman
- Home stadium: Miami Orange Bowl

1979 NCAA Division I-A independents football records
	Conf.					Overall
Team	W		L		T	W		L		T
No. 6 Florida State		–		–		11	–	1	–	0
No. 7 Pittsburgh		–		–		11	–	1	–	0
UNLV		–		–		9	–	1	–	2
No. 17 Temple		–		–		10	–	2	–	0
Tulane		–		–		9	–	3	–	0
Rutgers		–		–		8	–	3	–	0
Tennessee State		–		–		8	–	3	–	0
East Carolina		–		–		7	–	3	–	1
No. 20 Penn State		–		–		8	–	4	–	0
South Carolina		–		–		8	–	4	–	0
Navy		–		–		7	–	4	–	0
Notre Dame		–		–		7	–	4	–	0
Southern Miss		–		–		6	–	4	–	1
Syracuse		–		–		7	–	5	–	0
Colgate		–		–		5	–	4	–	1
Boston College		–		–		5	–	6	–	0
Holy Cross		–		–		5	–	6	–	0
Memphis State		–		–		5	–	6	–	0
Miami (FL)		–		–		5	–	6	–	0
North Texas State		–		–		5	–	6	–	0
Villanova		–		–		5	–	6	–	0
Virginia Tech		–		–		5	–	6	–	0
West Virginia		–		–		5	–	6	–	0
Georgia Tech		–		–		4	–	6	–	1
Louisville		–		–		4	–	6	–	1
William & Mary		–		–		4	–	7	–	0
Illinois State		–		–		3	–	8	–	0
Northeast Louisiana		–		–		3	–	8	–	0
Army		–		–		2	–	8	–	1
Air Force		–		–		2	–	9	–	0
Cincinnati		–		–		2	–	9	–	0
Richmond		–		–		0	–	11	–	0
Rankings from AP Poll

The 1979 Miami Hurricanes football team represented the University of Miami as an independent during the 1979 NCAA Division I-A football season. Led by first-year head coach Howard Schnellenberger, the Hurricanes played their home games at the Miami Orange Bowl in Miami, Florida. Miami finished the season with a record of 5–6.

== Schedule ==
Date	Opponent	Site	TV	Result	Attendance	Source
September 15	Louisville	Miami Orange Bowl; Miami, FL (rivalry)		W 24–12	41,129	
September 22	at No. 14 Florida State	Doak Campbell Stadium; Tallahassee, FL (rivalry)		L 23–40	47,679	
September 29	Louisiana Tech	Miami Orange Bowl; Miami, FL		W 6–0	20,069	
October 6	at No. 1 (I-AA) Florida A&M	Doak Campbell Stadium; Tallahassee, FL		L 13–16	34,743	
October 13	at San Diego State	San Diego Stadium; San Diego, CA		L 20–31	40,126	
October 20	Boston College^{†}	Miami Orange Bowl; Miami, FL		W 19–8	15,013	
October 27	at Syracuse	Rich Stadium; Orchard, Park, NY		L 15–25	7,729	
November 3	at No. 19 Penn State	Beaver Stadium; University Park, PA		W 26–10	77,532	
November 17	at No. 1 Alabama	Bryant–Denny Stadium; Tuscaloosa, AL	ABC	L 0–30	54,500	
November 24	vs. Notre Dame	Korakuen Stadium; Tokyo, Japan (Mirage Bowl) (rivalry)		L 15–40	62,674	
December 1	Florida	Miami Orange Bowl; Miami, FL (rivalry)		W 30–24	28,051	
^{†}Homecoming; Rankings from AP Poll released prior to the game

== Game summaries ==
=== Alabama ===
Quarter	1	2	3	4	Total
Miami (FL)	0	0	0	0	0
Alabama	10	0	7	13	30

at Bryant–Denny Stadium, Tuscaloosa, Alabama

- Date: November 17, 1979
- Game attendance: 54,500
- TV announcers (ABC): Al Michaels and Frank Broyles

Game information

Scoring

Passing

- MIA: Mike Rodrique 4/13, 37 yards, 2 INT, Jim Kelly 2/15, 10 yards, 3 INT
- ALA: Steadman Shealy 9/15, 187 yards

Rushing

- MIA: Chris Hobbs 9–44, Gary Breckner 3–22, Mike Rodrique 3–21
- ALA: Steve Whitman 11–70, Steadman Shealy 14–28, Mitch Ferguson 4–27, Major Ogilvie 9–26, TD

Receiving

- MIA: Larry Brodsky 1–15, Jim Joiner 2–10, Andy Baratta 1–9, Chris Hobbs 1–9
- ALA: Keith Pugh 7–126, Tim Travis 1–56

Scoring summary

Quarter	Time	Drive			Team	Scoring information	Score	
Quarter	Time	Plays	Yards	TOP	Team	Scoring information	Miami (FL)	Alabama
1					Alabama	Tim Travis 56-yard touchdown reception from Steadman Shealy, Alan McElroy kick good	0	7
1					Alabama	24-yard field goal by Alan McElroy	0	10
3					Alabama	Major Ogilvie 1-yard touchdown run, Alan McElroy kick good	0	17
4					Alabama	25-yard field goal by Alan McElroy	0	20
4					Alabama	40-yard field goal by Alan McElroy	0	23
4					Alabama	James Haney 5-yard touchdown run, Alan McElroy kick good	0	30
"TOP" = time of possession. For other American football terms, see Glossary of American football.							0	30

== Personnel ==
1979 Miami Hurricanes football team roster
Players
Coaches
Offense

Pos.	#	Name	Class
RB		Gregory Anderson
OL		Don Bailey
TE		Andy Baratta
OL		Clem Barbarino
WR		Rocky Belk
RB		Albert Bentley
RB		James Bigbie
RB		Gary Breckner
WR		Larry Brodsky
OL		John Canaei
OL		John Fenton
OL		Frank Frazier
OL		Steve Grady
RB		Chris Hobbs
WR	13	Jim Joiner	Jr
OL		Art Kehoe
QB	12	Jim Kelly	Fr
OL		Jim Pokorney
RB		Smokey Roan
QB		Mike Rodrique
RB		Mark Rush
WR		Malcolm Simmons
RB		Taylor Timmons
WR		Pat Walker

Defense

Pos.	#	Name	Class
LB		Mozell Axson
LB		Jay Brophy
DL		Jim Burt
DL		Tony Chickillo
DB		Gene Coleman
LB		Charles Cook
DL		Johnny Daniels
DL		Tim Flanagan
DL		Barry Gonzalez
DB		David Jefferson
DB	31	Fred Marion	So
DT	91	Bob Nelson	So
LB		Scott Nicolas
DB	11	Mark Smith	Jr
DB	2	John Swain	Jr
DL		Lester Williams

Special teams

Pos.	#	Name	Class
P		Greg LaBelle
K		Dan Miller

Head coach

- Howard Schnellenberger

Coordinators/assistant coaches

- Len Fontes – Defensive backs

Legend

- (C) Team captain
- (S) Suspended
- (I) Ineligible
- Injured
- Redshirt

== Statistics ==
=== Passing ===
Player	Comp	Att	Yards	TD	INT
Rodrique	94	201	1,197	2	
Kelly	48	104	721	5	

=== Rushing ===
Player	Att	Yds	TD
Hobbs	105	406	
Roan	97	307	
Breckner	47	179	

=== Receiving ===
Player	Rec	Yards	TD
Brodsky	30	495	
Walker	24	625	
Joiner	24	293	
