= 1979 Ole Miss Rebels football team =

American college football season

1979 Ole Miss Rebels football
- Conference: Southeastern Conference
- Record: 4–7 (3–3 SEC)
- Head coach: Steve Sloan (2nd season)
- Offensive coordinator: John Cropp (2nd season)
- Defensive coordinator: Paul Crane (1st season)
- Home stadium: Hemingway Stadium; Mississippi Veterans Memorial Stadium

1979 Southeastern Conference football standings
	Conf.					Overall
Team	W		L		T	W		L		T
No. 1 Alabama $	6	–	0	–	0	12	–	0	–	0
Georgia	5	–	1	–	0	6	–	5	–	0
No. 16 Auburn	4	–	2	–	0	8	–	3	–	0
LSU	4	–	2	–	0	7	–	5	–	0
Tennessee	3	–	3	–	0	7	–	5	–	0
Kentucky	3	–	3	–	0	5	–	6	–	0
Ole Miss	3	–	3	–	0	4	–	7	–	0
Mississippi State	2	–	4	–	0	3	–	8	–	0
Vanderbilt	0	–	6	–	0	1	–	10	–	0
Florida	0	–	6	–	0	0	–	10	–	1
$ – Conference champion; Rankings from AP Poll

The 1979 Ole Miss Rebels football team represented the University of Mississippi as a member of the Southeastern Conference (SEC) during the 1979 NCAA Division I-A football season. Led by second-year head coach Steve Sloan, the Rebels compiled an overall record of 4–7 with a mark of 3–3 in conference play, placing in a three-way tie for fifth in the SEC. Ole Miss played home games at Hemingway Stadium in Oxford, Mississippi and Mississippi Veterans Memorial Stadium in Jackson, Mississippi.

== Schedule ==
Date	Time	Opponent	Site	TV	Result	Attendance	Source
September 15	7:00 pm	at Memphis State*	Liberty Bowl Memorial Stadium; Memphis, TN (rivalry)		W 38–34	53,166	
September 22	2:30 pm	No. 9 Missouri*	Mississippi Veterans Memorial Stadium; Jackson, MS	ABC	L 7–33	46,000	
September 29	6:00 pm	Southern Miss*	Mississippi Veterans Memorial Stadium; Jackson, MS		L 8–38	46,720	
October 6	1:00 pm	Georgia	Hemingway Stadium; Oxford, MS		L 21–24	35,912	
October 13	2:00 pm	at Kentucky	Commonwealth Stadium; Lexington, KY		L 3–14	57,825	
October 20	7:00 pm	at South Carolina*	Williams–Brice Stadium; Columbia, SC		L 14–21	56,407	
October 27	1:00 pm	Vanderbilt^{†}	Hemingway Stadium; Oxford, MS (rivalry)		W 63–28	35,667	
November 3	1:00 pm	LSU	Mississippi Veterans Memorial Stadium; Jackson, MS (rivalry)		L 24–28	45,548	
November 10	2:30 pm	at Tulane*	Louisiana Superdome; New Orleans, LA (rivalry)	ABC	L 15–49	45,647	
November 17	1:00 pm	No. 19 Tennessee	Mississippi Veterans Memorial Stadium; Jackson, MS (rivalry)		W 44–20	40,128	
November 24	1:00 pm	vs. Mississippi State	Mississippi Veterans Memorial Stadium; Jackson, MS (Egg Bowl)		W 14–9	46,021	
*Non-conference game; ^{†}Homecoming; Rankings from AP Poll released prior to the game

== Game summaries ==
=== Mississippi State ===
Team	1	2	3	4	Total
• Ole Miss	0	0	7	7	14
Mississippi St	3	6	0	0	9

- Date: November 24
- Location: Mississippi Veterans Memorial Stadium

Scoring summary
Q1		MSU	Rye 38 yard field goal	MSU 3−0
Q2		MSU	Collins 90 yard run (kick failed)	MSU 9–0
Q3		MISS	Perry 1 yard run (Langley kick)	MSU 9–7
Q4	7:28	MISS	Toler 29 yard pass from Fourcade (Langley kick)	MISS 14–9

- MISS: John Fourcade 11/17, 143 Yds, 9 Rush, 40 Yds (second player in school history with 2,000 yards total offense in single season – A. Manning, 1969)

== Roster ==
1979 Ole Miss Rebels football team roster
Players
Coaches
Offense

Pos.	#	Name	Class
C	55	Chuck Commiskey	Jr
QB	1	John Fourcade	So
G	63	Gregg Jefcoat	Sr
QB	14	Jim Lear	Jr
TE	86	Don Lloyd	Jr
RB	10	Buford McGee	Fr
OT	70	Mark Moore	Jr
RB	20	Leon Perry (C)	Sr
C	54	Mike Russell	Jr
WR	83	Norman Seawright	Jr
WR	30	Ken Toler	Jr
OT	50	David Traxler	Sr
G	64	Terrence Walker	Sr
WR	36	Freddie Lee Williams	Sr
TE	16	Billy Wise	Jr

Defense

Pos.	#	Name	Class
DT	98	John Johnson	Jr
DT	45	James Jordan	Sr
DB	40	Mike Fountain	Jr
S	34	Phil Freightman	So
LB	47	Eddy Householder (C)	Sr
DT	62	Quentin McDonald	Jr
LB	57	Brian Morehead	Sr
DE	84	James Otis	Fr
DE	89	John Peel (C)	Sr
S	32	Joel Stewart	Sr
CB	17	Brad White	So

Special teams

Pos.	#	Name	Class
P	39	Jim Miller	Sr

Head coach

- Steve Sloan

Coordinators/assistant coaches

Legend

- (C) Team captain
- (S) Suspended
- (I) Ineligible
- Injured
- Redshirt
