= 1979 Florida Gators football team =

American college football season

1979 Florida Gators football
- Conference: Southeastern Conference
- Record: 0–10–1 (0–6 SEC)
- Head coach: Charley Pell (1st season)
- Captains: Bill Bennek; Nap Green; Chuck Hatch
- Home stadium: Florida Field

1979 Southeastern Conference football standings
	Conf.					Overall
Team	W		L		T	W		L		T
No. 1 Alabama $	6	–	0	–	0	12	–	0	–	0
Georgia	5	–	1	–	0	6	–	5	–	0
No. 16 Auburn	4	–	2	–	0	8	–	3	–	0
LSU	4	–	2	–	0	7	–	5	–	0
Tennessee	3	–	3	–	0	7	–	5	–	0
Kentucky	3	–	3	–	0	5	–	6	–	0
Ole Miss	3	–	3	–	0	4	–	7	–	0
Mississippi State	2	–	4	–	0	3	–	8	–	0
Vanderbilt	0	–	6	–	0	1	–	10	–	0
Florida	0	–	6	–	0	0	–	10	–	1
$ – Conference champion; Rankings from AP Poll

The 1979 Florida Gators football team represented the University of Florida during the 1979 NCAA Division I-A football season. The season was Charley Pell's first of six as the head coach of the Florida Gators football team. Pell arrived in Gainesville with a new plan for building the Gators football program—new offensive and defensive schemes, new assistant coaches, a new attitude and new boosters fund-raising model to support the program and improve the stadium and training facilities. Pell's plan would produce many on-the-field victories over the next five years, but his first campaign as the Gators coach produced the most losses in any single season in Gators football history, ending with a winless 0–10–1 overall record and a 0–6 record in the Southeastern Conference (SEC). The team, which was plagued by injuries, placed last among ten SEC teams. This was the last time until 2013 that Florida fielded a team with a losing record.

The 1979 Florida team had 4 starting quarterbacks: Tim Groves, Tyrone Young, John Brown and Larry Ochab, and John Brantley also played at quarterback, though he did not start. Brantley was projected to start at quarterback, but he was injured in the preseason.

== Schedule ==
Date	Opponent	Site	TV	Result	Attendance	Source
September 15	at No. 13 Houston*	Houston Astrodome; Houston, TX		L 10–14	33,851	
September 22	Georgia Tech*	Florida Field; Gainesville, FL		T 7–7	60,313	
September 29	at Mississippi State	Mississippi Veterans Memorial Stadium; Jackson, MS		L 10–24	38,000	
October 6	at No. 17 LSU	Tiger Stadium; Baton Rouge, LA (rivalry)		L 3–20	73,073	
October 13	No. 2 Alabama	Florida Field; Gainesville, FL (rivalry)		L 0–40	64,552	
October 27	Tulsa*	Florida Field; Gainesville, FL		L 10–20	60,126	
November 3	at No. 20 Auburn	Jordan-Hare Stadium; Auburn, AL (rivalry)		L 13–19	58,754	
November 10	vs. Georgia	Gator Bowl Stadium; Jacksonville, FL (rivalry)	ABC	L 10–33	68,148	
November 17	Kentucky	Florida Field; Gainesville, FL (rivalry)		L 3–31	55,760	
November 23	No. 5 Florida State*	Florida Field; Gainesville, FL (rivalry)	ABC	L 16–27	58,263	
December 1	at Miami (FL)*	Miami Orange Bowl; Miami, FL (rivalry)		L 24–30	28,051	
*Non-conference game; Rankings from AP Poll released prior to the game

== Roster ==
1979 Florida Gators football team roster
Players
Coaches
Offense

Pos.	#	Name	Class
TE		Bill Bell
OL		Bill Bennek
QB	12	John Brantley	Sr
QB		Johnell Brown
TE	87	Mike Clark	Jr
WR	21	Cris Collinsworth	Jr
RB		Calvin Davis
TE	80	Chris Faulkner	Fr
WR		Johnny Gaffney
OL		Harold Galloway
QB		Tim Groves
RB		Frank Holloway
OL		Wally Hough
WR		Spencer Jackson
WR	18	Darrell Jones	Sr
RB		James Jones
OL		Ray Lawrence
QB		Larry Ochab	Jr
OL		Phil Pharr
OL		Dan Plonk
RB		Carl Prioleau
WR	19	Johnny Smith	Jr
OL		Jim Subers
RB		John Whittaker
OL		Joe Wickline
RB		Derald Williams
RB		Terry Williams
QB	7	Tyrone Young	Fr

Defense

Pos.	#	Name	Class
DB	43	Thad Adams	Fr
LB	55	Scot Brantley	Sr
DB		Derrick Burdgess
DB	24	Kyle Coburn	Sr
DB		Juan Collins
DL		Dan Fike
DL		Robin Fisher
DB		Bill Fiorillo
DB		Curt Garrett
DL		David Galloway
DB	32	Napoleon Green	Sr
DL		Tim Golden
DB	25	Chuck Hatch	Sr
DB		Dozyier Hinton
DB		Vernon James
DL		Vince Jones
LB		Jim Kreis
LB		David Little
DB		Gordon Pleasants
DL		Bubba Pratt
DE	50	Yancey Sutton	Jr

Special teams

Pos.	#	Name	Class
K	3	Brian Clark	So
P		Bill Conover

Head coach

- Charley Pell

Coordinators/assistant coaches

- Vince Kendrick (RB)

Legend

- (C) Team captain
- (S) Suspended
- (I) Ineligible
- Injured
- Redshirt

== Postseason ==
The next year, in 1980, the Florida Gators made a remarkable turnaround. They won the first three games of that season before a loss to Louisiana State crushed Florida's hopes of being undefeated, but they ended the regular season with 7 wins and 4 losses, and in the Tangerine bowl they defeated Maryland 35-20 to improve to 8-4. At the time, this Florida season was an NCAA record turnaround, and this was the first team to make a bowl game after being winless the previous season.
