= 1979 Vanderbilt Commodores football team =

American college football season

1979 Vanderbilt Commodores football
- Conference: Southeastern Conference
- Record: 1–10 (0–6 SEC)
- Head coach: George MacIntyre (1st season)
- Offensive coordinator: Phillip Fulmer (1st season)
- Defensive coordinator: Ron McCrone (1st season)
- Home stadium: Dudley Field

1979 Southeastern Conference football standings
| | Conf. | | | | | Overall |
| Team | W | | L | | T | W | | L | | T |
|---|---|---|---|---|---|---|---|---|---|---|
| No. 1 Alabama $ | 6 | – | 0 | – | 0 | 12 | – | 0 | – | 0 |
| Georgia | 5 | – | 1 | – | 0 | 6 | – | 5 | – | 0 |
| No. 16 Auburn | 4 | – | 2 | – | 0 | 8 | – | 3 | – | 0 |
| LSU | 4 | – | 2 | – | 0 | 7 | – | 5 | – | 0 |
| Tennessee | 3 | – | 3 | – | 0 | 7 | – | 5 | – | 0 |
| Kentucky | 3 | – | 3 | – | 0 | 5 | – | 6 | – | 0 |
| Ole Miss | 3 | – | 3 | – | 0 | 4 | – | 7 | – | 0 |
| Mississippi State | 2 | – | 4 | – | 0 | 3 | – | 8 | – | 0 |
| Vanderbilt | 0 | – | 6 | – | 0 | 1 | – | 10 | – | 0 |
| Florida | 0 | – | 6 | – | 0 | 0 | – | 10 | – | 1 |
$ – Conference champion; Rankings from AP Poll

The 1979 Vanderbilt Commodores football team represented Vanderbilt University in the 1979 NCAA Division I-A football season. The Commodores were led by head coach George MacIntyre in his first season and finished the season with a record of one win and ten losses (1–10 overall, 0–6 in the SEC).

== Schedule ==
| Date | Opponent | Site | Result | Attendance | Source |
|---|---|---|---|---|---|
| September 15 | at Indiana* | Memorial Stadium; Bloomington, IN | L 13–44 | 30,685 | |
| September 22 | The Citadel* | Dudley Field; Nashville, TN | L 14–27 | 26,500 | |
| September 29 | No. 2 Alabama | Dudley Field; Nashville, TN | L 3–66 | 34,694 | |
| October 6 | at Tulane* | Louisiana Superdome; New Orleans, LA | L 14–42 | 27,873 | |
| October 13 | at No. 18 Auburn | Jordan-Hare Stadium; Auburn, AL | L 35–52 | 45,615 | |
| October 20 | Georgia | Dudley Field; Nashville, TN (rivalry) | L 10–31 | 24,700 | |
| October 27 | at Ole Miss | Hemingway Stadium; Oxford, MS (rivalry) | L 28–63 | 35,667 | |
| November 3 | Memphis State* | Dudley Field; Nashville, TN | W 13–3 | 28,900 | |
| November 10 | Kentucky | Dudley Field; Nashville, TN (rivalry) | L 10–29 | 33,250 | |
| November 17 | at Air Force* | Falcon Stadium; Colorado Springs, CO | L 29–30 | 15,619 | |
| December 1 | at Tennessee | Neyland Stadium; Knoxville, TN (rivalry) | L 10–31 | 84,142 | |
*Non-conference game; Rankings from AP Poll released prior to the game

== Roster ==
1979 Vanderbilt Commodores football team roster
Players
Coaches
Offense

| Pos. | # | Name | Class |
|---|---|---|---|
| WR | 32 | Preston Brown | Sr |
| QB | 11 | Rob Vaughn | So |
| QB | 7 | Van Heflin | Jr |
| RB | | Frank Mordica |
| RB | | Terry Potter |
| TE | | Flavious Smith |
| QB | 10 | Whit Taylor | Fr |

Defense

| Pos. | # | Name | Class |
|---|---|---|---|
| LB | | Lyle Kilpatrick | Jr |
| DB | | Ronnie Myrick | Sr |

Special teams

| Pos. | # | Name | Class |
|---|---|---|---|
| K | | Mike Woodard |

Head coach

- George MacIntyre

Coordinators/assistant coaches

Legend

- (C) Team captain
- (S) Suspended
- (I) Ineligible
- Injured
- Redshirt
