= 1979 Auburn Tigers football team =

American college football season

1979 Auburn Tigers football
- Conference: Southeastern Conference

Ranking
- AP: No. 16
- Record: 8–3 (4–2 SEC)
- Head coach: Doug Barfield (4th season)
- Offensive scheme: Veer, I
- Defensive coordinator: P. W. Underwood (4th season)
- Home stadium: Jordan-Hare Stadium

1979 Southeastern Conference football standings
	Conf.					Overall
Team	W		L		T	W		L		T
No. 1 Alabama $	6	–	0	–	0	12	–	0	–	0
Georgia	5	–	1	–	0	6	–	5	–	0
No. 16 Auburn	4	–	2	–	0	8	–	3	–	0
LSU	4	–	2	–	0	7	–	5	–	0
Tennessee	3	–	3	–	0	7	–	5	–	0
Kentucky	3	–	3	–	0	5	–	6	–	0
Ole Miss	3	–	3	–	0	4	–	7	–	0
Mississippi State	2	–	4	–	0	3	–	8	–	0
Vanderbilt	0	–	6	–	0	1	–	10	–	0
Florida	0	–	6	–	0	0	–	10	–	1
$ – Conference champion; Rankings from AP Poll

The 1979 Auburn Tigers football team achieved an overall record of 8–3 under head coach Doug Barfield, which would be his best season as head coach. The Tigers went 4–2 in the SEC. They finished the season ranked #16 in the AP poll, but were not ranked in the UPI due to probation.

Prior to the start of the season, on May 11, Auburn was placed on probation by the NCAA as a result of an investigation into violations dating back to 1974.

Five players were named to the All-SEC first team for 1979: running back James Brooks, running back Joe Cribbs, linebacker Freddy Smith, defensive tackle Frank Warren, and offensive tackle George Stephenson. Joe Cribbs was also named the SEC Most Valuable Player for that year.

During the 1979 season, the offense used a combination of the veer and I formations and both Joe Cribbs and James Brooks gained over 1,000 yards rushing.

== Schedule ==
Date	Opponent	Rank	Site	Result	Attendance	Source
September 15	Kansas State*		Jordan-Hare Stadium; Auburn, AL	W 26–18	50,132	
September 22	Southern Miss*		Jordan-Hare Stadium; Auburn, AL	W 31–9	45,226	
September 29	at Tennessee		Neyland Stadium; Knoxville, TN (rivalry)	L 17–35	85,936	
October 6	No. 14 NC State*		Jordan-Hare Stadium; Auburn, AL	W 44–31	51,146	
October 13	Vanderbilt	No. 18	Jordan-Hare Stadium; Auburn, AL	W 52–35	45,615	
October 20	at Georgia Tech*	No. 14	Grant Field; Atlanta, GA (rivalry)	W 38–14	54,236	
October 27	at No. 18 Wake Forest*	No. 13	Groves Stadium; Winston-Salem, NC	L 38–42	34,060	
November 3	Florida	No. 20	Jordan-Hare Stadium; Auburn, AL (rivalry)	W 19–13	58,754	
November 10	Mississippi State^{†}	No. 16	Jordan-Hare Stadium; Auburn, AL	W 14–3	59,136	
November 17	at Georgia	No. 15	Sanford Stadium; Athens, GA (rivalry)	W 33–13	63,000	
December 1	vs. No. 1 Alabama	No. 14	Legion Field; Birmingham, AL (Iron Bowl)	L 18–25	77,918	
*Non-conference game; ^{†}Homecoming; Rankings from AP Poll released prior to the game

== Roster ==
1979 Auburn Tigers football team roster
Players
Coaches
Offense

Pos.	#	Name	Class
QB	5	Joe Sullivan	Fr
RB	20	Joe Cribbs	Sr
RB	21	James Brooks	Jr
OT	72	Jeff Smith	Fr
OT	78	Keith Uecker	So
WR	82	Byron Franklin	Jr

Defense

Pos.	#	Name	Class
DT	66	Frank Warren	Jr
DE	99	Edmund Nelson	So

Special teams

Pos.	#	Name	Class

Head coach

- Doug Barfield

Coordinators/assistant coaches

- Joe Hollis
  (Offensive line)

Legend

- (C) Team captain
- (S) Suspended
- (I) Ineligible
- Injured
- Redshirt

Roster
