= 1979 Mississippi State Bulldogs football team =

American college football season

1979 Mississippi State Bulldogs football
- Conference: Southeastern Conference
- Record: 3–8 (2–4 SEC)
- Head coach: Emory Bellard (1st season)
- Defensive coordinator: Melvin Robertson (1st season)
- Home stadium: Scott Field; Mississippi Veterans Memorial Stadium

1979 Southeastern Conference football standings
	Conf.					Overall
Team	W		L		T	W		L		T
No. 1 Alabama $	6	–	0	–	0	12	–	0	–	0
Georgia	5	–	1	–	0	6	–	5	–	0
No. 16 Auburn	4	–	2	–	0	8	–	3	–	0
LSU	4	–	2	–	0	7	–	5	–	0
Tennessee	3	–	3	–	0	7	–	5	–	0
Kentucky	3	–	3	–	0	5	–	6	–	0
Ole Miss	3	–	3	–	0	4	–	7	–	0
Mississippi State	2	–	4	–	0	3	–	8	–	0
Vanderbilt	0	–	6	–	0	1	–	10	–	0
Florida	0	–	6	–	0	0	–	10	–	1
$ – Conference champion; Rankings from AP Poll

The 1979 Mississippi State Bulldogs football team represented Mississippi State University as a member of the Southeastern Conference (SEC) during the 1979 NCAA Division I-A football season. Led by first-year head coach Emory Bellard, the Bulldogs compiled an overall record of 3–8, with a mark of 2–4 in conference play, and finished eighth in the SEC.

This was the first season at Mississippi State for head coach Emory Bellard, the creator of the wishbone offense.

== Schedule ==
Date	Opponent	Site	Result	Attendance	Source
September 8	Memphis State*	Mississippi Veterans Memorial Stadium; Jackson, MS	L 13–14	43,500	
September 22	at Maryland*	Byrd Stadium; College Park, MD	L 14–35	37,212	
September 29	Florida	Mississippi Veterans Memorial Stadium; Jackson, MS	W 24–10	38,000	
October 6	vs. No. 19 Tennessee	Liberty Bowl Memorial Stadium; Memphis, TN	W 28–9	48,820	
October 13	at No. 9 Florida State*	Doak Campbell Stadium; Tallahassee, FL	L 6–17	48,701	
October 20	Marshall*	Scott Field; Starkville, MS	W 48–0	25,500	
October 27	Southern Miss*	Scott Field; Starkville, MS	L 7–21	35,500	
November 3	at No. 1 Alabama	Bryant–Denny Stadium; Tuscaloosa, AL (rivalry)	L 7–24	60,210	
November 10	at No. 16 Auburn	Jordan-Hare Stadium; Auburn, AL	L 3–14	59,136	
November 17	at LSU	Tiger Stadium; Baton Rouge, LA (rivalry)	L 3–21	69,454	
November 24	vs. Ole Miss	Mississippi Veterans Memorial Stadium; Jackson, MS (Egg Bowl)	L 9–14	46,021	
*Non-conference game; Rankings from AP Poll released prior to the game

== Roster ==
1979 Mississippi State Bulldogs football team roster
Players
Coaches
Offense

Pos.	#	Name	Class
C	58	Kent Hull
RB	22	James Jones
WR	88	Mardye McDole

Defense

Pos.	#	Name	Class
DE	79	Glen Collins
FS	37	Kenny Johnson
DT	98	Tyrone Keys

Special teams

Pos.	#	Name	Class
K, P		Dana Moore	Fr

Head coach

- Emory Bellard

Coordinators/assistant coaches

Legend

- (C) Team captain
- (S) Suspended
- (I) Ineligible
- Injured
- Redshirt
