= 1979 Alabama Crimson Tide football team =

American college football season

1979 Alabama Crimson Tide football

Consensus national champion SEC champion Sugar Bowl champion

Sugar Bowl, W 24–9 vs. Arkansas
- Conference: Southeastern Conference

Ranking
- Coaches: No. 1
- AP: No. 1
- Record: 12–0 (6–0 SEC)
- Head coach: Bear Bryant (22nd season)
- Offensive coordinator: Mal Moore (5th season)
- Offensive scheme: Wishbone
- Defensive coordinator: Ken Donahue (6th season)
- Base defense: 5–2
- Captains: Don McNeal; Steve Whitman
- Home stadium: Bryant–Denny Stadium; Legion Field

1979 Southeastern Conference football standings
	Conf.					Overall
Team	W		L		T	W		L		T
No. 1 Alabama $	6	–	0	–	0	12	–	0	–	0
Georgia	5	–	1	–	0	6	–	5	–	0
No. 16 Auburn	4	–	2	–	0	8	–	3	–	0
LSU	4	–	2	–	0	7	–	5	–	0
Tennessee	3	–	3	–	0	7	–	5	–	0
Kentucky	3	–	3	–	0	5	–	6	–	0
Ole Miss	3	–	3	–	0	4	–	7	–	0
Mississippi State	2	–	4	–	0	3	–	8	–	0
Vanderbilt	0	–	6	–	0	1	–	10	–	0
Florida	0	–	6	–	0	0	–	10	–	1
$ – Conference champion; Rankings from AP Poll

The 1979 Alabama Crimson Tide football team (variously "Alabama", "UA" or "Bama") represented the University of Alabama in the 1979 NCAA Division I-A football season. It was the Crimson Tide's 85th overall and 46th season as a member of the Southeastern Conference (SEC). The team was led by head coach Bear Bryant, in his 22nd year, and played their home games at Bryant–Denny Stadium in Tuscaloosa and Legion Field in Birmingham, Alabama. They finished the season undefeated (12–0 overall, 6–0 in the SEC) and with a victory over Arkansas in the Sugar Bowl. For their collective efforts, the Crimson Tide were recognized as unanimous national champions for the 1979 season.

In 1979 the Alabama Crimson Tide capped off a decade of success with the program's seventh perfect season in college history after 1925, 1930, 1934, 1945, 1961, and 1966 (discounting the 1897 "season" in which Bama played and won only one game). The Tide defense recorded five shutouts and allowed only two teams to score in double digits. The offense scored thirty points or more seven times.

Despite this dominance Alabama had three close calls. Against Tennessee on October 20, Alabama fell behind 17–0 in the second quarter before rallying to win 27–17. Three weeks later, against LSU, all the Tide offense could scrape up was a single field goal, but it was enough to win 3–0. In the regular season finale against Auburn, after leading 14–3 at the half Alabama let Auburn take an 18–17 fourth quarter lead before winning 25–18. The Auburn and Tennessee games were the only two times in the 1979 season that Alabama trailed. A 24–9 victory over Arkansas capped a 12–0 season and national championship, Alabama's sixth wire service national title.

== Schedule ==
Date	Opponent	Rank	Site	TV	Result	Attendance	Source
September 8	at Georgia Tech*	No. 2	Grant Field; Atlanta, GA (rivalry)	ABC	W 30–6	57,621	
September 22	Baylor*	No. 2	Legion Field; Birmingham, AL		W 45–0	77,512	
September 29	at Vanderbilt	No. 2	Dudley Field; Nashville, TN		W 66–3	34,694	
October 6	Wichita State*	No. 2	Bryant–Denny Stadium; Tuscaloosa, AL		W 38–0	51,000	
October 13	at Florida	No. 2	Florida Field; Gainesville, FL (rivalry)		W 40–0	64,552	
October 20	No. 18 Tennessee	No. 1	Legion Field; Birmingham, AL (Third Saturday in October)	ESPN	W 27–17	77,665	
October 27	Virginia Tech*^{†}	No. 1	Bryant–Denny Stadium; Tuscaloosa, AL		W 31–7	60,210	
November 3	Mississippi State	No. 1	Bryant–Denny Stadium; Tuscaloosa, AL (rivalry)		W 24–7	60,210	
November 10	at LSU	No. 1	Tiger Stadium; Baton Rouge, LA (rivalry)		W 3–0	73,708	
November 17	Miami (FL)*	No. 1	Bryant–Denny Stadium; Tuscaloosa, AL	ABC	W 30–0	54,500	
December 1	vs. No. 14 Auburn	No. 1	Legion Field; Birmingham, AL (Iron Bowl)		W 25–18	77,918	
January 1, 1980	vs. No. 6 Arkansas*	No. 2	Louisiana Superdome; New Orleans, LA (Sugar Bowl)	ABC	W 24–9	77,846	
*Non-conference game; ^{†}Homecoming; Rankings from AP Poll released prior to the game; Source:

== Game summaries ==
=== At Georgia Tech ===
Team	1	2	3	4	Total
• #2 Alabama	6	6	15	3	30
Georgia Tech	0	0	0	6	6

- Date: September 8
- Location: Grant Field
  Atlanta, Georgia
- Game attendance: 57,621
- TV announcers (ABC): Keith Jackson & Ara Parseghian

Scoring summary
1	1:22	Alabama	E. J. Junior 59-yard interception return (Alan McElroy kick failed)	Alabama 6–0
2	4:12	Alabama	Major Ogilvie 1-yard run (Two-point run failed)	Alabama 12–0
3	11:55	Alabama	Steve Whitman 13-yard run (Alan McElroy kick)	Alabama 19–0
3	5:12	Alabama	Steadman S. Shealy 11-yard run (Two-point run)	Alabama 27–0
4	2:01	Alabama	Alan McElroy 31-yard field goal	Alabama 30–0
4	0:12	Georgia Tech	Leon Chadwick 36-yard pass from Mike Kelley (Two-point pass failed)	Alabama 30–6

As they entered the 1979 season, Alabama was ranked as the No. 2 team in the first AP Poll prior to their season opener against Georgia Tech. Playing before a nationally televised audience, the Crimson Tide rushed for over 300 yards in this 30–6 victory over the Yellow Jackets. Alabama took a 6–0 lead in the first quarter after E. J. Junior intercepted a Mike Kelley pass and returned it 59-yards for a touchdown. Major Ogilvie then extended their lead to 12–0 with his one-yard touchdown run late in the second quarter.

The Crimson Tide took control of the game with a pair of third quarter touchdowns that extended their lead to 27–0. Steve Whitman scored first on a thirteen-yard run and this was followed by an eleven-yard Steadman S. Shealy touchdown run. After a late Gary DeNiro interception set up a 31-yard Alan McElroy field goal, Georgia Tech scored on a 36-yard Kelley touchdown pass to Leon Chadwick that made the final score 30–6 and prevented a shutout. The victory improved Alabama's all-time record against Georgia Tech to 25–19–3.

=== Baylor ===
Team	1	2	3	4	Total
Baylor	0	0	0	0	0
• #2 Alabama	6	8	3	28	45

- Date: September 22
- Location: Legion Field
  Birmingham, Alabama
- Game attendance: 77,512

Scoring summary
1	10:13	Alabama	Alan McElroy 30-yard field goal	Alabama 3–0
1	0:00	Alabama	Alan McElroy 25-yard field goal	Alabama 6–0
2	10:53	Alabama	Major Ogilvie 1-yard run (Two-point run)	Alabama 14–0
3	5:50	Alabama	Alan McElroy 33-yard field goal	Alabama 17–0
4	14:55	Alabama	Mark Nix 2-yard run (Alan McElroy kick)	Alabama 24–0
4	11:58	Alabama	Mark Nix 8-yard run (Alan McElroy kick)	Alabama 31–0
4	4:43	Alabama	Joe Jones 1-yard run (Alan McElroy kick)	Alabama 38–0
4	0:22	Alabama	John Hill 10-yard run (Alan McElroy kick)	Alabama 45–0

Coming off their bye week, Alabama was still ranked as the No. 2 team in the AP Poll prior to their home opener against Baylor. Playing at Legion Field, the Crimson Tide shutout the Bears of the Southwest Conference 45–0 in what was the first all-time meeting between the schools. After taking a 6–0 lead on a pair of Alan McElroy field goals, Alabama led 14–0 at halftime after Major Ogilvie scored on a one-yard touchdown run in the second quarter. A 33-yard McElroy field goal in the third brought the Crimson Tide lead to 17–0 before Alabama scored four touchdowns in the fourth quarter and made the final score 45–0. Mark Nix scored the first pair on runs of two and eight-yards, followed by a one-yard Joe Jones run. John Hill scored the final points with his ten-yard touchdown run in the final minute of the game.

=== At Vanderbilt ===
Team	1	2	3	4	Total
• #2 Alabama	14	18	13	21	66
Vanderbilt	0	3	0	0	3

- Date: September 29
- Location: Dudley Field
  Nashville, Tennessee
- Game attendance: 34,694

Scoring summary
1	Alabama	Steadman S. Shealy 65-yard run (Alan McElroy kick)	Alabama 7–0
1	Alabama	Major Ogilvie 8-yard run (Two-point run)	Alabama 14–0
2	Vanderbilt	Mike Woodard 47-yard field goal	Alabama 14–3
2	Alabama	Steadman S. Shealy 19-yard run (Two-point pass)	Alabama 22–3
2	Alabama	Alan McElroy 21-yard field goal	Alabama 25–3
2	Alabama	Mark Nix 1-yard run (Alan McElroy kick)	Alabama 32–3
3	Alabama	Steve Whitman 3-yard run (Alan McElroy kick failed)	Alabama 38–3
3	Alabama	Joe Jones 1-yard run (Alan McElroy kick)	Alabama 45–3
4	Alabama	Joe Jones 3-yard run (Tim Clark kick)	Alabama 52–3
4	Alabama	Michael Landrum 3-yard run (Amos Jones kick)	Alabama 59–3
4	Alabama	John Hill 14-yard run (Amos Jones kick)	Alabama 66–3

After their victory over Baylor, Alabama was still ranked as the No. 2 team in the AP Poll prior to their game against Vanderbilt. Playing at Nashville, the Crimson Tide defeated the Commodores by a blowout score of 66–3 in the conference opener. The Crimson Tide took a 14–0 first quarter lead behind touchdown runs of 65 and eight-yards by Steadman S. Shealy and Major Ogilvie. After Mike Woodard scored the only Vandy points with his 47-yard field goal, Alabama extended their lead to 32–3 at the half after Alan McElroy connected on a 21-yard field goal and touchdowns were scored on runs of 19 and one-yard by Shealy and Mark Nix.

The Crimson Tide continued their strong play into the second half as they scored five touchdowns and kept the Commodores scoreless on defense. Touchdowns were scored in the third on runs of three and one-yards by Steve Whitman and Joe Jones and in the fourth on a pair of three and a 14-yard run by Jones, Michael Landrum and John Hill. The victory improved Alabama's all-time record against Vanderbilt to 36–17–4.

=== Wichita State ===
Team	1	2	3	4	Total
Wichita State	0	0	0	0	0
• #2 Alabama	14	14	7	3	38

- Date: October 6
- Location: Bryant–Denny Stadium
  Tuscaloosa, Alabama
- Game attendance: 55,068

Scoring summary
1	Alabama	Keith Pugh 27-yard pass from Steadman S. Shealy (Alan McElroy kick)	Alabama 7–0
1	Alabama	Steadman S. Shealy 3-yard run (Alan McElroy kick)	Alabama 14–0
2	Alabama	Major Ogilvie 6-yard run (Alan McElroy kick)	Alabama 21–0
2	Alabama	Major Ogilvie 4-yard run (Alan McElroy kick)	Alabama 28–0
3	Alabama	Steadman S. Shealy 8-yard run (Jones kick)	Alabama 35–0
4	Alabama	Alan McElroy 40-yard field goal	Alabama 38–0

As they prepared for their first Tuscaloosa game of the season, Alabama retained their No. 2 position in AP Poll prior to their game against Wichita State. In what was the only game ever played against the Shockers, the Crimson Tide won with this 38–0 shutout at Bryant–Denny Stadium. Alabama took a 28–0 lead into halftime behind a pair of touchdowns scored in each of the first two quarters. After Steadman S. Shealy connected with Keith Pugh on a 27-yard touchdown pass, Shealy scored on a three-yard run for a 14–0 first quarter lead. Major Ogilvie then gave the Crimson Tide a 28–0 halftime lead after he scored on touchdown runs of six and four-yards in the second. Alabama closed the game with an eight-yard Shealy touchdown run in the third and a 40-yard Alan McElroy field goal in the fourth that made the final score 38–0.

=== At Florida ===
Team	1	2	3	4	Total
• Alabama	14	3	13	10	40
Florida	0	0	0	0	0

- Date: October 13
- Location: Florida Field
- Game attendance: 64,552

Scoring summary
Q1	ALA	Shealy 3 yard run (McElroy kick)	ALA 7–0
Q1	ALA	Whitman 5 yard run (McElroy kick)	ALA 14–0
Q2	ALA	McElroy 31 yard field goal	ALA 17–0
Q3	ALA	Jacobs 73 yard run (kick failed)	ALA 23–0
Q3	ALA	Oglivie 1 yard run (McElroy kick)	ALA 30–0
Q4	ALA	Hill 2 yard run (McElroy kick)	ALA 37–0
Q4	ALA	McElroy 34 yard field goal	ALA 40–0

=== At LSU ===
The 3-0 final was deceiving. LSU never penetrated past the Alabama 42-yard line and mustered only 164 yards against the rugged Crimson Tide defense. Alan McElroy's 27-yard field goal in the third quarter provided the scoring.

=== Miami (FL) ===
Miami (FL) Hurricanes (4–4) at #1 Alabama Crimson Tide (9–0)

Quarter	1	2	3	4	Total
Miami (FL)	0	0	0	0	0
Alabama	10	0	7	13	30

at Bryant-Denny Stadium, Tuscaloosa, Alabama

- Date: November 17
- Game attendance: 54,500
- TV announcers (ABC): Al Michaels & Frank Broyles

Game information

First quarter

- ALA – Tim Travis 56-yard pass from Steadman Shealy (Alan McElroy kick). Alabama 7–0.
- ALA – Alan McElroy 24-yard field goal. Alabama 10–0.

Second quarter

- No scoring

Third quarter

- ALA – Major Ogilvie 1-yard run (Alan McElroy kick). Alabama 17–0.

Fourth quarter

- ALA – Alan McElroy 25-yard field goal. Alabama 20–0.
- ALA – Alan McElroy 23-yard field goal. Alabama 23–0.
- ALA – James Haney 5-yard run (Alan McElroy kick). Alabama 30–0.

The contest versus the Hurricanes marked the first national television broadcast from Bryant–Denny Stadium. Portable light standards had to be brought in by ABC, since the Tuscaloosa stadium lacked permanent fixtures at the time. It also marked the Alabama homecoming for former Crimson Tide assistant Howard Schnellenberger, in his first season at Miami.

=== Vs. Auburn ===
#1 Alabama vs. #14 Auburn

Team	1	2	3	4	Total
• Alabama	0	14	3	8	25
Auburn	3	0	9	6	18

- Date: December 1
- Location: Legion Field, Birmingham, Alabama
- Game attendance: 77,918

Scoring summary

Quarter	Time	Drive			Team	Scoring information	Score	
Quarter	Time	Plays	Yards	TOP	Team	Scoring information	ALA	AUB
1					Auburn	Portela 47-yard field goal	0	3
2					Alabama	Pugh 28-yard pass from Shealy (McElroy kick)	7	3
2					Alabama	Shealy 1-yard run (McElroy kick)	14	3
3					Auburn	Portela 39-yard field goal	14	6
3					Alabama	McElroy 28-yard field goal	17	6
3					Auburn	Cribbs 36-yard pass from Trotman (two-point failed)	17	12
4					Auburn	Robbins 11-yard pass from Trotman (two-point failed)	17	18
4					Alabama	Shealy 8-yard run (Shealy run)	25	18
"TOP" = time of possession. For other American football terms, see Glossary of American football.							25	18

== Roster ==
1979 Alabama Crimson Tide football team roster
Players
Coaches
Offense

Pos.	#	Name	Class
G	62	Scott Allison	Jr
OT	78	Buddy Aydelette	Sr
OT	53	Wiley Barnes	Sr
OT	76	Thomas Boler	Jr
SE	86	David Booker	Jr
G	60	Vince Boothe	Sr
G		Gary Bramblett	RFr
G	70	Mike Brock	Sr
TE	83	Laurence Brown III	Sr
OT	63	Jim Bunch	Sr
TE	71	Bob Cayavec	RFr
SE	80	Tim Clark	So
G	67	Vince Cowell	Jr
C	59	Bob Dasher	RFr
RB		John Dyess	So
OT	79	Rusty Faust	So
RB	41	Mitch Ferguson	Jr
QB		Pat Folmar	Jr
G		Bill Glass	So
QB-RB	14	Alan Gray	So
RB	21	James Haney	So
DB	9	Jim Bob Harris	So
FB	44	John Hill	Jr
RB		Tim Hill	So
TE-P	1	Buddy Holt	Sr
RB	33	Billy Jackson	Jr
RB		Amos Jones	So
RB	24	Joe Jones	Jr
FB		Bobby Johnson	So
FB		Mike Kennedy	So
TE	87	Bart Krout	So
SE	26	James Mallard	Jr
SE	82	Keith Marks	RFr
OT	72	Eddie McCombs	Jr
OT		Denny Merritt	RFr
OT		Jeff Miller	RFr
OT		Farrar Montgomery	Jr
SE	25	Clay Moss	Fr
RB-DB	48	Mark Nix	So
RB	42	Major Ogilvie	Jr
RB-DB	29	Ben Orcutt	So
RB		Doug Prater	Jr
SE	4	Keith Pugh	Sr
QB		Steve Rhoden	So
C	61	Joe Robbins	Jr
SE		Frank Sazera	Jr
G	69	Bill Searcey	Jr
QB	10	Steadman S. Shealy	Sr
SE		David Sherrill	So
C	52	Barry Smith	Sr
OT		Marvin Smith	So
C	57	Dwight Stephenson	Sr
TE	88	Tim Travis	Sr
FB	45	Steve Whitman	Sr
FB	38	Charlie Williams	RFr

Defense

Pos.	#	Name	Class
DT	70	Joe Beazley	RFr
LB	90	Tom Boyd	So
DT	47	Byron Braggs	Jr
DB		Bill Brown	So
DT		Danny Casteel	RFr
DB	43	Mike Clements	Jr
DT	98	Jackie Cline	RFr
DB		Prince Colley	So
DT		Allen Connell	Jr
DE	51	Gary DeNiro	Jr
DB		Marvis Freeman	Jr
DE		Robert Gaines	Fr
LB		Steve Glass	Fr
DE	94	Wayne Hamilton	Sr
DT	74	David Hannah	Sr
DE		Butch Harkness	Jr
DB	37	Greg Haynes	RFr
DB		Josh Henderson	RFr
DT	93	Scott Homan	RFr
LB		James Hughes	So
DT	95	Mike Inman	Jr
DB, QB	5	Don Jacobs	Jr
LB	97	Robbie Jones	RFr
DE	39	E. J. Junior	Jr
DE		John Lancaster	Jr
DB		Greg Landers	Fr
DB	57	Eddie Lowe	So
NG	91	Warren Lyles	So
DB		Bobby Marks	RSo
DE	84	John Mauro	Jr
LB		David McCarty	So
DT	96	Curtis McGriff	Sr
DB	28	Don McNeal	Sr
DB	23	Benny Perrin	So
DE	81	Mike Pitts	RFr
DB	16	David Reeves	So
DB		Bill Robinson	So
DB		David Rogers	So
LB	36	Ricky Rozzell	RFr
DE		Roy Rumbley	So
LB	50	Randy Scott	Jr
NG	99	Richard Shinn	So
DB	49	Bobby Smith	Sr
DB		Peter Smith	Jr
DB	27	Tom Spencer	Jr
DB	7	Jerrill Sprinkle	RFr
DE	99	John Theis	So
DB	18	Ricky Tucker	Jr
DB	15	Tommy Wilcox	RFr

Special teams

Pos.	#	Name	Class
PK		Johnny Brooker	So
P		Butch Bunn	Jr
PK		George Mardini	So
PK	6	Alan McElroy	Sr
P	2	Woody Umphrey	Jr

Head coach

- Bear Bryant

Coordinators/assistant coaches

- Mal Moore (Offensive coordinator / quarterbacks)
- Ken Donahue (Defensive coordinator)
- Sylvester Croom (Inside linebackers)
- K. J. Lazenby
- Bobby Marks
- Bill Oliver (Defensive backs)
- Bryant Pool
- Dee Powell
- Jeff Rouzie
- Jack Rutledge
- George "Shorty" White
- Perry Willis

Legend

- (C) Team captain
- (S) Suspended
- (I) Ineligible
- Injured
- Redshirt

Roster
Last update: October 15, 2013
