= 1979 Georgia Bulldogs football team =

American college football season

1979 Georgia Bulldogs football
- Conference: Southeastern Conference
- Record: 6–5 (5–1 SEC)
- Head coach: Vince Dooley (16th season)
- Defensive coordinator: Erk Russell (16th season)
- Base defense: 4–4
- Home stadium: Sanford Stadium

1979 Southeastern Conference football standings
	Conf.					Overall
Team	W		L		T	W		L		T
No. 1 Alabama $	6	–	0	–	0	12	–	0	–	0
Georgia	5	–	1	–	0	6	–	5	–	0
No. 16 Auburn	4	–	2	–	0	8	–	3	–	0
LSU	4	–	2	–	0	7	–	5	–	0
Tennessee	3	–	3	–	0	7	–	5	–	0
Kentucky	3	–	3	–	0	5	–	6	–	0
Ole Miss	3	–	3	–	0	4	–	7	–	0
Mississippi State	2	–	4	–	0	3	–	8	–	0
Vanderbilt	0	–	6	–	0	1	–	10	–	0
Florida	0	–	6	–	0	0	–	10	–	1
$ – Conference champion; Rankings from AP Poll

The 1979 Georgia Bulldogs football team represented the University of Georgia as a member of the Southeastern Conference (SEC) during the 1979 NCAA Division I-A football season. Led by 16th-year head coach Vince Dooley, the Bulldogs compiled an overall record of 6–5, with a mark of 5–1 in conference play, and finished second in the SEC.

The Bulldogs would have earned the SEC's automatic berth in the Sugar Bowl had Auburn defeated Alabama in the Iron Bowl despite Georgia's 6-5 overall record. An Auburn win would have created a three-way tie between the Bulldogs, Tigers and Crimson Tide for the conference championship, which meant the team which had gone the longest without appearing in the Sugar Bowl would go to New Orleans. Auburn had not been to the Sugar Bowl since after the 1971 season, compared to 1976 for Georgia and 1978 for Alabama, but since the Tigers were banned from bowl games due to NCAA probation, the Bulldogs would have received the nod in that situation. Alabama defeated Auburn 25-18 to win the SEC outright, then toppled Arkansas 24-9 in the Sugar Bowl for the consensus national championship.

== Schedule ==
Date	Opponent	Rank	Site	TV	Result	Attendance	Source
September 15	Wake Forest*	No. 12	Sanford Stadium; Athens, GA		L 21–22	57,500	
September 22	at Clemson*		Memorial Stadium; Clemson, SC (rivalry)		L 7–12	63,573	
September 29	South Carolina*		Sanford Stadium; Athens, GA (rivalry)		L 20–27	60,100	
October 6	at Ole Miss		Hemingway Stadium; Oxford, MS		W 24–21	35,912	
October 13	No. 13 LSU		Sanford Stadium; Athens, GA		W 21–14	61,000	
October 20	at Vanderbilt		Dudley Field; Nashville, TN (rivalry)		W 31–10	24,700	
October 27	Kentucky		Sanford Stadium; Athens, GA		W 20–6	60,300	
November 3	Virginia*^{†}		Sanford Stadium; Athens, GA		L 0–31	59,100	
November 10	vs. Florida		Gator Bowl Stadium; Jacksonville, FL (rivalry)	ABC	W 33–10	68,148	
November 17	Auburn		Sanford Stadium; Athens, GA (rivalry)		L 13–33	63,000	
November 24	Georgia Tech*		Grant Field; Atlanta, GA (rivalry)	ABC	W 16–3	48,781	
*Non-conference game; ^{†}Homecoming; Rankings from AP Poll released prior to the game

== Roster ==
1979 Georgia Bulldogs football team roster
Players
Coaches
Offense

Pos.	#	Name	Class
WR	82	Anthony Arnold
QB	8	Buck Belue	So
TE	88	Norris Brown	Fr
C	53	Ray Donaldson	Sr
RB		Carnie Norris
WR		Carmon Prince
WR	24	Lindsay Scott	So
RB	11	Matt Simon

Defense

Pos.	#	Name	Class
S	49	Jeff Hipp
DL		Jimmy Payne
DB	19	Scott Woerner	Jr

Special teams

Pos.	#	Name	Class
K	6	Rex Robinson	Jr
P		Mike Garrett	Sr

Head coach

- Vince Dooley

Coordinators/assistant coaches

- Erk Russell

Legend

- (C) Team captain
- (S) Suspended
- (I) Ineligible
- Injured
- Redshirt
