= 1979 Kentucky Wildcats football team =

American college football season

1979 Kentucky Wildcats football
- Conference: Southeastern Conference
- Record: 5–6 (3–3 SEC)
- Head coach: Fran Curci (7th season)
- Offensive coordinator: Jon Mirilovich (5th season)
- Defensive coordinator: Charlie Bailey (5th season)
- Home stadium: Commonwealth Stadium

1979 Southeastern Conference football standings
| | Conf. | | | | | Overall |
| Team | W | | L | | T | W | | L | | T |
|---|---|---|---|---|---|---|---|---|---|---|
| No. 1 Alabama $ | 6 | – | 0 | – | 0 | 12 | – | 0 | – | 0 |
| Georgia | 5 | – | 1 | – | 0 | 6 | – | 5 | – | 0 |
| No. 16 Auburn | 4 | – | 2 | – | 0 | 8 | – | 3 | – | 0 |
| LSU | 4 | – | 2 | – | 0 | 7 | – | 5 | – | 0 |
| Tennessee | 3 | – | 3 | – | 0 | 7 | – | 5 | – | 0 |
| Kentucky | 3 | – | 3 | – | 0 | 5 | – | 6 | – | 0 |
| Ole Miss | 3 | – | 3 | – | 0 | 4 | – | 7 | – | 0 |
| Mississippi State | 2 | – | 4 | – | 0 | 3 | – | 8 | – | 0 |
| Vanderbilt | 0 | – | 6 | – | 0 | 1 | – | 10 | – | 0 |
| Florida | 0 | – | 6 | – | 0 | 0 | – | 10 | – | 1 |
$ – Conference champion; Rankings from AP Poll

The 1979 Kentucky Wildcats football team represented the University of Kentucky as a member of the Southeastern Conference (SEC) during the 1979 NCAA Division I-A football season. Led by seventh-year head coach Fran Curci, the Wildcats compiled an overall record of 5–6, with a mark of 3–3 in conference play, and finished tied for fifth in the SEC.

== Schedule ==
| Date | Opponent | Site | Result | Attendance | Source |
|---|---|---|---|---|---|
| September 15 | Miami (OH)* | Commonwealth Stadium; Lexington, KY | L 14–15 | 57,800 | |
| September 22 | at Indiana* | Memorial Stadium; Bloomington, IN (rivalry) | L 10–18 | 45,920 | |
| September 29 | Maryland* | Commonwealth Stadium; Lexington, KY | W 14–7 | 57,800 | |
| October 6 | at West Virginia* | Mountaineer Field; Morgantown, WV | L 6–10 | 33,792 | |
| October 13 | Ole Miss | Commonwealth Stadium; Lexington, KY | W 14–3 | 57,825 | |
| October 20 | at LSU | Tiger Stadium; Baton Rouge, LA | L 19–23 | 71,296 | |
| October 27 | at Georgia | Sanford Stadium; Athens, GA | L 6–20 | 60,300 | |
| November 3 | Bowling Green* | Commonwealth Stadium; Lexington, KY | W 20–14 | 57,500 | |
| November 10 | at Vanderbilt | Dudley Field; Nashville, TN (rivalry) | W 29–10 | 33,250 | |
| November 17 | at Florida | Florida Field; Gainesville, FL (rivalry) | W 31–3 | 55,760 | |
| November 24 | Tennessee | Commonwealth Stadium; Lexington, KY (rivalry) | L 17–20 | 57,950 | |
*Non-conference game

== Roster ==
1979 Kentucky Wildcats football team roster
Players
Coaches
Offense

| Pos. | # | Name | Class |
|---|---|---|---|
| WR | 1 | Brian Allen | Fr |
| QB | 7 | Terry Henry | Fr |
| WR | 8 | Felix Wilson | Sr |
| QB | 9 | Mike Shutt | Sr |
| QB-P | 12 | Randy Jenkins | Fr |
| WR | 16 | Juan Portella | So |
| WR | 21 | Rick Pounds | So |
| SE | 22 | Alan Watson | Fr |
| FB | 25 | Pete Venable | Fr |
| RB | 27 | James Lokesak | Jr |
| WR | 28 | Bill Prewitt | Fr |
| FB | 30 | Kent Phillippi | Jr |
| FB | 32 | Rod Francis | Fr |
| RB | 33 | Chris Jones | Fr |
| TB | 39 | Henry Marzan | Fr |
| FB | 40 | Shawn Donigan | So |
| RB | 42 | Robert Pittman | Jr |
| C | 50 | John Maddox | Fr |
| C | 51 | Ken Roark | Jr |
| C | 52 | Richard Adams | Fr |
| G | 56 | Bob Fogle | Fr |
| G | 65 | Steve Hricenak | Jr |
| G | 67 | Brent Edwards | Jr |
| G | 68 | Leon Shadowen | Sr |
| OT | 69 | Dave Bond | So |
| OT | 71 | Fred Ackiss | Fr |
| G | 75 | Tom Kearns | Sr |
| OT | 76 | Steve Williams | So |
| OT | 77 | Gerald Smyth | Fr |
| OT | 79 | Mickey Cochran | Fr |
| SE | 80 | Jim Campbell | So |
| SE | 81 | Doug Vescio | Sr |
| TE | 89 | Frank McDaniels | Fr |
| TE | 91 | Todd Shadowen | Fr |

Defense

| Pos. | # | Name | Class |
|---|---|---|---|
| DB | 4 | Tom Petty | Fr |
| LB | 5 | Chris Poulton | Fr |
| S | 6 | Ritchie Boyd | Sr |
| S | 18 | Andy Molls | Fr |
| DB | 19 | Chris Jacobs | Sr |
| DB | 24 | Larry Carter | Sr |
| DB | 29 | John Bow | Sr |
| DB | 31 | Greg Motley | Jr |
| DB | 35 | Ben Johnson | Fr |
| DB | 37 | Greg Long | So |
| LB | 38 | Joe Freeman | So |
| DB | 44 | Donald Roe | Fr |
| LB | 47 | Robert Byrd | Fr |
| LB | 48 | Carl Marrillia | Sr |
| DE | 53 | Don Fielder | Jr |
| LB | 54 | Lester Boyd | Sr |
| NG | 55 | Chuck Jones | Sr |
| NG | 57 | Effley Brooks | So |
| NG | 58 | Richard Jaffe | Sr |
| LB | 59 | Robb Chaney | Sr |
| LB | 62 | Craig Miller | Fr |
| LB | 66 | Chuck Smith | Jr |
| DT | 72 | Tim Gooch | Jr |
| DT | 83 | James Bowen | Fr |
| DT | 84 | Kevin Kearns | Fr |
| DT | 86 | Luis Lopez | Jr |
| DE | 87 | Jeff Dennis | Fr |
| DE | 88 | Dean Hall | Fr |
| DE | 90 | Steve Correll | So |
| DT | 93 | Andy Ryan | Jr |
| DE | 94 | Dave Lyons | Fr |

Special teams

| Pos. | # | Name | Class |
|---|---|---|---|
| PK | 3 | Tom Griggs | So |
| PK | 17 | Rick Strein | So |

Head coach

- Fran Curci

Coordinators/assistant coaches

- Jon Mirilovich – Offensive coordinator
- Larry Kirksey – Wide receivers/tight ends coach
- Charlie McCullers – Offensive line coach
- Charlie Bailey – Defensive coordinator
- Bill Glaser – Defensive line coach
- George Catavolos – Defensive backs coach

Legend

- (C) Team captain
- (S) Suspended
- (I) Ineligible
- Injured
- Redshirt
