= 1979 Notre Dame Fighting Irish football team =

American college football team season

1979 Notre Dame Fighting Irish football
- Conference: Independent
- Record: 7–4
- Head coach: Dan Devine (5th season)
- Captains: Vagas Ferguson; Tim Foley; Dave Waymer
- Home stadium: Notre Dame Stadium

1979 NCAA Division I-A independents football records
	Conf.					Overall
Team	W		L		T	W		L		T
No. 6 Florida State		–		–		11	–	1	–	0
No. 7 Pittsburgh		–		–		11	–	1	–	0
UNLV		–		–		9	–	1	–	2
No. 17 Temple		–		–		10	–	2	–	0
Tulane		–		–		9	–	3	–	0
Rutgers		–		–		8	–	3	–	0
Tennessee State		–		–		8	–	3	–	0
East Carolina		–		–		7	–	3	–	1
No. 20 Penn State		–		–		8	–	4	–	0
South Carolina		–		–		8	–	4	–	0
Navy		–		–		7	–	4	–	0
Notre Dame		–		–		7	–	4	–	0
Southern Miss		–		–		6	–	4	–	1
Syracuse		–		–		7	–	5	–	0
Colgate		–		–		5	–	4	–	1
Boston College		–		–		5	–	6	–	0
Holy Cross		–		–		5	–	6	–	0
Memphis State		–		–		5	–	6	–	0
Miami (FL)		–		–		5	–	6	–	0
North Texas State		–		–		5	–	6	–	0
Villanova		–		–		5	–	6	–	0
Virginia Tech		–		–		5	–	6	–	0
West Virginia		–		–		5	–	6	–	0
Georgia Tech		–		–		4	–	6	–	1
Louisville		–		–		4	–	6	–	1
William & Mary		–		–		4	–	7	–	0
Illinois State		–		–		3	–	8	–	0
Northeast Louisiana		–		–		3	–	8	–	0
Army		–		–		2	–	8	–	1
Air Force		–		–		2	–	9	–	0
Cincinnati		–		–		2	–	9	–	0
Richmond		–		–		0	–	11	–	0
Rankings from AP Poll

The 1979 Notre Dame Fighting Irish football team was an American football team that represented the University of Notre Dame as an independent during the 1979 NCAA Division I-A football season. In their fifth year under head coach Dan Devine, the Irish compiled a 7–4 record, outscored opponents by a total of 243 to 197, and were unranked in both the AP poll and UPI polls for the first time since 1963.

Running back and team co-captain Vagas Ferguson was a consensus first-team pick on the 1979 All-America college football team. Offensive tackle Tim Foley also received first-team All-America honors from multiple selectors. The team's statistical leaders included quarterback Rusty Lisch (1,781 passing yards), running back Vagas Ferguson (1,437 rushing yards, 102 points scored), and tight end Tony Hunter (27 receptions for 690 yards).

The team played its home games at Notre Dame Stadium in Notre Dame, Indiana.

== Schedule ==
Date	Time	Opponent	Rank	Site	TV	Result	Attendance	Source
September 15	3:20 p.m.	at No. 6 Michigan	No. 9	Michigan Stadium; Ann Arbor, MI (rivalry)	ABC	W 12–10	105,111	
September 22	2:30 p.m.	at No. 17 Purdue	No. 5	Ross–Ade Stadium; West Lafayette, IN (rivalry)		L 22–28	70,567	
September 29	2:30 p.m.	No. 7 Michigan State	No. 15	Notre Dame Stadium; Notre Dame, IN (rivalry)		W 27–3	59,075	
October 6	2:30 p.m.	Georgia Tech	No. 10	Notre Dame Stadium; Notre Dame, IN (rivalry)		W 21–13	59,075	
October 13	3:30 p.m.	at Air Force	No. 10	Falcon Stadium; Colorado Springs, CO (rivalry)		W 38–13	34,881	
October 20	12:50 p.m.	No. 4 USC	No. 9	Notre Dame Stadium; Notre Dame, IN (rivalry)	ABC	L 23–42	59,075	
October 27	2:30 p.m.	South Carolina	No. 14	Notre Dame Stadium; Notre Dame, IN		W 18–17	59,075	
November 3	1:30 p.m.	Navy	No. 13	Notre Dame Stadium; Notre Dame, IN (rivalry)		W 14–0	59,075	
November 10	1:30 p.m.	at Tennessee	No. 13	Neyland Stadium; Knoxville, TN		L 18–40	86,489	
November 17	1:30 p.m.	No. 14 Clemson		Notre Dame Stadium; Notre Dame, IN		L 10–16	59,075	
November 24	11:00 p.m.	vs. Miami (FL)		Japan National Stadium; Tokyo, Japan (Mirage Bowl, rivalry)		W 40–15	62,574	
Rankings from AP Poll released prior to the game; All times are in Eastern time

== Game summaries ==
=== At Michigan ===
Notre Dame Fighting Irish (0–0) at Michigan Wolverines (1–0)

Quarter	1	2	3	4	Total
Notre Dame	3	3	6	0	12
Michigan	3	7	0	0	10

at Michigan Stadium, Ann Arbor, Michigan

- Date: September 15
- Game weather: 65 °F (18 °C)
- Game attendance: 105,111
- TV announcers (ABC): Keith Jackson and Frank Broyles
- Recap

Game information

First quarter

- MICH – Bryan Virgil 30-yard field goal, 7:31. Michigan 3–0. Drive: 10 plays, 84 yards.
- ND – Chuck Male 40-yard field goal. Tie 3–3. Drive:

Second quarter

- MICH – Stan Edwards 1-yard run (Bryan Virgil kick), 10:48. Michigan 10–3. Drive: 13 plays, 80 yards, 6:39.
- ND – Chuck Male 40-yard field goal, 4:48. Michigan 10–6. Drive:

Third quarter

- ND – Chuck Male 22–yard field goal. Michigan 10–9. Drive:
- ND – Chuck Male 39-yard field goal. Notre Dame 12–10. Drive:

Top passers

- ND – Rusty Lisch – 5/10, 65 yards
- MICH – B. J. Dickey – 9/18, 106 yards

Top rushers

- ND – Vagas Ferguson – 35 rushes, 118 yards
- MICH

Top receivers

- ND
- MICH

Bob Crable (10 tackles) leaped to block the potential-game winning field in the final seconds.

=== At Air Force ===
Team	1	2	3	4	Total
• Notre Dame	10	21	0	7	38
Air Force	0	7	6	0	13

- Date: October 13
- Location: Falcon Stadium, Colorado Springs, Colorado
- Game attendance: 34,881

Scoring summary
Q1	ND	Ferguson 5 yard run (Male kick)	ND 7–0
Q1	ND	Male 43 yard field goal	ND 10–0
Q2	ND	Lisch 1 yard run (Male kick)	ND 17–0
Q2	AFA	James 1 yard run (Sturch kick)	ND 17–7
Q2	ND	Vehr 2 yard pass from Lisch (Male kick)	ND 24–7
Q2	ND	Ferguson 23 yard run (Male kick)	ND 31–7
Q3	AFA	Schafer 2 yard pass from Ziebart (run failed)	ND 31–13
Q4	ND	Hunter 75 yard pass from Lisch (Male kick)	ND 38–13

=== South Carolina ===
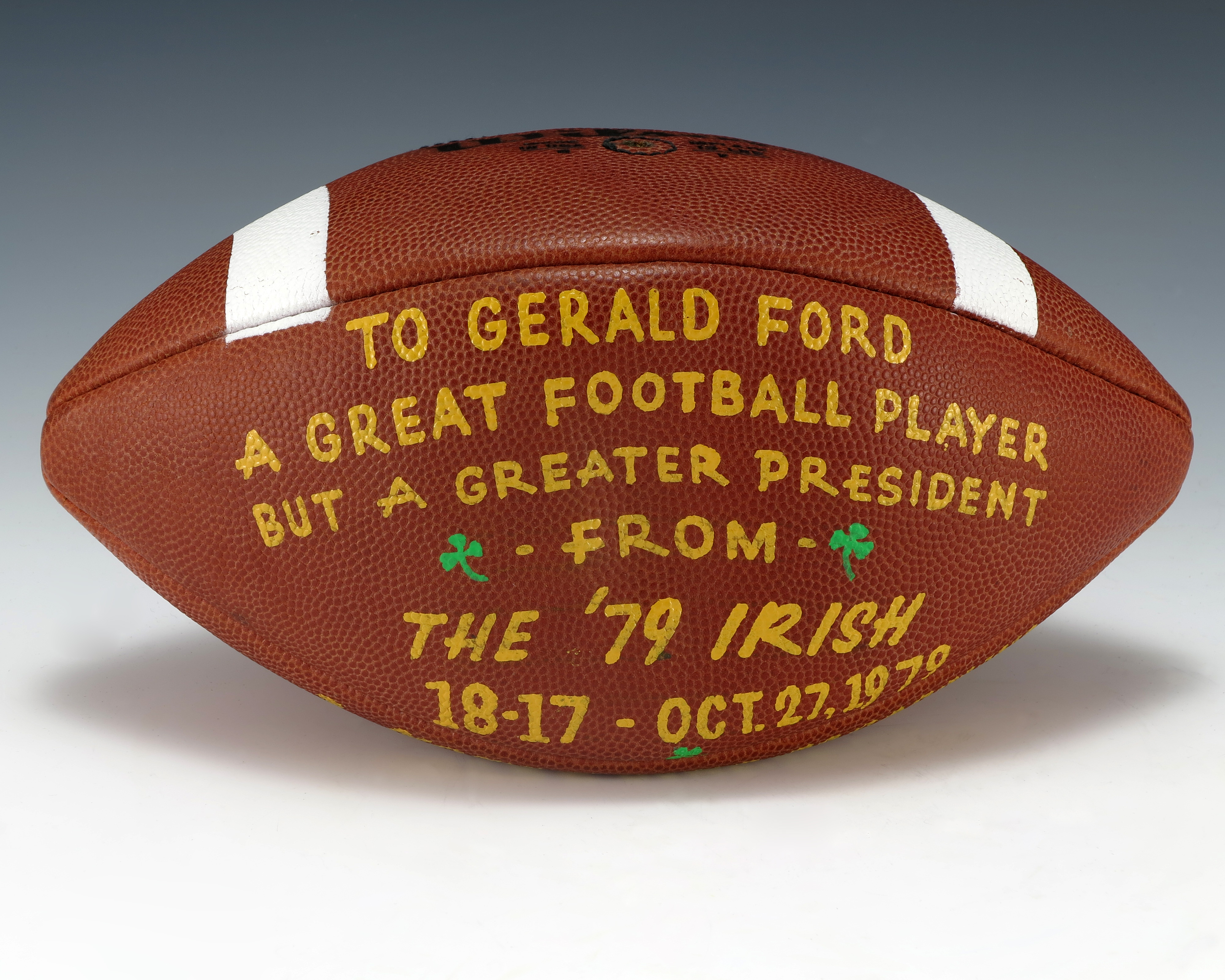
A football gifted by the Notre Dame Fighting Irish football team to President Gerald Ford, commemorating their 18–17 victory over South Carolina on October 27.

=== Navy ===
Team	1	2	3	4	Total
Navy	0	0	0	0	0
• Notre Dame	7	0	0	7	14

- Date: November 3
- Location: Notre Dame Stadium
- Game attendance: 59,075

Scoring summary
Q1	ND	Lisch 1 yard run (Male kick)	ND 7–0
Q4	ND	Ferguson 3 yard run (Male kick)	ND 14–0

- ND: Ferguson 34 Rush, 155 Yds (first player in school history with 3,000 career rushing yards)

== Roster ==
1979 Notre Dame Fighting Irish football team roster
Players
Coaches
Offense

Pos.	#	Name	Class
RB	11	Bernie Adell
RB	12	Ty Barber
G	65	Bob Burger	Jr
WR	80	Dave Condeni	So
QB	2	Mike Courey	Jr
C	53	Jeff Crippin	Sr
TE	81	Marty Detmer	Jr
WR	1	Ty Dickerson	Jr
OT	77	Randy Ellis	Fr
RB	32	Vagas Ferguson	Sr
OT	73	Tim Foley	Sr
C	55	Robb Gagnon
TE	97	Kevin Hart	Sr
WR	31	Pete Holohan	Jr
G	66	Ted Horansky	Sr
G	78	Tim Huffman	Jr
QB	13	Greg Knafelc	Jr
QB	14	Tim Koegel	Jr
G	69	John Leon	Sr
QB	6	Rusty Lisch	Sr
OT	75	Rob Martinovich	Sr
TE	86	Dean Masztak	So
OT	71	Phil Pozderac	So
C	57	John Scully	Jr
RB	42	Jim Stone	Jr
WR	84	Tim Tripp	So
TE	95	Nick Vehr	Jr

Defense

Pos.	#	Name	Class
FS	21	Dave Barry	Fr
DT	94	Tom Bock	So
LB	43	Bob Crable	So
DL	87	Mark Czaja	Jr
S	22	Dave Duerson	Fr
CB	27	Tom Gibbons	Jr
DE	92	Joe Gramke
DT		Kevin Griffith
DE	47	John Hankerd	Jr
DL	63	Don Kidd	Jr
DE	98	Pat Kramer
CB	19	John Krimm	So
LB	61	Bobby Leopold	Sr
LB	59	Brendan Moynihan	Jr
LB	51	Joe Rudzinski	Fr
DT	64	Tom Thayer	Fr
DB	34	Dave Waymer	Sr
LB	54	Mike Whittington	Sr
DE	70	Scott Zettek	Jr

Special teams

Pos.	#	Name	Class
P		Dick Boushka
K	4	Chuck Male	Sr
LS	50	Bill Siewe	Jr

Head coach

- Dan Devine

Coordinators/assistant coaches

Legend

- (C) Team captain
- (S) Suspended
- (I) Ineligible
- Injured
- Redshirt

== Team players in the NFL ==
Player	Position	Round	Pick	NFL club
Vagas Ferguson	Running back	1	25	New England Patriots
Dave Waymer	Cornerback	2	41	New Orleans Saints
Tim Foley	Tackle	2	51	Baltimore Colts
Rusty Lisch	Quarterback	4	89	St. Louis Cardinals
Bobby Leopold	Linebacker	8	210	San Francisco 49ers
Rob Martinovich	Tackle	10	261	Kansas City Chiefs
