= 1979 Tennessee Volunteers football team =

American college football season

1979 Tennessee Volunteers football

Astro-Bluebonnet Bowl, L 22–27 vs. Purdue
- Conference: Southeastern Conference
- Record: 7–5 (3–3 SEC)
- Head coach: Johnny Majors (3rd season)
- Offensive coordinator: Joe Avezzano (3rd season)
- Defensive coordinator: Frank Emanuel (1st season)
- Captains: Roland James; Craig Puki; Jimmy Streater
- Home stadium: Neyland Stadium

1979 Southeastern Conference football standings
	Conf.					Overall
Team	W		L		T	W		L		T
No. 1 Alabama $	6	–	0	–	0	12	–	0	–	0
Georgia	5	–	1	–	0	6	–	5	–	0
No. 16 Auburn	4	–	2	–	0	8	–	3	–	0
LSU	4	–	2	–	0	7	–	5	–	0
Tennessee	3	–	3	–	0	7	–	5	–	0
Kentucky	3	–	3	–	0	5	–	6	–	0
Ole Miss	3	–	3	–	0	4	–	7	–	0
Mississippi State	2	–	4	–	0	3	–	8	–	0
Vanderbilt	0	–	6	–	0	1	–	10	–	0
Florida	0	–	6	–	0	0	–	10	–	1
$ – Conference champion; Rankings from AP Poll

The 1979 Tennessee Volunteers football team (variously "Tennessee", "UT" or the "Vols") represented the University of Tennessee in the 1979 NCAA Division I-A football season. Playing as a member of the Southeastern Conference (SEC), the team was led by head coach Johnny Majors, in his third year, and played their home games at Neyland Stadium in Knoxville, Tennessee. They finished the season with a record of seven wins and five losses (7–5 overall, 3–3 in the SEC) and a loss against Purdue in the Astro-Bluebonnet Bowl.

== Schedule ==
Date	Opponent	Rank	Site	TV	Result	Attendance	Source
September 15	at Boston College*		Alumni Stadium; Chestnut Hill, MA		W 28–16	30,150	
September 22	Utah*		Neyland Stadium; Knoxville, TN		W 51–18	85,783	
September 29	Auburn		Neyland Stadium; Knoxville, TN		W 35–17	85,936	
October 6	vs. Mississippi State	No. 19	Liberty Bowl Memorial Stadium; Memphis, TN		L 9–28	48,820	
October 13	Georgia Tech*		Neyland Stadium; Knoxville, TN (rivalry)		W 31–0	85,524	
October 20	at No. 1 Alabama	No. 18	Legion Field; Birmingham, AL (Third Saturday in October)		L 17–27	77,665	
November 3	Rutgers*^{†}	No. 17	Neyland Stadium; Knoxville, TN		L 7–13	84,265	
November 10	No. 13 Notre Dame*		Neyland Stadium; Knoxville, TN		W 40–18	86,489	
November 17	at Ole Miss	No. 19	Mississippi Veterans Memorial Stadium; Jackson, MS (rivalry)		L 20–44	55,760	
November 24	at Kentucky		Commonwealth Stadium; Lexington, KY (rivalry)		W 20–17	57,950	
December 1	Vanderbilt		Neyland Stadium; Knoxville, TN (rivalry)		W 31–10	84,142	
December 31	vs. No. 12 Purdue*		Houston Astrodome; Houston, TX (Astro-Bluebonnet Bowl)	Mizlou	L 22–27	40,542	
*Non-conference game; ^{†}Homecoming; Rankings from AP Poll released prior to the game

== Personnel ==
1979 Tennessee Volunteers football team roster
Players
Coaches
Offense

Pos.	#	Name	Class
RB	34	James Berry	So
G	64	Roy Cunningham	Fr
RB	43	Terry Daniels	So
WR	24	Clyde Duncan	Fr
WR	26	Willie Gault	Fr
WR	28	Anthony Hancock	So
TE	85	Reggie Harper	Jr
WR	4	Phil Ingram	Jr
OT	78	Tim Irwin	Jr
G	68	Mike Jester	Jr
C	59	Alan Lynn	Sr
G	70	Bill Marren	Sr
RB	33	Gary Moore	Sr
C	73	Lee North	So
QB	5	Jeff Olszewski	So
QB	8	David Rudder	Sr
RB	32	Hubert Simpson	Jr
QB	6	Jimmy Streater	Sr
OT	67	Phil Sutton	Sr
G	71	Jay Williams	Jr

Defense

Pos.	#	Name	Class
DB	42	Val Barksdale	Jr
DB	40	Bill Bates	Fr
DE	93	Mike Cofer	Fr
DE	57	Steve Davis	Sr
DB	26	Greg Gaines	Jr
DE	84	Brian Ingram	Jr
S	14	Roland James	Sr
DB	29	Danny Martin	Jr
DT	60	Jim Noonan	Sr
LB	44	Craig Puki	Sr
LB	50	Danny Spradlin	Jr
DE	83	John Wade	Fr
DT	90	Brad White	Jr

Special teams

Pos.	#	Name	Class
K	10	Alan Duncan	Jr
P	49	Dale Schnitman	Sr
P	20	John Warren	Fr

Head coach

- Johnny Majors

Coordinators/assistant coaches

- Joe Avezzano – Offensive coordinator/offensive line
- Lynn Amedee – Quarterbacks
- Bobby Jackson – Running backs
- Bob Harrison – Wide receivers
- Frank Emanuel – Defensive coordinator/defensive ends
- Jim Dyar – Defensive line
- Robbie Franklin – Outside linebacker
- Joe Madden – Defensive backs/assistant head coach
- John Chavis – Graduate assistant

Legend

- (C) Team captain
- (S) Suspended
- (I) Ineligible
- Injured
- Redshirt

== Game summaries ==
=== At Kentucky ===
Team	1	2	3	4	Total
• Tennessee	3	7	7	3	20
Kentucky	0	14	0	3	17

- Date: November 25
- Location: Commonwealth Stadium, Lexington, KY
- Game attendance: 57,950

Scoring summary
Q1		TENN	Duncan 30 yard field goal	TENN 3–0
Q2		TENN	Simpson 12 yard pass from Olszewski (Duncan kick)	TENN 10–0
Q2		UK	Jones 57 yard run (kick failed)	TEN 10–6
Q2		UK	Wilson 9 yard pass from Henry (Jones run)	UK 14–10
Q3		TENN	Berry 2 yard run (Duncan kick)	TENN 17–14
Q4		UK	Streim 25 yard field goal	Tie 17–17
Q4	:05	TENN	Duncan 25 yard field goal	TENN 20–17

=== Vanderbilt ===
Vanderbilt Commodores (1–9) at Tennessee Volunteers (6–4)

Quarter	1	2	3	4	Total
Vanderbilt	10	0	0	0	10
Tennessee	0	0	21	10	31

at Neyland Stadium, Knoxville, Tennessee

- Date: December 1
- Game attendance: 84,142

Game information

First quarter

- VAN – Mike Woodard 31-yard field goal. Vanderbilt 3–0. Drive:
- VAN – Van Heflin 1-yard run (Mike Woodard kick). Vanderbilt 10–0. Drive:

Second quarter

- No scoring

Third quarter

- TEN – Anthony Hancock 41-yard pass from Jimmy Streater (Alan Duncan kick), 11:45. Vanderbilt 10–7. Drive: 7 plays, 72 yards.
- TEN – Roland James 89-yard punt return (Alan Duncan kick). Tennessee 14–10.
- TEN – Anthony Hancock 85-yard pass from Jimmy Streater (Alan Duncan kick). Tennessee 21–10. Drive:

Fourth quarter

- TEN – Gary Moore 17-yard run (Alan Duncan kick). Tennessee 28–10. Drive:
- TEN – Alan Duncan 27-yard field goal. Tennessee 31–10. Drive:

Top passers

- VAN – Van Heflin – 6/16, 50 yards, 3 INT
- TEN – Jimmy Streater – 13/23, 221 yards, 2 TD, INT

Top rushers

- VAN – Terry Potter – 19 rushes, 127 yards
- TEN – Hubert Simpson – 19 rushes, 42 yards

Top receivers

- VAN – Preston Brown – 2 receptions, 27 yards
- TEN – Anthony Hancock – 6 receptions, 163 yards, 2 TD

- Jimmy Streater became school's all-time leading passer

=== Bluebonnet Bowl (vs. Purdue) ===
Team	1	2	3	4	Total
• Purdue	0	14	7	6	27
Tennessee	0	0	16	6	22

- Date: December 31
- Location: Astrodome, Houston, Texas
- Game attendance: 40,542

Scoring summary
2	Purdue	Ben McCall 6-yard run (John Seibel kick)	Purdue 7-0
2	Purdue	Bart Burrell 12-yard pass from Mark Herrmann (John Seibel kick)	Purdue 14-0
3	Purdue	Dave Young 12-yard pass from Mark Herrmann (John Seibel kick)	Purdue 21-0
3	Tennessee	Glenn Ford 8-yard pass from Jimmy Streater (pass failed)	Purdue 21-6
4	Tennessee	James Berry 15-yard pass from Phil Ingram (Hubert Simpson run)	Purdue 21-14
4	Tennessee	Hubert Simpson 1-yard run (Hubert Simpson pass from Jimmy Streater)	Tennessee 22-21
4	Purdue	Dave Young 17-yard pass from Mark Herrmann (pass failed)	Purdue 27-22

== Team players drafted into the NFL ==
Player	Position	Round	Pick	NFL club
Roland James	Defensive Back	1	14	New England Patriots
Craig Puki	Linebacker	3	77	San Francisco 49ers
