= 1979 Florida State Seminoles football team =

American college football season

1979 Florida State Seminoles football

Orange Bowl, L 7–24 vs. Oklahoma
- Conference: Independent

Ranking
- Coaches: No. 8
- AP: No. 6
- Record: 11–1
- Head coach: Bobby Bowden (4th season)
- Offensive coordinator: George Henshaw (1st season)
- Offensive scheme: Pro-style
- Defensive coordinator: Jack Stanton (4th season)
- Base defense: 4–3
- Captains: Mike Good; Ivory Joe Hunter; Scott Warren; Wally Woodham
- Home stadium: Doak Campbell Stadium

1979 NCAA Division I-A independents football records
| | Conf. | | | | | Overall |
| Team | W | | L | | T | W | | L | | T |
|---|---|---|---|---|---|---|---|---|---|---|
| No. 6 Florida State | | – | | – | | 11 | – | 1 | – | 0 |
| No. 7 Pittsburgh | | – | | – | | 11 | – | 1 | – | 0 |
| UNLV | | – | | – | | 9 | – | 1 | – | 2 |
| No. 17 Temple | | – | | – | | 10 | – | 2 | – | 0 |
| Tulane | | – | | – | | 9 | – | 3 | – | 0 |
| Rutgers | | – | | – | | 8 | – | 3 | – | 0 |
| Tennessee State | | – | | – | | 8 | – | 3 | – | 0 |
| East Carolina | | – | | – | | 7 | – | 3 | – | 1 |
| No. 20 Penn State | | – | | – | | 8 | – | 4 | – | 0 |
| South Carolina | | – | | – | | 8 | – | 4 | – | 0 |
| Navy | | – | | – | | 7 | – | 4 | – | 0 |
| Notre Dame | | – | | – | | 7 | – | 4 | – | 0 |
| Southern Miss | | – | | – | | 6 | – | 4 | – | 1 |
| Syracuse | | – | | – | | 7 | – | 5 | – | 0 |
| Colgate | | – | | – | | 5 | – | 4 | – | 1 |
| Boston College | | – | | – | | 5 | – | 6 | – | 0 |
| Holy Cross | | – | | – | | 5 | – | 6 | – | 0 |
| Memphis State | | – | | – | | 5 | – | 6 | – | 0 |
| Miami (FL) | | – | | – | | 5 | – | 6 | – | 0 |
| North Texas State | | – | | – | | 5 | – | 6 | – | 0 |
| Villanova | | – | | – | | 5 | – | 6 | – | 0 |
| Virginia Tech | | – | | – | | 5 | – | 6 | – | 0 |
| West Virginia | | – | | – | | 5 | – | 6 | – | 0 |
| Georgia Tech | | – | | – | | 4 | – | 6 | – | 1 |
| Louisville | | – | | – | | 4 | – | 6 | – | 1 |
| William & Mary | | – | | – | | 4 | – | 7 | – | 0 |
| Illinois State | | – | | – | | 3 | – | 8 | – | 0 |
| Northeast Louisiana | | – | | – | | 3 | – | 8 | – | 0 |
| Army | | – | | – | | 2 | – | 8 | – | 1 |
| Air Force | | – | | – | | 2 | – | 9 | – | 0 |
| Cincinnati | | – | | – | | 2 | – | 9 | – | 0 |
| Richmond | | – | | – | | 0 | – | 11 | – | 0 |
Rankings from AP Poll

The 1979 Florida State Seminoles football team represented Florida State University as an independent during the 1979 NCAA Division I-A football season. The team was coached by Bobby Bowden and played their home games at Doak Campbell Stadium. Florida State finished No. 6 in the AP poll and No. 8 in the UPI poll with an 11–1 record. The Seminoles' offense scored 326 points while the defense allowed 160 points. The Seminoles finished the regular season unbeaten for only the second time in program history and played in the Orange Bowl.

== Schedule ==
| Date | Opponent | Rank | Site | TV | Result | Attendance | Source |
|---|---|---|---|---|---|---|---|
| September 8 | Southern Miss | No. 19 | Doak Campbell Stadium; Tallahassee, FL | | W 17–14 | 45,467 | |
| September 15 | vs. Arizona State | No. 18 | Tampa Stadium; Tampa, FL | | W 31–3 | 33,484 | |
| September 22 | Miami (FL) | No. 14 | Doak Campbell Stadium; Tallahassee, FL (rivalry) | | W 40–23 | 47,679 | |
| September 29 | at Virginia Tech | No. 12 | Lane Stadium; Blacksburg, VA | ABC | W 17–10 | 39,200 | |
| October 6 | at Louisville | No. 9 | Fairgrounds Stadium; Louisville, KY | | W 27–0 | 27,306 | |
| October 13 | Mississippi State | No. 9 | Doak Campbell Stadium; Tallahassee, FL | | W 17–6 | 48,701 | |
| October 27 | at LSU | No. 7 | Tiger Stadium; Baton Rouge, LA | ABC | W 24–19 | 67,197 | |
| November 3 | at Cincinnati | No. 6 | Nippert Stadium; Cincinnati, OH | | W 26–21 | 14,539 | |
| November 10 | No. 19 South Carolina | No. 7 | Doak Campbell Stadium; Tallahassee, FL | | W 27–7 | 49,490 | |
| November 17 | Memphis State | No. 5 | Doak Campbell Stadium; Tallahassee, FL | | W 66–17 | 48,021 | |
| November 23 | at Florida | No. 5 | Florida Field; Gainesville, FL (rivalry) | ABC | W 27–16 | 58,263 | |
| January 1 | vs. No. 5 Oklahoma | No. 4 | Miami Orange Bowl; Miami, FL (Orange Bowl) | NBC | L 7–24 | 66,714 | |
Rankings from AP Poll released prior to the game

== Season summary ==
Mark Lyles led the team in rushing with 1011 yards and 8 touchdowns. Jimmy Jordan led the team in passing with 1173 yards and threw 13 touchdown passes. Jackie Flowers led the team in receiving with 37 catches for 622 yards and 7 TD receptions. Monk Bonasorte led the team with 8 pass interceptions. Bonassorte {DB}, Bobby Butler {DB}, Jackie Flowers {TE}, Mike Good {G}, Ken Lanier {OT}, Ron Simmons {NG} and Scott Warren {DE} were selected to the First team All-South Independent team. Ron Simmons was selected as a First team All-American. Bonasorte was a 3rd team AP All-American. Bobby Butler {DB}, Jackie Flowers, Mike Good, Jimmy Jordan {QB} and Ken Lanier were named as Honorable Mention All-Americans by the Associated Press and/or The Sporting News. Mark Lyles {RB} {Cincinnati}, Flowers {Dallas}, Walter Carter {DT} {Oakland} and Jordan {New England} were selected in the 1980 NFL draft.

=== Southern Miss ===
| Team | 1 | 2 | 3 | 4 | Total |
|---|---|---|---|---|---|
| Southern Miss | 0 | 7 | 7 | 0 | 14 |
| • Florida St | 3 | 0 | 0 | 14 | 17 |

- Date: September 8
- Location: Doak Campbell Stadium

Behind 14-3 with 10 minutes left in the last quarter, Florida State struck for two quick touchdowns and overtook Southern Mississippi 17-14 before 45,467 fans at Doak Campbell Stadium. Jimmy Jordan threw an 8 yard TD pass to Jackie Flowers, then a 65 yard punt return for a touchdown by Gary Henry with 6:28 put the Seminoles in front to stay.

=== Arizona State ===
| Team | 1 | 2 | 3 | 4 | Total |
|---|---|---|---|---|---|
| Arizona St | 0 | 0 | 3 | 0 | 3 |
| • Florida St | 7 | 17 | 0 | 7 | 31 |

- Date: September 15
- Location: Tampa Stadium

Florida State romped to an easy 31-3 football victory over Arizona State. It was 24-0 at halftime. Monk Bonasorte helped to provide 10 first half points with two interceptions. Wally Woodham threw 18 yards to Jackie Flowers for a touchdown. Mark Lyles ran 1 yard for a touchdown to give FSU a 14-0 lead. Dave Cappelen kicked a 42 yard field goal and Jimmy Jordan threw his first of two touchdown passes, an 8 yard pass to Grady King. In the 4th quarter he threw 15 yards to Ricky Williams for the final Seminole touchdown.

=== Miami (FL) ===
Miami (FL) Hurricanes (1–0) at #14 Florida State Seminoles (2–0)

| Quarter | 1 | 2 | 3 | 4 | Total |
|---|---|---|---|---|---|
| Miami (FL) | 7 | 0 | 0 | 16 | 23 |
| Florida St | 3 | 16 | 14 | 7 | 40 |

at Doak Campbell Stadium, Tallahassee, Florida

- Date: September 22
- Game attendance: 48,432

Game information

First quarter

- FSU – Dave Cappelen 26-yard field goal, 9:12. Florida St 3–0.
- MIA – Chris Hobbs 10-yard run (Dan Miller kick), 4:29. Miami (FL) 7–3.

Second quarter

- FSU – Mark Lyles 4-yard run (Dave Cappelen kick), 12:30. Florida St 10–7.
- FSU – Dave Cappelen 28-yard field goal, 6:21. Florida St 13–7.
- FSU – Mark Lyles 1-yard run (pass failed), 0:22. Florida St 19–7.

Third quarter

- FSU – Greg Ramsey 3-yard run (Dave Cappelen kick), 10:58. Florida St 26–7.
- FSU – Greg Ramsey 2-yard run (Dave Cappelen kick), 1:52. Florida St 33–7.

Fourth quarter

- MIA – Jim Kelly 2-yard run (run good), 11:29. Florida St 33–15.
- FSU – Gary Henry 57-yard blocked punt return (Dave Cappelen kick), 10:00. Florida St 40–15.
- MIA – James Joiner 9-yard run (run good), 7:58. Florida St 40–23.

Top passers

- MIA
- FSU – Wally Woodham – 9/14, 93 yards

Top rushers

- MIA
- FSU – Mark Lyles – 25 rushes, 85 yards, 2 TD

Top receivers

- MIA
- FSU – Sam Platt – 3 receptions, 46 yards

Miami jumped out to an early lead after the first quarter, but that would pretty much be all they could celebrate during this day in the Capital City. Two Mark Lyles touchdowns in the second quarter helped the Seminoles take a 19-7 lead at the half, while Greg Ramsey would add two rushing scores in the third quarter and the route was on. The Hurricanes scored a touchdown to open the fourth quarter, but Gary Henry’s return of a blocked punt cemented the outcome and Florida State was able to celebrate in their own locker room after defeating the Hurricanes at home for the first time, 40-23, pacing the Noles to the first undefeated regular season under Bobby Bowden.

=== Virginia Tech ===
It was Virginia Tech's last chance to win. Fourth down and 13 at its 17. As Steve Casey rolled to pass, Seminole linebacker Paul Piurowski was bearing down on him. Casey slipped as he tried to maneuver, and Piurowski was on top of him at the 12 and the Florida State held on for a 17-10 victory. Trailing 7-0 in the 2nd quarter, the Seminoles struck on a Greg Ramsey 16 yard run and Jackie Flowers 18 yard TD pass from Jimmy Jordan. Dave Cappelen added a 20 yard field goal in the 3rd quarter. Wally Woodham and Jimmy Jordan combined for 322 yards passing, but threw 4 interceptions.

=== Louisville ===
| Team | 1 | 2 | 3 | 4 | Total |
|---|---|---|---|---|---|
| • Florida St | 7 | 8 | 9 | 3 | 27 |
| Louisville | 0 | 0 | 0 | 0 | 0 |

- Date: October 6
- Location: Cardinal Stadium

Blocking two punts, holding Louisville to just two first downs until 7:30 was left on the clock, Florida State's defense was again the dominant show as the unbeaten Seminoles won 27-0. FSU did it on two touchdowns, a couple of safeties and a field goal before 27,306 fans at Fairgrounds Stadium. Wally Woodham threw two touchdowns, one to Sam Platt (5 yards) and one to Sam Childers (1 yard). Bobby Butler fell on a blocked punt in the end zone for a touchdown.

=== Mississippi State ===
| Team | 1 | 2 | 3 | 4 | Total |
|---|---|---|---|---|---|
| Miss St | 0 | 0 | 0 | 6 | 6 |
| • Florida St | 0 | 14 | 3 | 0 | 17 |

- Date: October 13
- Location: Doak Campbell Stadium

Putting two touchdowns on the scoreboard in the final six minutes of the first half, Florida State held on with its defense in the closing two quarters and claimed a 17-6 victory over Mississippi State. FSU scored on a one yard run by Mike Whiting, and on an 18 yard pass from Jimmy Jordan to Jackie Flowers. Dave Cappelen kicked a 46 yard field goal.

=== LSU ===
| Team | 1 | 2 | 3 | 4 | Total |
|---|---|---|---|---|---|
| • Florida St | 7 | 7 | 0 | 10 | 24 |
| LSU | 0 | 13 | 0 | 6 | 19 |

- Date: October 27
- Location: Tiger Stadium
- TV announcers (ABC): Jim Lampley & Frank Broyles

Jimmy Jordan gunned three touchdown passes as Florida State muscled past Louisiana State 24-19 before 67,197 in Tiger Stadium. Jordan completed 14 passes for 312 yards. In the 1st half, the Seminoles forced three LSU fumbles and recovered all three. Florida State, in the 2nd half, intercepted two passes. Monk Bonasorte recovered a fumble and intercepted two passes. Florida State totaled 436 yards of offense. Jordan’s TD passes went to Sam Platt (3 yards), Jackie Flowers (40 yards) and Hardis Johnson (53 yards).

=== Cincinnati ===
| Team | 1 | 2 | 3 | 4 | Total |
|---|---|---|---|---|---|
| • Florida St | 7 | 0 | 0 | 19 | 26 |
| Cincinnati | 0 | 21 | 0 | 0 | 21 |

- Date: November 3
- Location: Nippert Stadium

The sixth ranked Seminoles squeezed past Cincinnati 26-21 when Mike Whiting crashed into the end zone from eight yards out with 1:38 left to play. The Seminoles trailed 21-7 at the start of the fourth quarter. Ahead 7-0 after their first offensive series, FSU was stunned by a 21 point 2nd quarter onslaught by Cincinnati, a 17 1/2 point underdog. Wally Woodham led the charge in the 4th quarter with touchdown passes to Mark Lyles (7 yards) and Jackie Flowers (5 yards), followed by Whiting’s game winner.

=== South Carolina ===
| Team | 1 | 2 | 3 | 4 | Total |
|---|---|---|---|---|---|
| South Carolina | 0 | 7 | 0 | 0 | 7 |
| • Florida St | 10 | 6 | 0 | 11 | 27 |

- Date: November 10
- Location: Doak Campbell Stadium

A record Doak Campbell Stadium crowd of 49,490 saw the 9-0 Seminoles beat South Carolina 27-7. Wally Woodham completed 15 of 25 passes for 145 yards. Florida State nominated possession, 83 plays to 52, and totaled 381 yards to Carolina's 265. Mark Lyles ran for 132 yards on 25 carries and a 1 yard touchdown run. Dave Capellen kicked four field goals. Jimmy Jordan threw a 7 yard TD pass to Sam Childers.

=== Memphis State ===
| Team | 1 | 2 | 3 | 4 | Total |
|---|---|---|---|---|---|
| Memphis St | 3 | 0 | 0 | 14 | 17 |
| • Florida St | 3 | 21 | 28 | 14 | 66 |

- Date: November 17
- Location: Doak Campbell Stadium

Florida State clobbered Memphis State 66-17 before 48,021 at Doak Campbell Stadium. Memphis State's defense had given up just three touchdown passes. Quarterback Jimmy Jordan threw for that many in the second quarter. Two of those Jordan TD shots came in the last 45 seconds of the half, stretching a 10-3 lead to 24-3. Jordan’s touchdown passes were to Jackie Flowers (24 yards), Hardis Johnson (4 yards) and Grady King (5 yards). The defense and special teams got their shots in as well with Paul Piurowski returning an interception 29 yards for a touchdown and Keith Jones returning a blocked punt (by Bobby Butler) 16 yards for a touchdown. Mark Lyles, Ricky Williams, Keith Kennedy and Kelly Burney ran for touchdowns for the Noles.

=== At Florida ===
#5 Florida State Seminoles (10–0) at Florida Gators (0–9–1)

| Quarter | 1 | 2 | 3 | 4 | Total |
|---|---|---|---|---|---|
| Florida St | 3 | 7 | 0 | 17 | 27 |
| Florida | 0 | 0 | 10 | 6 | 16 |

at Florida Field, Gainesville, Florida

- Date: November 23
- Game attendance: 58,263
- TV announcers (ABC): Jim Lampley & Lee Grosscup

Game information

First quarter

- FSU – Dave Cappelen 42-yard field goal, 4:23. Florida St 3–0.

Second quarter

- FSU – Hardis Johnson 21-yard pass from Jimmy Jordan (Dave Cappelen kick), 0:11. Florida St 10–0. Drive: 71 yards.

Third quarter

- FLA – Brian Clark 39-yard field goal, 11:39. Florida St 10–3.
- FLA – Carl Prioleau 2-yard run (Brian Clark kick), 1:28. Tie 10–10.

Fourth quarter

- FSU – Mark Lyles 20-yard run (Bill Capece kick), 12:31. Florida St 17–10. Drive: 80 yards.
- FSU – Bill Capece 18-yard field goal, 10:46. Florida St 20–10.
- FLA – Chris Faulkner 35-yard pass from Larry Ochab (pass failed), 2:21. Florida St 20–16.
- FSU – Mark Lyles 2-yard run (Bill Capece kick), 1:10. Florida St 27–16.

Top passers

- FSU – Wally Woodham – 7/10, 82 yards
- FLA – Larry Ochab – 22/54, 270 yards, TD, 5 INT

Top rushers

- FSU – Mark Lyles – 20 rushes, 151 yards, TD
- FLA

Top receivers

- FSU – Grady King – 6 receptions, 59 yards
- FLA

Florida hosted Florida State at Florida Field in a regionally televised contest on ABC-TV. A debatable ruling on an interception by FSU’s Walter Carter led to a Bill Capece field goal that gave the Seminoles a 20-10 lead in the fourth quarter. The game had been tied 10-10 early in the final period. Mark Lyles’ two fourth quarter touchdowns however, would be just what the Seminoles needed as FSU completed a perfect regular season. Lyles rushed for 151 yards while teammate Michael Whiting added 123 yards on the ground. Defensively, Florida State forced six turnovers for their third straight victory over rival Florida. The Noles went on to a 27-16 victory.

=== Oklahoma—Orange Bowl ===
| Team | 1 | 2 | 3 | 4 | Total |
|---|---|---|---|---|---|
| • Oklahoma | 0 | 17 | 0 | 7 | 24 |
| Florida St | 7 | 0 | 0 | 0 | 7 |

- Date: January 1
- Location: Orange Bowl

Mike Whiting gave the Seminoles a lead with his touchdown run, but that was their only score of the night. A fumbled field goal snap, three turnovers, over 100 yards of rushing by quarterback J. C. Watts and halfback Billy Sims, and 24 unanswered points by Oklahoma doomed the Seminoles. It all started with a Watts run for a touchdown in the second quarter to tie the game at seven. After the kickoff, the Seminoles turned the ball over on an interception, giving the ball back to Oklahoma. Stanley Wilson then scored a touchdown run to make it 14–7. Mike Keeling added a field goal late in the quarter to give the Sooners a 17–7 lead at halftime. The second half scoring was limited to one Oklahoma touchdown from 22 yards out in the fourth quarter; Watts ran for twelve yards before pitching the ball to Sims, who took it the rest of the way for a 24–7 lead, the final score. The Sooners ran for 411 yards on 59 carries, an average of nearly seven yards per attempt, while having twice as many total yards as the Seminoles.

== Roster ==
1979 Florida State Seminoles football team roster
Players
Coaches
Offense

| Pos. | # | Name | Class |
|---|---|---|---|
| G | 63 | Lee Adams | Jr |
| C | 52 | Willie Andrusko | So |
| WR | 88 | Jeff Bowden | So |
| OT | 75 | Tom Brannon | Jr |
| G | 61 | Brent Brock | Jr |
| QB | | Ken Burnett |
| RB | | Kelly Burney |
| RB | | Gator Cherry |
| TE | | Sam Childers |
| WR | 23 | Jackie Flowers | Sr |
| OL | | Greg Futch |
| OL | | Mike Good |
| QB | 4 | Rick Houston | Sr |
| WR | | Hardis Johnson |
| RB | | Homes Johnson |
| WR | | Tony Johnson |
| QB | 15 | Jimmy Jordan | Sr |
| TE | | Bill Keck |
| RB | | Keith Kennedy |
| TE | | Grady King |
| OT | 72 | Ken Lanier | Jr |
| RB | | Mark Lyles |
| OL | | John Madden |
| WR | | Dennis McKinnon |
| WR | 18 | Joe Moss | So |
| TE | 81 | Zeke Mowatt | Fr |
| WR | | Sam Platt |
| RB | | Greg Ramsey |
| QB | 11 | Rick Stockstill | So |
| WR | 82 | Lawrence Strainge | So |
| WR | 9 | Greg Thompson | Fr |
| WR | 19 | Kurt Unglaub | Sr |
| FB | 26 | Wade Wallace | Sr |
| OL | | Gil Wesley |
| FB | 27 | Michael Whiting | So |
| WR | | Phil Williams |
| RB | | Ricky Williams |
| QB | | Wally Woodham |

Defense

| Pos. | # | Name | Class |
|---|---|---|---|
| FB | 44 | Eddie Swensen |
| DB | | Mark Bonasorte |
| CB | 21 | Bobby Butler | Jr |
| DT | 76 | Walter Carter | Sr |
| DL | | Jarvis Coursey |
| DT | 91 | John Diamantas | So |
| DB | 20 | Jeff Ector | Fr |
| DL | | James Gilbert |
| DB | 43 | Hector Gray |
| DB | | Gary Henry |
| LB | | Reggie Herring |
| DB | | Ivory Joe Hunter |
| DB | | Keith Jones |
| DL | | Mark Macek |
| DT | 60 | Scott McLean | So |
| DT | 77 | Jeremy Mindlin |
| LB | | Paul Piurowski |
| DL | | Ed Richardson |
| DL | | Arthur Scott |
| DL | | Ron Simmons |
| DL | | Scott Warren |

Special teams

| Pos. | # | Name | Class |
|---|---|---|---|
| K | | Bill Capece |
| K | | Dave Cappelen |
| P | 3 | Rohn Stark | So |

Head coach

- Bobby Bowden

Coordinators/assistant coaches

- George Henshaw (Offensive coordinator)
- Kent Schoolfield (Wide receivers)
- Dick Hopkins (Graduate assistant)

Legend

- (C) Team captain
- (S) Suspended
- (I) Ineligible
- Injured
- Redshirt

== Awards and honors ==
Monk Bonasorte

- Associated Press – 3rd Team All-American

Bobby Butler

- Associated Press – All-American – Honorable Mention

Jackie Flowers

- Football News – 2nd Team All-American
- United Press International – 2nd Team All-American
- Associated Press – All-American – Honorable Mention
- The Sporting News – All-American – Honorable Mention

Mike Good

- Associated Press – All-American – Honorable Mention

Ken Lanier

- Associated Press – All-American – Honorable Mention

Ron Simmons

- American Football Coaches Association – 1st Team All-American
- Associated Press – 1st Team All-American
- Walter Camp – 1st Team All-American
- Football News – 1st Team All-American
- Kodak – 1st Team All-American
- United Press International – 1st Team All-American
- NCAA – Consensus All-American
- The Sporting News – All-American – Honorable Mention

Scott Warren

- Churchman's – 1st Team All-American
- Associated Press – All-American – Honorable Mention
