= 1979 Penn State Nittany Lions football team =

American college football season

1979 Penn State Nittany Lions football

Liberty Bowl champion

Liberty Bowl, W 9–6 vs. Tulane
- Conference: Independent

Ranking
- Coaches: No. 18
- AP: No. 20
- Record: 8–4
- Head coach: Joe Paterno (14th season)
- Offensive scheme: I formation
- Defensive coordinator: Jerry Sandusky (3rd season)
- Base defense: 4–3
- Captains: Lance Mehl; Matt Millen; Irv Pankey
- Home stadium: Beaver Stadium

1979 NCAA Division I-A independents football records
	Conf.					Overall
Team	W		L		T	W		L		T
No. 6 Florida State		–		–		11	–	1	–	0
No. 7 Pittsburgh		–		–		11	–	1	–	0
UNLV		–		–		9	–	1	–	2
No. 17 Temple		–		–		10	–	2	–	0
Tulane		–		–		9	–	3	–	0
Rutgers		–		–		8	–	3	–	0
Tennessee State		–		–		8	–	3	–	0
East Carolina		–		–		7	–	3	–	1
No. 20 Penn State		–		–		8	–	4	–	0
South Carolina		–		–		8	–	4	–	0
Navy		–		–		7	–	4	–	0
Notre Dame		–		–		7	–	4	–	0
Southern Miss		–		–		6	–	4	–	1
Syracuse		–		–		7	–	5	–	0
Colgate		–		–		5	–	4	–	1
Boston College		–		–		5	–	6	–	0
Holy Cross		–		–		5	–	6	–	0
Memphis State		–		–		5	–	6	–	0
Miami (FL)		–		–		5	–	6	–	0
North Texas State		–		–		5	–	6	–	0
Villanova		–		–		5	–	6	–	0
Virginia Tech		–		–		5	–	6	–	0
West Virginia		–		–		5	–	6	–	0
Georgia Tech		–		–		4	–	6	–	1
Louisville		–		–		4	–	6	–	1
William & Mary		–		–		4	–	7	–	0
Illinois State		–		–		3	–	8	–	0
Northeast Louisiana		–		–		3	–	8	–	0
Army		–		–		2	–	8	–	1
Air Force		–		–		2	–	9	–	0
Cincinnati		–		–		2	–	9	–	0
Richmond		–		–		0	–	11	–	0
Rankings from AP Poll

The 1979 Penn State Nittany Lions football team represented Pennsylvania State University as an independent during the 1979 NCAA Division I-A football season. Led by 14th-year head coach Joe Paterno, the Nittany Lions compiled a record of 8–4 with a win over Tulane in the Liberty Bowl. Penn State played home games at Beaver Stadium in University Park, Pennsylvania.

== Schedule ==
Date	Opponent	Rank	Site	TV	Result	Attendance	Source
September 15	Rutgers	No. 7	Beaver Stadium; University Park, PA		W 45–10	77,309	
September 22	Texas A&M	No. 6	Beaver Stadium; University Park, PA		L 14–27	77,575	
September 29	at No. 6 Nebraska	No. 18	Memorial Stadium; Lincoln, NE	ABC	L 17–42	76,151	
October 6	at Maryland		Byrd Stadium; College Park, MD (rivalry)		W 27–7	52,348	
October 13	Army^{†}		Beaver Stadium; University Park, PA		W 24–3	77,157	
October 20	at Syracuse		Giants Stadium; East Rutherford, NJ (rivalry)		W 35–7	53,789	
October 27	West Virginia		Beaver Stadium; University Park, PA (rivalry)		W 31–6	77,923	
November 3	Miami (FL)	No. 19	Beaver Stadium; University Park, PA	TCS	L 10–26	75,532	
November 10	at NC State		Carter–Finley Stadium; Raleigh, NC		W 9–7	51,200	
November 17	No. 18 Temple		Beaver Stadium; University Park, PA		W 22–7	76,000	
December 1	No. 11 Pittsburgh	No. 19	Beaver Stadium; University Park, PA (rivalry)	ABC	L 14–29	76,958	
December 22	vs. No. 15 Tulane		Liberty Bowl Memorial Stadium; Memphis, TN (Liberty Bowl)	ABC	W 9–6	50,021	
^{†}Homecoming; Rankings from AP Poll released prior to the game

== Roster ==
1979 Penn State Nittany Lions football team roster
Players
Coaches
Offense

Pos.	#	Name	Class
QB	14	Todd Blackledge	Fr
WR	29	Mark Cherewka	Jr
WR	19	Tom Donovan	Sr
OT	77	Bill Dugan	Jr
G	62	Sean Farrell	So
RB	24	Mike Guman	Sr
WR	41	Tracy Hall	Jr
QB	15	Jeff Hostetler	Fr
TE	85	Vyto Kab	So
TE	90	Ron LaPointe	Sr
RB	38	Mike Meade	So
RB	48	Booker Moore	Jr
G	78	Mike Munchak	So
OT	70	Irv Pankey	Sr
QB		Frank Rocco	Fr
C	53	Jim Romano	Jr
TE	80	Brad Scovill	Jr
RB	32	Matt Suhey	Sr
QB	17	Dayle Tate	Jr
WR	13	Kip Vernaglia	Sr
RB	25	Curt Warner	Fr
G	64	John Wojtowicz	Jr

Defense

Pos.	#	Name	Class
DT	86	Jeff Bergstrom	So
DB	30	Matt Bradley	So
DT	96	Frank Case	Jr
DT	54	Bruce Clark	Sr
CB	20	Joel Coles	So
DE	66	Rich D'Amico	Fr
LB	92	Rick Donaldson	Sr
DE	74	Larry Kubin	Jr
DT	57	Pete Kugler	Jr
CB	12	Jon Lebo	So
LB	37	Walker Lee Ashley	Fr
LB	56	Lance Mehl	Sr
DT	60	Matt Millen	Sr
LB	94	Chet Parlavecchio	So
CB	47	Danny Rocco	Fr
LB	89	Carlos Quirch	Sr
S	23	John Walsh	Jr
CB	49	Tom Wise	Jr
DT	61	Leo Wisniewski	So

Special teams

Pos.	#	Name	Class
K	10	Brian Franco	So
P	21	Ralph Giacomarro	Fr
K	31	Herb Menhardt	Jr
LS	97	Brian Hand	Sr

Head coach

- Joe Paterno

Coordinators/assistant coaches

- Dick Anderson
- John Bove
- Booker Brooks
- Fran Ganter
- Bob Phillips
- John Rosenberg
- Jerry Sandusky
- J. T. White
- Jim Williams

Legend

- (C) Team captain
- (S) Suspended
- (I) Ineligible
- Injured
- Redshirt

Roster

== NFL draft ==
Seven Nittany Lions were drafted in the 1980 NFL draft.

Round	Pick	Overall	Name	Position	Team
1st	4	4	Bruce Clark	Defensive tackle	Green Bay Packers
2nd	15	43	Matt Millen	Linebacker	Oakland Raiders
2nd	18	46	Matt Suhey	Running back	Chicago Bears
2nd	22	50	Irv Pankey	Offensive tackle	Los Angeles Rams
3rd	13	69	Lance Mehl	Linebacker	New York Jets
6th	16	154	Mike Guman	Running back	Los Angeles Rams
9th	9	230	Tom Donovan	Wide receiver	Kansas City Chiefs
