= 1979 Pittsburgh Panthers football team =

American college football season

1979 Pittsburgh Panthers football

Fiesta Bowl champion Eastern champion

Fiesta Bowl, W 16–10 vs. Arizona
- Conference: Independent

Ranking
- Coaches: No. 6
- AP: No. 7
- Record: 11–1
- Head coach: Jackie Sherrill (3rd season)
- Offensive coordinator: Wally English (1st season)
- Offensive scheme: West Coast
- Defensive coordinator: Foge Fazio (1st season)
- Base defense: Multiple front
- Home stadium: Pitt Stadium

1979 NCAA Division I-A independents football records
	Conf.					Overall
Team	W		L		T	W		L		T
No. 6 Florida State		–		–		11	–	1	–	0
No. 7 Pittsburgh		–		–		11	–	1	–	0
UNLV		–		–		9	–	1	–	2
No. 17 Temple		–		–		10	–	2	–	0
Tulane		–		–		9	–	3	–	0
Rutgers		–		–		8	–	3	–	0
Tennessee State		–		–		8	–	3	–	0
East Carolina		–		–		7	–	3	–	1
No. 20 Penn State		–		–		8	–	4	–	0
South Carolina		–		–		8	–	4	–	0
Navy		–		–		7	–	4	–	0
Notre Dame		–		–		7	–	4	–	0
Southern Miss		–		–		6	–	4	–	1
Syracuse		–		–		7	–	5	–	0
Colgate		–		–		5	–	4	–	1
Boston College		–		–		5	–	6	–	0
Holy Cross		–		–		5	–	6	–	0
Memphis State		–		–		5	–	6	–	0
Miami (FL)		–		–		5	–	6	–	0
North Texas State		–		–		5	–	6	–	0
Villanova		–		–		5	–	6	–	0
Virginia Tech		–		–		5	–	6	–	0
West Virginia		–		–		5	–	6	–	0
Georgia Tech		–		–		4	–	6	–	1
Louisville		–		–		4	–	6	–	1
William & Mary		–		–		4	–	7	–	0
Illinois State		–		–		3	–	8	–	0
Northeast Louisiana		–		–		3	–	8	–	0
Army		–		–		2	–	8	–	1
Air Force		–		–		2	–	9	–	0
Cincinnati		–		–		2	–	9	–	0
Richmond		–		–		0	–	11	–	0
Rankings from AP Poll

The 1979 Pittsburgh Panthers football team represented the University of Pittsburgh as an independent during the 1979 NCAA Division I-A football season. The Panthers competed in the Fiesta Bowl and were awarded the Lambert-Meadowlands Trophy as the champion of the East.

== Schedule ==
In the Backyard Brawl, Pittsburgh was led by true freshman quarterback Dan Marino, making his second collegiate start. He directed Pitt to a 24–17 victory in the last college football game played at old Mountaineer Field.

Date	Time	Opponent	Rank	Site	TV	Result	Attendance	Source
September 15	1:30 p.m.	Kansas	No. 16	Pitt Stadium; Pittsburgh, PA		W 24–0	41,545	
September 22	1:00 p.m.	at North Carolina	No. 13	Kenan Memorial Stadium; Chapel Hill, NC		L 7–17	50,500	
September 29	7:30 p.m.	at Temple		Veterans Stadium; Philadelphia, PA		W 10–9	34,039	
October 6	1:30 p.m.	Boston College		Pitt Stadium; Pittsburgh, PA		W 28–7	37,146	
October 13	10:00 a.m.	Cincinnati^{†}		Pitt Stadium; Pittsburgh, PA (River City Rivalry)		W 35–0	31,620	
October 20	4:30 p.m.	at No. 12 Washington	No. 17	Husky Stadium; Seattle, WA		W 26–14	52,485	
October 27	1:30 p.m.	No. 17 Navy	No. 12	Pitt Stadium; Pittsburgh, PA		W 24–7	51,332	
November 3	12:30 p.m.	Syracuse	No. 12	Pitt Stadium; Pittsburgh, PA (rivalry)	ABC	W 28–21	43,500	
November 10	1:30 p.m.	at West Virginia	No. 12	Mountaineer Field; Morgantown, WV (Backyard Brawl)		W 24–17	38,681	
November 17	1:30 p.m.	at Army	No. 11	Michie Stadium; West Point, NY		W 40–0	31,689	
December 1	12:30 p.m.	at No. 20 Penn State	No. 11	Beaver Stadium; University Park, PA (rivalry)	ABC	W 29–14	76,958	
December 25	3:30 p.m.	vs. Arizona	No. 10	Sun Devil Stadium; Tempe, AZ (Fiesta Bowl)	NBC	W 16–10	55,347	
^{†}Homecoming; Rankings from AP Poll released prior to the game; All times are in Eastern time

== Roster ==
1979 Pittsburgh Panthers football team roster
Players
Coaches
Offense

Pos.	#	Name	Class
G	70	Emil Boures	So
WR	20	Willie Collier	Sr
QB	7	Dan Daniels	Fr
WR	80	Julius Dawkins	Fr
C	56	Russ Grimm	Jr
OT	64	Bob Gruber	Sr
RB	12	Artrell Hawkins	Jr
QB	13	Dan Marino	Fr
OT	73	Mark May	Jr
RB	40	Randy McMillan	Jr
WR	81	Cliff Moore	Sr
TE	84	Benjie Pryor	Jr
C	60	Terry Quinn	So
WR	88	Ralph Still	Sr
QB	8	Rick Trocano	Jr

Defense

Pos.	#	Name	Class
DT	68	Jerry Boyarsky	Jr
DT	98	Jimbo Covert	So
DE	99	Hugh Green	Jr
DB	36	Jo Jo Heath	Sr
DE	87	Rickey Jackson	Jr
LB	59	Charles "Yogi" Jones	So
LB	55	Rich Kraynak	Fr
DB	26	Tim Lewis	Fr
DT	86	Greg Meisner	Jr
DT	76	Bill Neill	Jr
LB	63	Dave Puzzuoli	Fr
S	29	Dan Short	Fr
LB	66	Sal Sunseri	So
CB	3	Lynn Thomas	Jr
DB	6	Al Wenglikowski	Fr
SS	48	Carlton Williamson	Jr

Special teams

Pos.	#	Name	Class
K	5	Mark Schubert	Sr
K	1	David Trout	Jr

Head coach

- Jackie Sherrill (3rd year)

Coordinators/assistant coaches

Legend

- (C) Team captain
- (S) Suspended
- (I) Ineligible
- Injured
- Redshirt

Roster

== Coaching staff ==
1979 Pittsburgh Panthers football staff
Coaching staff: Jackie Sherrill – Head coach; Jimmy Sharpe – Assistant head coach/offensive line; Wally English – Offensive coordinator/Receivers; Foge Fazio – Defensive coordinator/linebackers; Ron Dickerson – Defensive backs; Bob Matey – Defensive line; Joe Moore – Offensive backs; Joe Pendry – Quarterbacks; Ray Zingler – Defensive ends	Support staff: Alex Kramer – Executive Assistant; Kevin Dickey – Recruiting coordinator; Nick Gasparato – Graduate assistant; Jerry Leith – Graduate assistant; Nick Rapone – Graduate assistant	Strength and conditioning staff: Paul Stark – Weight, Strength Coach

== Team players drafted into the NFL ==
Player	Position	Round	Pick	NFL club
Jo Jo Heath	Defensive back	6	141	Cincinnati Bengals
Bob Gruber	Tackle	10	276	Los Angeles Rams
