= 1979 LSU Tigers football team =

American college football season

1979 LSU Tigers football

Tangerine Bowl, W 34–10 vs. Wake Forest
- Conference: Southeastern Conference
- Record: 7–5 (4–2 SEC)
- Head coach: Charles McClendon (18th season)
- Home stadium: Tiger Stadium

1979 Southeastern Conference football standings
	Conf.					Overall
Team	W		L		T	W		L		T
No. 1 Alabama $	6	–	0	–	0	12	–	0	–	0
Georgia	5	–	1	–	0	6	–	5	–	0
No. 16 Auburn	4	–	2	–	0	8	–	3	–	0
LSU	4	–	2	–	0	7	–	5	–	0
Tennessee	3	–	3	–	0	7	–	5	–	0
Kentucky	3	–	3	–	0	5	–	6	–	0
Ole Miss	3	–	3	–	0	4	–	7	–	0
Mississippi State	2	–	4	–	0	3	–	8	–	0
Vanderbilt	0	–	6	–	0	1	–	10	–	0
Florida	0	–	6	–	0	0	–	10	–	1
$ – Conference champion; Rankings from AP Poll

The 1979 LSU Tigers football team represented Louisiana State University (LSU) as a member of the Southeastern Conference (SEC) during the 1979 NCAA Division I-A football season. Led by 18th-year head coach Charles McClendon, the Tigers compiled an overall record of 7–5, with a mark of 4–2 in conference play, and finished tied for third in the SEC.

Bo Rein, who led NC State to the 1979 Atlantic Coast Conference championship, was hired six days after the regular season finale, but McClendon and his staff coached the Tangerine Bowl vs. Wake Forest. Rein perished in a bizarre plane crash January 10, 1980, only 42 days after his hiring and was succeeded by former LSU All-American Jerry Stovall.

== Schedule ==
Date	Opponent	Rank	Site	TV	Result	Attendance	Source
September 15	at Colorado*		Folsom Field; Boulder, CO		W 44–0	46,642	
September 22	Rice*		Tiger Stadium; Baton Rouge, LA		W 47–3	74,934	
September 29	No. 1 USC*	No. 20	Tiger Stadium; Baton Rouge, LA		L 12–17	78,322	
October 6	Florida	No. 17	Tiger Stadium; Baton Rouge, LA (rivalry)		W 20–3	73,073	
October 13	at Georgia	No. 13	Sanford Stadium; Athens, GA		L 14–21	61,000	
October 20	Kentucky		Tiger Stadium; Baton Rouge, LA		W 23–19	71,296	
October 27	No. 8 Florida State*^{†}		Tiger Stadium; Baton Rouge, LA	ABC	L 19–24	67,167	
November 3	at Ole Miss		Mississippi Veterans Memorial Stadium; Jackson, MS (rivalry)		W 28–24	45,548	
November 10	No. 1 Alabama		Tiger Stadium; Baton Rouge, LA (rivalry)		L 0–3	73,708	
November 17	Mississippi State		Tiger Stadium; Baton Rouge, LA (rivalry)		W 21–3	69,454	
November 24	at No. 18 Tulane*		Louisiana Superdome; New Orleans, LA (Battle for the Rag)	ABC	L 13–24	73,496	
December 22	vs. Wake Forest*		Orlando Stadium; Orlando, FL (Tangerine Bowl)	Mizlou	W 34–10	38,666	
*Non-conference game; ^{†}Homecoming; Rankings from AP Poll released prior to the game

== Roster ==
1979 LSU Tigers football team roster
Players
Coaches
Offense

Pos.	#	Name	Class
WR	3	Carlos Carson	Sr
QB	5	Steve Ensminger	Sr
QB	7	Alan Risher	Fr
QB	8	David Woodley	Sr
RB	9	LeRoid Jones	Sr
WR	21	Tracy Porter	Jr
WR	32	Orlando McDaniel	So
TE	89	Greg LaFleur	Jr

Defense

Pos.	#	Name	Class
CB	11	James Britt	So
S	22	Chris Williams	Jr
CB	37	Willie Teal	Sr
LB	51	Albert Richardson	Fr
DE	86	John Adams	Sr
LB	94	Lyman White	Jr

Special teams

Pos.	#	Name	Class

Head coach

- Charles McClendon

Coordinators/assistant coaches

Legend

- (C) Team captain
- (S) Suspended
- (I) Ineligible
- Injured
- Redshirt

Roster
