= Jimmy Streater =

American gridiron football player (1957–2004)

Profile
- Position: Quarterback

Personal information
- Born: December 17, 1957; Sylva, North Carolina, U.S.
- Died: February 20, 2004 (aged 46); Asheville, North Carolina, U.S.

Career information
- College: Tennessee

Career history
- 1980: Toronto Argonauts

Awards and highlights
- First-team All-SEC (1979)

Career statistics
- TD–INT: 2–2
- Passing yards: 141

Willis James Streater III (December 17, 1957 – February 20, 2004) was an American professional football quarterback in the Canadian Football League (CFL). He played for the Toronto Argonauts in the 1980 season. Streater played college football at Tennessee.
