= Steadman S. Shealy =

American football player and attorney (born 1958)

Member of the Alabama State Board of Education from the 2nd district
- In office January 4, 1987 – January 3, 1995
- Preceded by: ???
- Succeeded by: G. J. Higginbotham

Steadman S. Shealy Jr. (born June 8, 1958) is an American attorney and former college football quarterback. He is best known as the starting quarterback on the University of Alabama's 1979 national championship team. Shealy was also a member of the 1978 national championship team, but played back-up to Jeff Rutledge. After his collegiate career he was twice elected to the Alabama State Board of Education in 1986 and 1990 as a Democrat.

Shealy is a lifelong resident of Dothan, Alabama. After graduating from high school in 1976, he played football on a scholarship for coach Bear Bryant at the University of Alabama. Shealy was a Wishbone formation quarterback for the Tide from 1976 to 1979. He was part of Alabama's 28 consecutive wins—the longest win streak in school history—from 1978 to 1980. He graduated with a Bachelor of Science degree in 1980. Shealy hosted The Bear Bryant Show in 1982 and served as a graduate assistant in the football program while attending law school. He received his Juris Doctor degree from the University of Alabama School of Law in 1984.

Shealy joined the Dothan law firm of Buntin & Cobb as an associate in 1984. Today he is a senior partner in the firm, which is now known as Shealy, Crum & Pike, P.C. He practices civil litigation with an emphasis on insurance, corporate defense, personal injury, and product liability. Shealy and his wife, Ann, have five children, Steadman Jr., Jacqueline, Anna Katherine, Robert, and John David.

== See also ==
- Alabama Crimson Tide football yearly statistical leaders
