= 1979 NCAA Division I-A football rankings =

- Season: 1979
- Bowl season: 1979–80 bowl games
- Preseason No. 1: USC
- End of season champions: Alabama

Two human polls comprised the 1979 National Collegiate Athletic Association (NCAA) Division I-A football rankings. Unlike most sports, college football's governing body, the NCAA, does not bestow a national championship, instead that title is bestowed by one or more different polling agencies. There are two main weekly polls that begin in the preseason—the AP Poll and the Coaches Poll.

== Legend ==
	Increase in ranking
	Decrease in ranking
	Not ranked previous week
	National champion
(#–#)	Win–loss record
(Italics)	Number of first place votes
т	Tied with team above or below also with this symbol

== AP Poll ==
	Preseason Preseason	Week 1 Sep 10	Week 2 Sep 17	Week 3 Sep 24	Week 4 Oct 1	Week 5 Oct 8	Week 6 Oct 15	Week 7 Oct 22	Week 8 Oct 29	Week 9 Nov 5	Week 10 Nov 12	Week 11 Nov 19	Week 12 Nov 26	Week 13 Dec 3	Week 14 (Final) Final	
1.	USC (47)	USC (1–0)	USC (2–0)	USC (3–0)	USC (4–0)	USC (5–0)	Alabama (5–0)	Alabama (6–0)	Alabama (7–0)	Alabama (8–0)	Alabama (9–0)	Alabama (10–0)	Alabama (10–0)	Ohio State (11–0)	Alabama (12–0) (46)	1.
2.	Alabama (11)	Alabama (1–0)	Alabama (1–0)	Alabama (2–0)	Alabama (3–0)	Alabama (4–0)	Texas (4–0)	Nebraska (6–0)	Nebraska (7–0)	Nebraska (8–0)	Ohio State (10–0)	Ohio State (11–0)	USC (10–0–1)	Alabama (11–0)	USC (11–0–1) (21)	2.
3.	Oklahoma (4)	Oklahoma (0–0)	Oklahoma (1–0)	Oklahoma (2–0)	Oklahoma (3–0)	Oklahoma (4–0)	Nebraska (5–0)	USC (6–0–1)	USC (7–0–1)	Ohio State (9–0)	Nebraska (9–0)	Nebraska (10–0)	Ohio State (11–0)	USC (10–0–1)	Oklahoma (11–1)	3.
4.	Texas (1)	Texas (0–0)	Texas (0–0)	Texas (1–0)	Texas (2–0)	Texas (3–0)	USC (5–0–1)	Arkansas (6–0) т	Houston (7–0)	USC (8–0–1)	USC (9–0–1)	USC (9–0–1)	Florida State (11–0)	Florida State (11–0)	Ohio State (11–1)	4.
5.	Penn State	Purdue (1–0)	Notre Dame (1–0)	Missouri (3–0)	Nebraska (3–0)	Nebraska (4–0)	Houston (5–0)	Ohio State (7–0) т	Ohio State (8–0)	Houston (8–0)	Florida State (9–0)	Florida State (10–0)	Oklahoma (10–1)	Oklahoma (10–1)	Houston (11–1)	5.
6.	Purdue	Michigan (1–0)	Penn State (1–0)	Nebraska (2–0)	Houston (3–0)	Washington (5–0)	Ohio State (6–0)	Houston (6–0)	Florida State (7–0)	Oklahoma (7–1)	Texas (7–1)	Texas (8–1)	Texas (9–1)	Arkansas (10–1)	Florida State (11–1)	6.
7.	Michigan	Penn State (0–0)	Nebraska (1–0)	Michigan State (3–0)	Washington (4–0)	Houston (4–0)	Florida State (6–0)	Oklahoma (5–1)	Oklahoma (6–1)	Florida State (8–0)	Oklahoma (8–1)	Arkansas (9–1)	Nebraska (10–1)	Nebraska (10–1)	Pittsburgh (11–1)	7.
8.	Nebraska	Nebraska (0–0)	Michigan State (2–0)	Houston (2–0)	Ohio State (4–0)	Ohio State (5–0)	Oklahoma (4–1)	Florida State (6–0)	Texas (5–1)	Texas (6–1)	Arkansas (8–1)	Oklahoma (9–1)	Arkansas (10–1)	Houston (10–1)	Arkansas (10–2)	8.
9.	Notre Dame	Notre Dame (0–0)	Missouri (2–0)	Washington (3–0)	Florida State (4–0)	Florida State (5–0)	Notre Dame (4–1)	Texas (4–1)	Arkansas (6–1)	Arkansas (7–1)	Houston (8–1)	Houston (8–1)	BYU (11–0)	BYU (11–0)	Nebraska (10–2)	9.
10.	Michigan State	Michigan State (1–0)	Houston (2–0)	Purdue (2–1)	Notre Dame (2–1)	Notre Dame (3–1)	Arkansas (5–0)	Michigan (6–1)	Michigan (7–1)	Michigan (8–1)	BYU (9–0)	BYU (10–0)	Houston (9–1)	Pittsburgh (10–1)	Purdue (10–2)	10.
11.	Georgia	Missouri (1–0)	Michigan (1–1)	Michigan (2–1)	Michigan (3–1)	Michigan (4–1)	Michigan (5–1)	BYU (6–0)	BYU (7–0)	BYU (8–0)	Pittsburgh (8–1)	Pittsburgh (9–1)	Pittsburgh (10–1)	Texas (9–2)	Washington (9–3)	11.
12.	Missouri	Georgia (0–0)	Washington (2–0)	Florida State (3–0)	Purdue (3–1)	Arkansas (4–0)	Washington (5–1)	Pittsburgh (5–1)	Pittsburgh (6–1)	Pittsburgh (7–1)	Purdue (8–2)	Purdue (9–2)	Purdue (9–2)	Purdue (9–2)	Texas (9–3)	12.
13.	Stanford	Houston (1–0)	Pittsburgh (1–0)	Arkansas (2–0)	Arkansas (3–0)	LSU (3–1)	BYU (5–0)	Auburn (5–1)	Notre Dame (5–2)	Notre Dame (6–2)	Michigan (8–2)	Clemson (8–2)	Washington (8–3)	Washington (8–3)	BYU (11–1)	13.
14.	Texas A&M	Washington (1–0)	Florida State (2–0)	Ohio State (3–0)	NC State (4–0)	North Carolina (4–0)	Auburn (4–1)	Notre Dame (4–2)	Wake Forest (7–1)	Purdue (7–2)	Clemson (7–2)	Auburn (8–2)т	Auburn (8–2)	Michigan (8–3)	Baylor (8–4)	14.
15.	Washington	Ohio State (1–0)	Arkansas (1–0)	Notre Dame (1–1)	Missouri (3–1)	Missouri (3–1)	NC State (5–1)	North Carolina (5–1)	Purdue (6–2)	Washington (7–2)	Auburn (7–2)	Washington (8–3)т	Michigan (8–3)	Tulane (9–2)	North Carolina (8–3–1)	15.
16.	Houston	Pittsburgh (0–0)	Ohio State (2–0)	NC State (3–0)	Michigan State (3–1)	BYU (4–0)	Purdue (4–2)	Purdue (5–2)	Washington (6–2)	Auburn (6–2)	Washington (7–3)	Michigan (8–3)	Tulane (9–2)	South Carolina (8–3)	Auburn (8–3)	16.
17.	Pittsburgh	Arkansas (0–0)	Purdue (1–1)	UCLA (2–1)	LSU (2–1)	NC State (4–1)	Pittsburgh (4–1)	Navy (6–0)	Tennessee (4–2)	Baylor (6–2)	Wake Forest (8–2)	Baylor (7–3)	South Carolina (8–3)	Auburn (8–3)	Temple (10–2)	17.
18.	Arizona State	Florida State (1–0)	SMU (2–0)	Penn State (1–1)	North Carolina (3–0)	Auburn (3–1)	Tennessee (4–1)	Wake Forest (6–1)	North Carolina (5–1–1)	Clemson (6–2)	Temple (8–1)	Tulane (8–2)	Clemson (8–3)	Clemson (8–3)	Michigan (8–4)	18.
19.	Florida State	NC State (1–0)	NC State (2–0)	SMU (3–0)	Tennessee (3–0)	Michigan State (3–2)	North Carolina (4–1)	Tennessee (4–2)	Penn State (5–2)	South Carolina (6–2)	Tennessee (5–3)	South Carolina (7–3)	Penn State (7–4)	Baylor (7–4)	Indiana (8–4)	19.
20.	Arkansas	SMU (1–0)	UCLA (1–1)	LSU (2–0)	BYU (3–0)	Purdue (3–2)	Navy (5–0)	Washington (5–2)	Auburn (5–2)	Wake Forest (7–2)	Baylor (6–3) т; Tulane (8–2) т	Penn State (7–3)	Baylor (7–4)	Temple (9–2)	Penn State (8–4)	20.
	Preseason Preseason	Week 1 Sep 10	Week 2 Sep 17	Week 3 Sep 24	Week 4 Oct 1	Week 5 Oct 8	Week 6 Oct 15	Week 7 Oct 22	Week 8 Oct 29	Week 9 Nov 5	Week 10 Nov 12	Week 11 Nov 19	Week 12 Nov 26	Week 13 Dec 3	Week 14 (Final) Final	
		Dropped: Stanford; Texas A&M; Houston; Arizona State	Dropped: Georgia	Dropped: Pittsburgh	Dropped: UCLA; Penn State; SMU	Dropped: Tennessee	Dropped: LSU; Missouri; Michigan State	Dropped: NC State	Dropped: Navy	Dropped: Tennessee; North Carolina; Penn State	Dropped: Notre Dame; South Carolina	Dropped: Wake Forest; Temple; Tennessee	None	Dropped: Penn State	Dropped: Tulane; South Carolina; Clemson	

== Coaches Poll ==
	Preseason	Week 1 Sep 8	Week 2 Sep 15	Week 3 Sep 22	Week 4 Sep 29	Week 5 Oct 6	Week 6 Oct 13	Week 7 Oct 20	Week 8 Oct 27	Week 9 Nov 3	Week 10 Nov 10	Week 11 Nov 17	Week 12 Nov 24	Week 13 Dec 1	Week 14 (Final) Jan 3	
1.	USC (22)	USC (1–0) (24)	USC (2–0) (33)	USC (3–0) (32)	USC (4–0) (27)	USC (5–0) (25)	Alabama (5–0) (28)	Alabama (6–0) (36)	Alabama (7–0) (33)	Alabama (8–0) (33)	Alabama (9–0) (29)	Alabama (10–0) (32)	Alabama (10–0) (25)	Alabama (11–0) (22)	Alabama (12–0) (28)	1.
2.	Oklahoma (2)	Alabama (1–0) (9)	Alabama (1–0) (5)	Alabama (2–0) (4)	Alabama (3–0) (11)	Alabama (4–0) (8)	Texas (5–0) (9)	Nebraska (6–0) (4)	Nebraska (7–0) (6)	Nebraska (8–0) (5)	Nebraska (9–0) (3)	Nebraska (10–0) (2)	USC (10–0–1) (4)	USC (10–0–1) (4)	USC (11–0–1) (9)	2.
3.	Alabama (4)	Oklahoma (0–0) (3)	Oklahoma (1–0)	Oklahoma (2–0)	Oklahoma (3–0)	Oklahoma (4–0)	Nebraska (5–0) (4)	USC (6–0–1) (2)	Ohio State (8–0)	USC (8–0–1) (3)	Ohio State (10–0) (5)	Ohio State (11–0) (5)	Ohio State (11–0) (3)	Ohio State (11–0) (3)	Oklahoma (11–1) (1)	3.
4.	Texas (4)	Texas (0–0) (1)	Texas (0–0) (1)	Texas (1–0) (2)	Texas (2–0) (2)	Nebraska (4–0) (1)	USC (5–0–1)	Houston (6–0)	Houston (7–0) (1)	Houston (8–0) (1)	USC (9–0–1) (4)	USC (9–0–1) (3)	Oklahoma (10–1)	Florida State (11–0)	Ohio State (11–1)	4.
5.	Penn State (1)	Michigan (1–0)	Notre Dame (1–0)	Nebraska (2–0)	Nebraska (3–0) (1)	Texas (3–0) (1)	Houston (5–0)	Arkansas (6–0)	USC (7–0–1)	Ohio State (9–0)	Florida State (9–0) (1)	Florida State (10–0)	Florida State (11–0)	Oklahoma (10–1)	Houston (11–1)	5.
6.	Michigan	Penn State (0–0)	Penn State (1–0)	Michigan State (3–0)	Houston (3–0)	Houston (4–0)	Ohio State (6–0)	Ohio State (7–0)	Florida State (7–0)	Florida State (8–0)	Texas (7–1)	Texas (8–1)	Texas (9–1)	Houston (10–1)	Pittsburgh (11–1)	6.
7.	Nebraska	Purdue (1–0) (1)	Nebraska (1–0)	Missouri (3–0)	Washington (4–0)	Washington (5–0)	Florida State (6–0)	Florida State (6–0)	Oklahoma (6–1)	Oklahoma (8–1)	Oklahoma (8–1)	Oklahoma (9–1)	Arkansas (10–1)	Arkansas (10–1)	Nebraska (10–2)	7.
8.	Purdue (1)	Nebraska (0–0)	Michigan State (2–0)	Houston (2–0)	Ohio State (4–0)	Ohio State (5–0)	Oklahoma (4–1)	Texas (4–1)	Texas (5–1)	Texas (6–1)	Houston (8–1)	Arkansas (9–1)	Nebraska (10–1)	Nebraska (10–1)	Florida State (11–1)	8.
9.	Notre Dame	Houston (1–0)	Houston (2–0)	Washington (3–0)	Notre Dame (2–1)	Notre Dame (3–1)	Notre Dame (4–1)	Oklahoma (5–1)	Arkansas (6–1)	Arkansas (7–1)	Arkansas (8–1)	Houston (8–1)	Houston (9–1)	BYU (11–0)	Arkansas (10–2)	9.
10.	Michigan State	Michigan State (1–0)	Washington (2–0)	Florida State (3–0)	Florida State (4–0)	Florida State (5–0)	Arkansas (5–0)	Michigan (6–1)	Michigan (7–1)	Michigan (8–1)	BYU (9–0)	BYU (10–0)	BYU (11–0) (1)	Pittsburgh (10–1)	Purdue (10–2)	10.
11.	Houston	Notre Dame (0–0)	Missouri (2–0)	Ohio State (3–0)	Arkansas (3–0)	Michigan (4–1)	Michigan (5–1)	BYU (6–0)	BYU (7–0)	BYU (8–0)	Pittsburgh (8–1)	Pittsburgh (9–1)	Pittsburgh (9–1)	Texas (9–2)	Washington (10–2)	11.
12.	Missouri	Missouri (1–0)	Michigan (1–1)	Purdue (2–1)	Michigan (3–1)	LSU (3–1)	Washington (5–1)	Pittsburgh (5–1)	Pittsburgh (6–1)	Pittsburgh (7–1)	Purdue (8–2)	Purdue (9–2)	Purdue (9–2)	Purdue (9–2)	BYU (11–1)	12.
13.	Washington	Washington (1–0)	Pittsburgh (1–0)	Michigan (2–1)	Purdue (3–1)	Arkansas (4–0)	BYU (4–1)	North Carolina (5–1)	Notre Dame (5–2)	Notre Dame (6–2)	Michigan (8–2)	Clemson (8–2)	Washington (9–2)	Washington (9–2)	Texas (9–3)	13.
14.	Georgia	Georgia (0–0)	Florida State (2–0)	Arkansas (2–0)	LSU (2–1)	North Carolina (4–0)	Pittsburgh (4–1)	Navy (6–0)	Wake Forest (7–1)	Washington (7–2)	Clemson (7–2)	Washington (9–2)	Michigan (8–3)	Michigan (8–3)	North Carolina (8–3–1)	14.
15.	Florida State	Pittsburgh (0–0)	Ohio State (2–0)	LSU (2–0)	NC State (4–0)	Missouri (3–1)	Purdue (4–2)	Notre Dame (4–2)	Washington (6–2)	Purdue (7–2)	Washington (7–3)	Michigan (8–3)	Tulane (9–2)	Tulane (9–2)	Baylor (8–4)	15.
16.	Pittsburgh	Ohio State (1–0)	Arkansas (1–0)	Notre Dame (1–1)	North Carolina (3–0)	BYU (4–0)	Navy (5–0)	Purdue (5–2)	Purdue (6–2)	Baylor (6–2)	Temple (8–1)	Baylor (7–3)	South Carolina (8–3)	South Carolina (8–3)	Indiana (8–4)	16.
17.	Arkansas	Arkansas (0–0)	LSU (1–0)	UCLA (2–1)	Missouri (3–1)	Pittsburgh (3–1)	NC State (5–1)	LSU (4–2)	North Carolina (5–1–1)	Clemson (6–2)	Wake Forest (8–2)	Tulane (8–2)	Clemson (8–3)	Clemson (8–3)	Temple (10–2)	17.
18.	Ohio State	Florida State (1–0)	UCLA (1–1)	Penn State (1–1)	Michigan State (3–1)	Navy (4–0)	North Carolina (4–1)	Wake Forest (6–1)	Baylor (6–2)	Temple (7–1)	Tennessee (5–3)	LSU (6–4)	Baylor (7–4)	Temple (9–2)	Penn State (8–4)	18.
19.	UCLA	NC State (1–0)	BYU (2–0)	NC State (3–0)	Tennessee (3–0)	NC State (4–1)	Tennessee (4–1)	Penn State (4–2)	Penn State (5–2)	Wake Forest (7–2)	Indiana (7–3)	Indiana (7–4)	Temple (9–2)	Baylor (7–4)	Michigan (8–4)	19.
20.	Texas A&M	BYU (1–0)	NC State (2–0)	North Carolina (2–0)	BYU (3–0)	Mississippi State (2–2)	LSU (3–2)	Baylor (5–2)	LSU (4–3)	LSU (5–3)	Baylor (6–3)	NC State (7–4)	Penn State (7–3)	Penn State (7–4)	Missouri (7–5)	20.
	Preseason	Week 1 Sep 8	Week 2 Sep 15	Week 3 Sep 22	Week 4 Sep 29	Week 5 Oct 6	Week 6 Oct 13	Week 7 Oct 20	Week 8 Oct 27	Week 9 Nov 3	Week 10 Nov 10	Week 11 Nov 17	Week 12 Nov 24	Week 13 Dec 1	Week 14 (Final) Jan 3	
		Dropped: UCLA; Texas A&M	Dropped: Purdue; Georgia	Dropped: Pittsburgh; BYU	Dropped: UCLA; Penn State	Dropped: Purdue; Michigan State; Tennessee	Dropped: Missouri; Mississippi State	Dropped: Washington; NC State; Tennessee	Dropped: Navy	Dropped: North Carolina; Penn State	Dropped: Notre Dame; LSU	Dropped: Temple; Wake Forest; Tennessee	Dropped: LSU; Indiana; NC State	None	Dropped: Tulane; South Carolina; Clemson	
