= 1979 Virginia Cavaliers football team =

American college football season

1979 Virginia Cavaliers football
- Conference: Atlantic Coast Conference
- Record: 6–5 (1–4 ACC)
- Head coach: Dick Bestwick (4th season)
- Captains: Steve Potter; Michael Newhall
- Home stadium: Scott Stadium

1979 Atlantic Coast Conference football standings
	Conf.					Overall
Team	W		L		T	W		L		T
NC State $	5	–	1	–	0	7	–	4	–	0
Clemson	4	–	2	–	0	8	–	4	–	0
Maryland	4	–	2	–	0	7	–	4	–	0
Wake Forest	3	–	2	–	0	8	–	4	–	0
No. 15 North Carolina	3	–	3	–	0	8	–	3	–	1
Virginia	1	–	4	–	0	6	–	5	–	0
Duke	0	–	6	–	0	2	–	8	–	1
$ – Conference champion; Rankings from AP Poll

The 1979 Virginia Cavaliers football team represented the University of Virginia during the 1979 NCAA Division I-A football season. The Cavaliers were led by fourth-year head coach Dick Bestwick and played their home games at Scott Stadium in Charlottesville, Virginia. They competed as members of the Atlantic Coast Conference, finishing in sixth.

== Schedule ==
Date	Time	Opponent	Site	Result	Attendance	Source
September 8	1:30 p.m.	Richmond*	Scott Stadium; Charlottesville, VA	W 31–0	29,673	
September 15	7:00 p.m.	at No. 19 NC State	Carter–Finley Stadium; Raleigh, NC	L 27–31	45,800	
September 22	1:30 p.m.	VMI*	Scott Stadium; Charlottesville, VA	W 19–0	24,872	
September 29	1:30 p.m.	Duke^{†}	Scott Stadium; Charlottesville, VA	W 30–12	26,947	
October 6	1:00 p.m.	at Clemson	Memorial Stadium; Clemson, SC	L 7–17	62,310	
October 13	1:30 p.m.	James Madison*	Scott Stadium; Charlottesville, VA	W 69–9	18,447	
October 20	2:00 p.m.	at No. 20 Navy*	Navy–Marine Corps Memorial Stadium; Annapolis, MD	L 10–17	22,604	
November 3	1:30 p.m.	at Georgia*	Sanford Stadium; Athens, GA	W 31–0	59,100	
November 10	1:35 p.m.	Virginia Tech*	Scott Stadium; Charlottesville, VA (rivalry)	W 20–18	38,847	
November 17	1:30 p.m.	North Carolina	Scott Stadium; Charlottesville, VA (rivalry)	L 7–13	31,472	
November 24	1:35 p.m.	at Maryland	Byrd Stadium; College Park, MD (rivalry)	L 7–17	26,071	
*Non-conference game; ^{†}Homecoming; Rankings from AP Poll released prior to the game

== Roster ==
1979 Virginia Cavaliers football team roster
Players
Coaches
Offense

Pos.	#	Name	Class
WR	17	Louis Collins	Sr
RB	34	Eric Fears	Fr
WR	21	Andre Grier	Sr
TE	85	Gary Gomolak	Sr
RB	26	David Hall	Jr
FB	29	Will Hummel	So
QB	4	Todd Kirtley	So
OT	78	Ron Kort	Jr
QB	9	Bob Leone	Fr
RB		Howard Lewis
QB	8	Ted Manly	Jr
WR	82	Ted Marchibroda	Sr
FB	44	Vince Mattox	Sr
G	79	Dan McKillican	Jr
WR	81	Tim Moon	Sr
OT	50	Jeff Morrow	Jr
C	53	Brian Musselman	Jr
TE	87	Mike Newhall	Sr
G	60	Kurt Pierce	Jr
QB	16	Rich Riccardi	Fr
FB	32	Mark Sanford	So
OT	54	Mike Sewak	Jr
RB	2	Greg Taylor	Jr
RB	22	Tommy Vigorito	Jr
G	59	Andy Voss	Sr
RB	45	Quentin Walker	Fr
QB	10	Gordie Whitehead	Fr

Defense

Pos.	#	Name	Class
DL	57	Kelvin Anderson	Sr
DT	99	Stuart Anderson	So
SS	31	Tony Blount	Sr
FS	28	Mike Brancati	Sr
DL	72	Mike Budd	So
CB	27	Bobby Call	Jr
FS	40	Pat Chester	So
LB	38	Bryan Coleman	Sr
LB	80	Bryan Holoman	So
DT	94	Grant Hudson	Sr
LB	65	Jim Hyson	Fr
LB	66	Mark LaNeve	Jr
CB	7	Sean McCall	So
DE	91	Quentin Murray	Jr
LB	55	Ken Newsome	Jr
DT	75	Dan Popowski	Fr
LB	90	Steve Potter	Sr
DT	76	Dave Sullivan	Fr
CB	12	Bryan Shumock	Jr
CB	46	Darryl Smith	Fr
SS	13	Jon Tenuta	So
DB		Kevin Turner
DT	86	Craig Wolf	Fr

Special teams

Pos.	#	Name	Class
K	1	Wayne Morrison	Fr
P	14	Ford Mays	So

Head coach

- Dick Bestwick

Coordinators/assistant coaches

Legend

- (C) Team captain
- (S) Suspended
- (I) Ineligible
- Injured
- Redshirt
