= 1979 Illinois State Redbirds football team =

American college football season

1979 Illinois State Redbirds football
- Conference: Independent
- Record: 3–8
- Head coach: Charlie Cowdrey (3rd season)
- MVP: Bill Fenn
- Home stadium: Hancock Stadium

1979 NCAA Division I-A independents football records
	Conf.					Overall
Team	W		L		T	W		L		T
No. 6 Florida State		–		–		11	–	1	–	0
No. 7 Pittsburgh		–		–		11	–	1	–	0
UNLV		–		–		9	–	1	–	2
No. 17 Temple		–		–		10	–	2	–	0
Tulane		–		–		9	–	3	–	0
Rutgers		–		–		8	–	3	–	0
Tennessee State		–		–		8	–	3	–	0
East Carolina		–		–		7	–	3	–	1
No. 20 Penn State		–		–		8	–	4	–	0
South Carolina		–		–		8	–	4	–	0
Navy		–		–		7	–	4	–	0
Notre Dame		–		–		7	–	4	–	0
Southern Miss		–		–		6	–	4	–	1
Syracuse		–		–		7	–	5	–	0
Colgate		–		–		5	–	4	–	1
Boston College		–		–		5	–	6	–	0
Holy Cross		–		–		5	–	6	–	0
Memphis State		–		–		5	–	6	–	0
Miami (FL)		–		–		5	–	6	–	0
North Texas State		–		–		5	–	6	–	0
Villanova		–		–		5	–	6	–	0
Virginia Tech		–		–		5	–	6	–	0
West Virginia		–		–		5	–	6	–	0
Georgia Tech		–		–		4	–	6	–	1
Louisville		–		–		4	–	6	–	1
William & Mary		–		–		4	–	7	–	0
Illinois State		–		–		3	–	8	–	0
Northeast Louisiana		–		–		3	–	8	–	0
Army		–		–		2	–	8	–	1
Air Force		–		–		2	–	9	–	0
Cincinnati		–		–		2	–	9	–	0
Richmond		–		–		0	–	11	–	0
Rankings from AP Poll

The 1979 Illinois State Redbirds football team represented Illinois State University as an independent during the 1979 NCAA Division I-A football season. Led by third-year head coach Charlie Cowdrey, the Redbirds compiled a record of 3–8. Illinois State played home games at Hancock Stadium in Normal, Illinois.

== Schedule ==
Date	Opponent	Site	Result	Attendance	Source
September 8	at Youngstown State	Stambaugh Stadium; Youngstown, OH	L 27–33	6,012	
September 15	Fort Hays State	Hancock Stadium; Normal, IL	W 35–7	4,753	
September 22	Eastern Michigan	Hancock Stadium; Normal, IL	W 24–15	4,949	
September 29	at No. T–4 North Dakota	Memorial Stadium; Grand Forks, ND	L 0–20	5,700	
October 6	at Southern Illinois	McAndrew Stadium; Carbondale, IL	L 0–7	8,100	
October 13	at Ball State	Ball State Stadium; Muncie, IN	L 14–42	18,136	
October 20	Northern Illinois	Hancock Stadium; Normal, IL	L 7–33	2,921	
October 27	at Indiana State	Memorial Stadium; Terre Haute, IN	L 21–23	14,117	
November 3	Western Illinois^{†}	Hancock Stadium; Normal, IL	W 35–7	13,397	
November 10	Eastern Illinois	Hancock Stadium; Normal, IL (rivalry)	L 0–24	10,272	
November 17	Chattanooga	Hancock Stadium; Normal, IL	L 31–42	2,742	
^{†}Homecoming; Rankings from AP Poll released prior to the game

== Roster ==
1979 Illinois State Redbirds football team roster
Players			Coaches
Offense: Pos. / # / Name / Class; QB / 7 / Bruce Monaghan / Sr	Defense: Pos. / # / Name / Class; S / 8 / Jeff George / Sr	Special teams: Pos. / # / Name / Class	Head coach: Charlie Cowdrey; Coordinators/assistant coaches Legend: (C) Team captain; (S) Suspended; (I) Ineligible; Injured; Redshirt
