= 1979 Air Force Falcons football team =

American college football season

1979 Air Force Falcons football
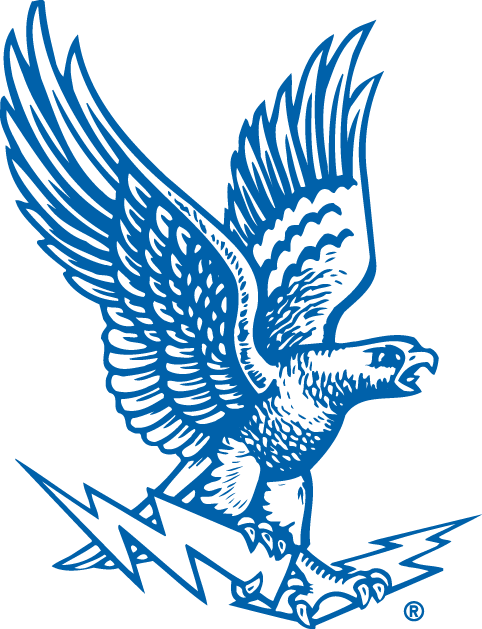
- Conference: Independent
- Record: 2–9
- Head coach: Ken Hatfield (1st season)
- Offensive scheme: Wishbone triple option
- Defensive coordinator: Al Groh (2nd season)
- Base defense: 3–4
- Captains: Randy Williams; Dave Ziebart
- Home stadium: Falcon Stadium

1979 NCAA Division I-A independents football records
	Conf.					Overall
Team	W		L		T	W		L		T
No. 6 Florida State		–		–		11	–	1	–	0
No. 7 Pittsburgh		–		–		11	–	1	–	0
UNLV		–		–		9	–	1	–	2
No. 17 Temple		–		–		10	–	2	–	0
Tulane		–		–		9	–	3	–	0
Rutgers		–		–		8	–	3	–	0
Tennessee State		–		–		8	–	3	–	0
East Carolina		–		–		7	–	3	–	1
No. 20 Penn State		–		–		8	–	4	–	0
South Carolina		–		–		8	–	4	–	0
Navy		–		–		7	–	4	–	0
Notre Dame		–		–		7	–	4	–	0
Southern Miss		–		–		6	–	4	–	1
Syracuse		–		–		7	–	5	–	0
Colgate		–		–		5	–	4	–	1
Boston College		–		–		5	–	6	–	0
Holy Cross		–		–		5	–	6	–	0
Memphis State		–		–		5	–	6	–	0
Miami (FL)		–		–		5	–	6	–	0
North Texas State		–		–		5	–	6	–	0
Villanova		–		–		5	–	6	–	0
Virginia Tech		–		–		5	–	6	–	0
West Virginia		–		–		5	–	6	–	0
Georgia Tech		–		–		4	–	6	–	1
Louisville		–		–		4	–	6	–	1
William & Mary		–		–		4	–	7	–	0
Illinois State		–		–		3	–	8	–	0
Northeast Louisiana		–		–		3	–	8	–	0
Army		–		–		2	–	8	–	1
Air Force		–		–		2	–	9	–	0
Cincinnati		–		–		2	–	9	–	0
Richmond		–		–		0	–	11	–	0
Rankings from AP Poll

The 1979 Air Force Falcons football team represented the United States Air Force Academy in the 1979 NCAA Division I-A football season, their last as an Independent. Led by first–year head coach Ken Hatfield, Air Force played home games at Falcon Stadium in Colorado Springs, Colorado.

The Falcons lost their first eight games, then won two of three to finish at 2–9, and were outscored 127–253. The win over Army on November 3 broke an eleven-game losing streak.

Air Force joined the Western Athletic Conference in 1980.

== Schedule ==
Date	Opponent	Site	Result	Attendance	Source
September 8	Tulsa	Falcon Stadium; Colorado Springs, CO	L 7–24	23,000	
September 15	at Wisconsin	Camp Randall Stadium; Madison, WI	L 0–38	66,466	
September 22	Illinois	Falcon Stadium; Colorado Springs, CO	L 19–27	18,178	
September 29	Kansas State	Falcon Stadium; Colorado Springs, CO	L 6–19	22,200	
October 6	at Navy	Navy–Marine Corps Memorial Stadium; Annapolis, MD (Commander-in-Chief's Trophy)	L 7–24	31,109	
October 13	No. 10 Notre Dame	Falcon Stadium; Colorado Springs, CO (rivalry)	L 13–38	34,881	
October 20	at Oregon	Autzen Stadium; Eugene, OR	L 9–17	28,457	
October 27	at Colorado State	Hughes Stadium; Fort Collins, CO (rivalry)	L 6–20	21,104	
November 3	Army	Falcon Stadium; Colorado Springs, CO (Commander-in-Chief's Trophy)	W 28–7	30,334	
November 10	at Georgia Tech	Grant Field; Atlanta, GA	L 0–21	30,113	
November 17	Vanderbilt	Falcon Stadium; Colorado Springs, CO	W 30–29	15,619	
Rankings from AP Poll released prior to the game

== Roster ==
1979 Air Force Falcons football team roster
Players			Coaches
Offense: Pos. / # / Name / Class	Defense: Pos. / # / Name / Class; S / 17 / Johnny Jackson / So	Special teams: Pos. / # / Name / Class	Head coach: Ken Hatfield (1st year); Coordinators/assistant coaches Legend: (C) Team captain; (S) Suspended; (I) Ineligible; Injured; Redshirt
