= 1979 Northeast Louisiana Indians football team =

American college football season

1979 Northeast Louisiana Indians football
- Conference: Independent
- Record: 3–8
- Head coach: John David Crow (4th season)
- Home stadium: Malone Stadium

1979 NCAA Division I-A independents football records
	Conf.					Overall
Team	W		L		T	W		L		T
No. 6 Florida State		–		–		11	–	1	–	0
No. 7 Pittsburgh		–		–		11	–	1	–	0
UNLV		–		–		9	–	1	–	2
No. 17 Temple		–		–		10	–	2	–	0
Tulane		–		–		9	–	3	–	0
Rutgers		–		–		8	–	3	–	0
Tennessee State		–		–		8	–	3	–	0
East Carolina		–		–		7	–	3	–	1
No. 20 Penn State		–		–		8	–	4	–	0
South Carolina		–		–		8	–	4	–	0
Navy		–		–		7	–	4	–	0
Notre Dame		–		–		7	–	4	–	0
Southern Miss		–		–		6	–	4	–	1
Syracuse		–		–		7	–	5	–	0
Colgate		–		–		5	–	4	–	1
Boston College		–		–		5	–	6	–	0
Holy Cross		–		–		5	–	6	–	0
Memphis State		–		–		5	–	6	–	0
Miami (FL)		–		–		5	–	6	–	0
North Texas State		–		–		5	–	6	–	0
Villanova		–		–		5	–	6	–	0
Virginia Tech		–		–		5	–	6	–	0
West Virginia		–		–		5	–	6	–	0
Georgia Tech		–		–		4	–	6	–	1
Louisville		–		–		4	–	6	–	1
William & Mary		–		–		4	–	7	–	0
Illinois State		–		–		3	–	8	–	0
Northeast Louisiana		–		–		3	–	8	–	0
Army		–		–		2	–	8	–	1
Air Force		–		–		2	–	9	–	0
Cincinnati		–		–		2	–	9	–	0
Richmond		–		–		0	–	11	–	0
Rankings from AP Poll

The 1979 Northeast Louisiana Indians football team was an American football team that represented Northeast Louisiana University (now known as the University of Louisiana at Monroe) as an independent during the 1979 NCAA Division I-A football season. In their fourth year under head coach John David Crow, the team compiled a 3–8 record.

== Schedule ==
Date	Opponent	Site	Result	Attendance	Source
September 1	at Southwestern Louisiana	Cajun Field; Lafayette, LA	L 13–17	19,150	
September 15	Arkansas State	Malone Stadium; Monroe, LA	W 18–17		
September 22	at McNeese State	Cowboy Stadium; Lake Charles, LA	L 10–12	19,860	
September 29	at Northwestern State	Harry Turpin Stadium; Natchitoches, LA (rivalry)	L 14–20	12,989	
October 6	Nicholls State	Malone Stadium; Monroe, LA	L 16–23		
October 13	at Memphis State	Liberty Bowl Memorial Stadium; Memphis, TN	W 21–20	25,494	
October 20	Cal State Fullerton	Malone Stadium; Monroe, LA	W 28–17	15,208	
October 27	at Southeastern Louisiana	Strawberry Stadium; Hammond, LA	L 0–13	7,500	
November 3	Lamar	Malone Stadium; Monroe, LA	L 7–21	9,300	
November 10	at Indiana State	Memorial Stadium; Terre Haute, IN	L 21–38	5,500	
November 17	at Louisiana Tech	Joe Aillet Stadium; Ruston, LA (rivalry)	L 10–13	17,300	

== Roster ==
1979 Northeast Louisiana Indians football team roster
Players
Coaches
Offense

Pos.	#	Name	Class
QB	5	Bud Cespiva	Sr
RB	22	Robbie Green	Fr
OT	61	Joe Kuhn	Sr

Defense

Pos.	#	Name	Class
DB	1	David Dumars	Sr
DB	24	Vic Minor	Sr
DT	83	Ken Poole	Jr
LB	89	Matt Weiss	Jr
DT	60	Jim Whitehead	Jr

Special teams

Pos.	#	Name	Class

Head coach

- John David Crow

Coordinators/assistant coaches

- Norman Joseph (assistant)

Legend

- (C) Team captain
- (S) Suspended
- (I) Ineligible
- Injured
- Redshirt
