= 1979 Villanova Wildcats football team =

American college football season

1979 Villanova Wildcats football
- Conference: Independent
- Record: 5–6
- Head coach: Dick Bedesem (5th season)
- Captain: Paul Columbia
- Home stadium: Villanova Stadium

1979 NCAA Division I-A independents football records
	Conf.					Overall
Team	W		L		T	W		L		T
No. 6 Florida State		–		–		11	–	1	–	0
No. 7 Pittsburgh		–		–		11	–	1	–	0
UNLV		–		–		9	–	1	–	2
No. 17 Temple		–		–		10	–	2	–	0
Tulane		–		–		9	–	3	–	0
Rutgers		–		–		8	–	3	–	0
Tennessee State		–		–		8	–	3	–	0
East Carolina		–		–		7	–	3	–	1
No. 20 Penn State		–		–		8	–	4	–	0
South Carolina		–		–		8	–	4	–	0
Navy		–		–		7	–	4	–	0
Notre Dame		–		–		7	–	4	–	0
Southern Miss		–		–		6	–	4	–	1
Syracuse		–		–		7	–	5	–	0
Colgate		–		–		5	–	4	–	1
Boston College		–		–		5	–	6	–	0
Holy Cross		–		–		5	–	6	–	0
Memphis State		–		–		5	–	6	–	0
Miami (FL)		–		–		5	–	6	–	0
North Texas State		–		–		5	–	6	–	0
Villanova		–		–		5	–	6	–	0
Virginia Tech		–		–		5	–	6	–	0
West Virginia		–		–		5	–	6	–	0
Georgia Tech		–		–		4	–	6	–	1
Louisville		–		–		4	–	6	–	1
William & Mary		–		–		4	–	7	–	0
Illinois State		–		–		3	–	8	–	0
Northeast Louisiana		–		–		3	–	8	–	0
Army		–		–		2	–	8	–	1
Air Force		–		–		2	–	9	–	0
Cincinnati		–		–		2	–	9	–	0
Richmond		–		–		0	–	11	–	0
Rankings from AP Poll

The 1979 Villanova Wildcats football team represented the Villanova University during the 1979 NCAA Division I-A football season. The head coach was Dick Bedesem, coaching his fifth season with the Wildcats. The team played their home games at Villanova Stadium in Villanova, Pennsylvania.

== Schedule ==
Date	Opponent	Site	Result	Attendance	Source
September 9	at Maryland	Byrd Stadium; College Park, MD	L 20–24	31,684	
September 15	UMass	Villanova Stadium; Villanova, PA	W 35–7	8,500	
September 22	at Boston College	Alumni Stadium; Chestnut Hill, MA	L 7–34	16,083	
September 29	at Cincinnati	Nippert Stadium; Cincinnati, OH	L 13–27	14,785	
October 6	Youngstown State	Villanova Stadium; Villanova, PA	L 22–27	4,807	
October 13	No. 1 Delaware	Villanova Stadium; Villanova, PA (rivalry)	L 20–21	14,500	
October 20	Holy Cross^{†}	Villanova Stadium; Villanova, PA	W 29–14	9,700	
October 27	at Marshall	Fairfield Stadium; Huntington, WV	W 24–14		
November 3	at Richmond	City Stadium; Richmond, VA	W 9–3	10,000	
November 17	at Rutgers	Rutgers Stadium; New Brunswick, NJ	W 32–17	19,700	
November 24	Temple	Villanova Stadium; Villanova, PA (Mayor's Cup)	L 10–42		
^{†}Homecoming; Rankings from AP Poll released prior to the game

== Roster ==
1979 Villanova Wildcats football team roster
Players
Coaches
Offense

Pos.	#	Name	Class
OT	51	Joe Arcidiacono	Sr
QB	12	Pat O'Brien	Jr
QB	11	Tom Sharkey	Sr

Defense

Pos.	#	Name	Class
DT	55	Howie Long	Jr
DT	62	Joe Makoid	Jr
DB	49	Don Martin	Jr
DB	28	Pete Pappachristus	Sr

Special teams

Pos.	#	Name	Class
K	17	Chuck Bushbeck	So

Head coach

- Dick Bedesem

Coordinators/assistant coaches

Legend

- (C) Team captain
- (S) Suspended
- (I) Ineligible
- Injured
- Redshirt
