= 1979 Tulane Green Wave football team =

American college football season

1979 Tulane Green Wave football

Liberty Bowl, L 6–9 vs. Penn State
- Conference: Independent
- Record: 9–3
- Head coach: Larry Smith (4th season)
- Defensive coordinator: Moe Ankney (4th season)
- Home stadium: Louisiana Superdome

1979 NCAA Division I-A independents football records
	Conf.					Overall
Team	W		L		T	W		L		T
No. 6 Florida State		–		–		11	–	1	–	0
No. 7 Pittsburgh		–		–		11	–	1	–	0
UNLV		–		–		9	–	1	–	2
No. 17 Temple		–		–		10	–	2	–	0
Tulane		–		–		9	–	3	–	0
Rutgers		–		–		8	–	3	–	0
Tennessee State		–		–		8	–	3	–	0
East Carolina		–		–		7	–	3	–	1
No. 20 Penn State		–		–		8	–	4	–	0
South Carolina		–		–		8	–	4	–	0
Navy		–		–		7	–	4	–	0
Notre Dame		–		–		7	–	4	–	0
Southern Miss		–		–		6	–	4	–	1
Syracuse		–		–		7	–	5	–	0
Colgate		–		–		5	–	4	–	1
Boston College		–		–		5	–	6	–	0
Holy Cross		–		–		5	–	6	–	0
Memphis State		–		–		5	–	6	–	0
Miami (FL)		–		–		5	–	6	–	0
North Texas State		–		–		5	–	6	–	0
Villanova		–		–		5	–	6	–	0
Virginia Tech		–		–		5	–	6	–	0
West Virginia		–		–		5	–	6	–	0
Georgia Tech		–		–		4	–	6	–	1
Louisville		–		–		4	–	6	–	1
William & Mary		–		–		4	–	7	–	0
Illinois State		–		–		3	–	8	–	0
Northeast Louisiana		–		–		3	–	8	–	0
Army		–		–		2	–	8	–	1
Air Force		–		–		2	–	9	–	0
Cincinnati		–		–		2	–	9	–	0
Richmond		–		–		0	–	11	–	0
Rankings from AP Poll

The 1979 Tulane Green Wave football team represented Tulane University in the 1979 NCAA Division I-A football season. The team was led by Larry Smith. The Green Wave played home games in the Louisiana Superdome. The team finished with a record of 9–3 and played in the 1979 Liberty Bowl, losing 6–9 to Penn State.

The offense scored 318 points while the defense allowed 179 points. Two members of the Green Wave team were drafted into the National Football League.

The Wave opened the season by smashing Stanford 33-10, spoiling John Elway's collegiate debut.

In the 77th edition of the Battle for the Rag, Tulane beat LSU 24–13 in what was LSU coach Charles McClendon's final regular season game after 18 seasons.

== Schedule ==
Date	Opponent	Rank	Site	TV	Result	Attendance	Source
September 8	No. 13 Stanford		Louisiana Superdome; New Orleans, LA		W 33–10	41,251	
September 15	at Rice		Rice Stadium; Houston, TX		L 17–21	15,000	
September 22	at TCU		Amon G. Carter Stadium; Fort Worth, TX		W 33–19	15,208	
September 29	No. 19 SMU		Louisiana Superdome; New Orleans, LA		W 24–17	42,563	
October 6	Vanderbilt		Louisiana Superdome; New Orleans, LA		W 42–14	27,873	
October 13	at Southern Miss		M. M. Roberts Stadium; Hattiesburg, MS (rivalry)		W 20–19	30,028	
October 20	at West Virginia		Mountaineer Field; Morgantown, WV		L 17–27	28,303	
October 27	Georgia Tech		Louisiana Superdome; New Orleans, LA		W 12–7	51,963	
November 3	at Boston College		Alumni Stadium; Chestnut Hill, MA		W 43–8	12,236	
November 10	Ole Miss		Louisiana Superdome; New Orleans, LA (rivalry)		W 49–15	45,647	
November 24	LSU	No. 18	Louisiana Superdome; New Orleans, LA (Battle for the Rag)	ABC	W 24–13	73,496	
December 22	vs. Penn State	No. 15	Liberty Bowl Memorial Stadium; Memphis, TN (Liberty Bowl)	ABC	L 6–9	50,021	
Rankings from AP Poll released prior to the game; Source:

== Roster ==
1979 Tulane Green Wave football team roster
Players
Coaches
Offense

Pos.	#	Name	Class
WR	3	Alton Alexis	Sr
QB	12	Nickie Hall	Jr
TE	87	Rodney Holman	So

Defense

Pos.	#	Name	Class
CB	4	Mike Sims
LB	97	Marty Wetzel	Jr

Special teams

Pos.	#	Name	Class
K	9	Eddie Murray	Sr

Head coach

- Larry Smith

Coordinators/assistant coaches

Legend

- (C) Team captain
- (S) Suspended
- (I) Ineligible
- Injured
- Redshirt

== Team players in the NFL ==
Player	Position	Round	Pick	NFL Team
Eddie Murray	Kicker	7	166	Detroit Lions
Alton Alexis	Wide receiver	11	281	Cincinnati Bengals
