= 1979 Louisville Cardinals football team =

American college football season

1979 Louisville Cardinals football
- Conference: Independent
- Record: 4–6–1
- Head coach: Vince Gibson (5th season)
- Home stadium: Fairgrounds Stadium

1979 NCAA Division I-A independents football records
	Conf.					Overall
Team	W		L		T	W		L		T
No. 6 Florida State		–		–		11	–	1	–	0
No. 7 Pittsburgh		–		–		11	–	1	–	0
UNLV		–		–		9	–	1	–	2
No. 17 Temple		–		–		10	–	2	–	0
Tulane		–		–		9	–	3	–	0
Rutgers		–		–		8	–	3	–	0
Tennessee State		–		–		8	–	3	–	0
East Carolina		–		–		7	–	3	–	1
No. 20 Penn State		–		–		8	–	4	–	0
South Carolina		–		–		8	–	4	–	0
Navy		–		–		7	–	4	–	0
Notre Dame		–		–		7	–	4	–	0
Southern Miss		–		–		6	–	4	–	1
Syracuse		–		–		7	–	5	–	0
Colgate		–		–		5	–	4	–	1
Boston College		–		–		5	–	6	–	0
Holy Cross		–		–		5	–	6	–	0
Memphis State		–		–		5	–	6	–	0
Miami (FL)		–		–		5	–	6	–	0
North Texas State		–		–		5	–	6	–	0
Villanova		–		–		5	–	6	–	0
Virginia Tech		–		–		5	–	6	–	0
West Virginia		–		–		5	–	6	–	0
Georgia Tech		–		–		4	–	6	–	1
Louisville		–		–		4	–	6	–	1
William & Mary		–		–		4	–	7	–	0
Illinois State		–		–		3	–	8	–	0
Northeast Louisiana		–		–		3	–	8	–	0
Army		–		–		2	–	8	–	1
Air Force		–		–		2	–	9	–	0
Cincinnati		–		–		2	–	9	–	0
Richmond		–		–		0	–	11	–	0
Rankings from AP Poll

The 1979 Louisville Cardinals football team was an American football team that represented the University of Louisville as an independent during the 1979 NCAA Division I-A football season. In their fifth season under head coach Vince Gibson, the Cardinals compiled a 4–6–1 record and were outscored by a total of 202 to 167.

The team's statistical leaders included Stu Stram with 806 passing yards, Greg Hickman with 648 rushing yards and 24 points scored, and Randy Butler with 347 receiving yards.

== Schedule ==
Date	Opponent	Site	Result	Attendance	Source
September 8	Virginia Tech	Fairgrounds Stadium; Louisville, KY	L 14–15	29,436	
September 15	at Miami (FL)	Miami Orange Bowl; Miami, FL (rivalry)	L 12–24	41,129	
September 22	Cincinnati	Fairgrounds Stadium; Louisville, KY (The Keg of Nails)	W 22–19	20,174	
September 29	at Drake	Drake Stadium; Des Moines, IA	W 31–21	13,155	
October 6	No. 9 Florida State	Fairgrounds Stadium; Louisville, KY	L 0–27	27,306	
October 13	Tulsa	Fairgrounds Stadium; Louisville, KY	W 24–7	14,941	
October 20	at Indiana State	Memorial Stadium; Terre Haute, IN	W 34–10	16,279	
November 3	Southern Miss	Fairgrounds Stadium; Louisville, KY	T 10–10	13,085	
November 10	at Memphis State	Liberty Bowl Memorial Stadium; Memphis, TN (rivalry)	L 6–10	17,205	
November 17	at Maryland	Byrd Stadium; College Park, MD	L 7–28	25,104	
November 25	Rutgers	Fairgrounds Stadium; Louisville, KY	L 7–31	10,152	
Rankings from AP Poll released prior to the game

== Roster ==
1979 Louisville Cardinals football team roster
Players
Coaches
Offense

Pos.	#	Name	Class
WR	20	Mark Clayton	Fr
OT	75	Joe Jacoby	Jr

Defense

Pos.	#	Name	Class
LB	50	Otis Wilson	Sr

Special teams

Pos.	#	Name	Class

Head coach

- Vince Gibson

Coordinators/assistant coaches

Legend

- (C) Team captain
- (S) Suspended
- (I) Ineligible
- Injured
- Redshirt
