= 1979 Temple Owls football team =

American college football season

1979 Temple Owls football

Garden State Bowl, W 28–17 vs. California
- Conference: Independent

Ranking
- Coaches: No. 17
- AP: No. 17
- Record: 10–2
- Head coach: Wayne Hardin (9th season)
- Home stadium: Veterans Stadium, Franklin Field

1979 NCAA Division I-A independents football records
	Conf.					Overall
Team	W		L		T	W		L		T
No. 6 Florida State		–		–		11	–	1	–	0
No. 7 Pittsburgh		–		–		11	–	1	–	0
UNLV		–		–		9	–	1	–	2
No. 17 Temple		–		–		10	–	2	–	0
Tulane		–		–		9	–	3	–	0
Rutgers		–		–		8	–	3	–	0
Tennessee State		–		–		8	–	3	–	0
East Carolina		–		–		7	–	3	–	1
No. 20 Penn State		–		–		8	–	4	–	0
South Carolina		–		–		8	–	4	–	0
Navy		–		–		7	–	4	–	0
Notre Dame		–		–		7	–	4	–	0
Southern Miss		–		–		6	–	4	–	1
Syracuse		–		–		7	–	5	–	0
Colgate		–		–		5	–	4	–	1
Boston College		–		–		5	–	6	–	0
Holy Cross		–		–		5	–	6	–	0
Memphis State		–		–		5	–	6	–	0
Miami (FL)		–		–		5	–	6	–	0
North Texas State		–		–		5	–	6	–	0
Villanova		–		–		5	–	6	–	0
Virginia Tech		–		–		5	–	6	–	0
West Virginia		–		–		5	–	6	–	0
Georgia Tech		–		–		4	–	6	–	1
Louisville		–		–		4	–	6	–	1
William & Mary		–		–		4	–	7	–	0
Illinois State		–		–		3	–	8	–	0
Northeast Louisiana		–		–		3	–	8	–	0
Army		–		–		2	–	8	–	1
Air Force		–		–		2	–	9	–	0
Cincinnati		–		–		2	–	9	–	0
Richmond		–		–		0	–	11	–	0
Rankings from AP Poll

The 1979 Temple Owls football team was an American football team that represented Temple University as an independent during the 1979 NCAA Division I-A football season. In its 10th season under head coach Wayne Hardin, the team compiled a 10–2 record, defeated California in the 1979 Garden State Bowl, outscored all opponents by a total of 399 to 198, and was ranked No. 17 in the final AP and Coaches polls. The team played its home games at Veterans Stadium in Philadelphia.

The team's statistical leaders included Brian Broomell with 2,103 passing yards, Mark Bright with 1,036 rushing yards, and Gerald Lucear with 964 receiving yards and 78 points scored.

== Schedule ==
Date	Opponent	Rank	Site	Result	Attendance	Source
September 8	at West Virginia		Mountaineer Field; Morgantown, WV	W 38–16	34,299	
September 15	Drake		Franklin Field; Philadelphia, PA	W 43–21	10,872	
September 22	at Delaware		Delaware Stadium; Newark, DE	W 31–14	22,068	
September 29	Pittsburgh		Veterans Stadium; Philadelphia, PA	L 9–10	34,039	
October 6	at Rutgers		Rutgers Stadium; New Brunswick, NJ	W 41–20	20,245	
October 13	Syracuse		Veterans Stadium; Philadelphia, PA	W 49–17	18,504	
October 20	Cincinnati		Veterans Stadium; Philadelphia, PA	W 35–14	13,368	
November 3	at Hawaii		Aloha Stadium; Halawa, HI	W 34–31	33,742	
November 10	Akron		Veterans Stadium; Philadelphia, PA	W 42–6	8,398	
November 17	at Penn State	No. 18	Beaver Stadium; University Park, PA	L 7–22	76,000	
November 24	at Villanova		Villanova Stadium; Villanova, PA (rivalry)	W 42–10		
December 15	vs. California*	No. 20	Giants Stadium; East Rutherford, NJ (Garden State Bowl)	W 28–17	40,207	
*Non-conference game; Rankings from AP Poll released prior to the game

== Roster ==
1979 Temple Owls football team roster
Players
Coaches
Offense

Pos.	#	Name	Class
QB	12	Brian Broomell	Sr

Defense

Pos.	#	Name	Class
LB	54	Mike Curcio	Sr
DB	16	Mark McCants	Jr
LB		Mike Fuoco
LB		Jay Gicker
DB/LB		Brett Hardenstine

Special teams

Pos.	#	Name	Class

Head coach

- Wayne Hardin

Coordinators/assistant coaches

Legend

- (C) Team captain
- (S) Suspended
- (I) Ineligible
- Injured
- Redshirt
