= 1979 Wake Forest Demon Deacons football team =

American college football season

1979 Wake Forest Demon Deacons football

Tangerine Bowl, L 10–34 vs. LSU
- Conference: Atlantic Coast Conference
- Record: 8–4 (3–2 ACC)
- Head coach: John Mackovic (2nd season)
- Captains: Syd Kitson; Mark Lancaster; James McDougald; James "Quick" Parker
- Home stadium: Groves Stadium

1979 Atlantic Coast Conference football standings
| | Conf. | | | | | Overall |
| Team | W | | L | | T | W | | L | | T |
|---|---|---|---|---|---|---|---|---|---|---|
| NC State $ | 5 | – | 1 | – | 0 | 7 | – | 4 | – | 0 |
| Clemson | 4 | – | 2 | – | 0 | 8 | – | 4 | – | 0 |
| Maryland | 4 | – | 2 | – | 0 | 7 | – | 4 | – | 0 |
| Wake Forest | 3 | – | 2 | – | 0 | 8 | – | 4 | – | 0 |
| No. 15 North Carolina | 3 | – | 3 | – | 0 | 8 | – | 3 | – | 1 |
| Virginia | 1 | – | 4 | – | 0 | 6 | – | 5 | – | 0 |
| Duke | 0 | – | 6 | – | 0 | 2 | – | 8 | – | 1 |
$ – Conference champion; Rankings from AP Poll

The 1979 Wake Forest Demon Deacons football team was an American football team that represented Wake Forest University during the 1979 NCAA Division I-A football season. In its second season under head coach John Mackovic, the team compiled an 8–4 record, finished in fourth place in the Atlantic Coast Conference, and lost to LSU in the 1979 Tangerine Bowl.

== Schedule ==
| Date | Opponent | Rank | Site | Result | Attendance | Source |
|---|---|---|---|---|---|---|
| September 8 | Appalachian State* | | Groves Stadium; Winston-Salem, NC | W 30–23 | 26,500 | |
| September 15 | at No. 12 Georgia* | | Sanford Stadium; Athens, GA | W 22–21 | 57,500 | |
| September 22 | East Carolina* | | Groves Stadium; Winston-Salem, NC | W 23–20 | 28,751 | |
| September 29 | at No. 16 NC State | | Carter–Finley Stadium; Raleigh, NC (rivalry) | L 14–17 | 44,800 | |
| October 6 | at Virginia Tech* | | Lane Stadium; Blacksburg, VA | W 19–14 | 36,600 | |
| October 13 | at No. 14 North Carolina | | Kenan Memorial Stadium; Chapel Hill, NC (rivalry) | W 24–19 | 50,720 | |
| October 20 | Maryland | | Groves Stadium; Winston-Salem, NC | W 25–17 | 26,050 | |
| October 27 | No. 13 Auburn* | No. 18 | Groves Stadium; Winston-Salem, NC | W 42–38 | 34,060 | |
| November 3 | at Clemson | No. 14 | Memorial Stadium; Clemson, SC | L 0–31 | 59,205 | |
| November 10 | Duke | No. 20 | Groves Stadium; Winston-Salem, NC (rivalry) | W 17–14 | 28,300 | |
| November 17 | at South Carolina* | No. 17 | Williams–Brice Stadium; Columbia, SC | L 14–35 | 56,407 | |
| December 22 | vs. LSU | | Orlando Stadium; Orlando, FL (Tangerine Bowl) | L 10–34 | 38,666 | |
*Non-conference game; Rankings from AP Poll released prior to the game

== Roster ==
1979 Wake Forest Demon Deacons football team roster
Players
Coaches
Offense

| Pos. | # | Name | Class |
|---|---|---|---|
| WR | 1 | Kenny Duckett | Jr |
| QB | 10 | Gary Suchofield | Fr |
| QB | 14 | Jay Venuto | Sr |
| RB | 21 | Albert Kirby | Sr |
| OT | 57 | Rich Baldinger | So |
| OT | 78 | Billy Ard | Jr |
| C | 59 | Steve Truitt | Jr |
| TE | 82 | Wayne Baumgardner | So |
| TE | 83 | David Cox | So |

Defense

| Pos. | # | Name | Class |
|---|---|---|---|
| LB | 38 | Carlos Bradley | Jr |
| G | 70 | Syd Kitson | Sr |

Special teams

| Pos. | # | Name | Class |

Head coach

- John Mackovic

Coordinators/assistant coaches

Legend

- (C) Team captain
- (S) Suspended
- (I) Ineligible
- Injured
- Redshirt

== Team leaders ==
| Category | Team Leader | Att/Cth | Yds |
|---|---|---|---|
| Passing | Jay Venuto | 198/363 | 2,432 |
| Rushing | James McDougald | 260 | 1,177 |
| Receiving | Wayne Baumgardner | 55 | 1,000 |
