= 1979 Duke Blue Devils football team =

American college football season

1979 Duke Blue Devils football
- Conference: Atlantic Coast Conference
- Record: 2–8–1 (0–6 ACC)
- Head coach: Shirley Wilson (1st season)
- Offensive coordinator: Dick Kemp (2nd season)
- Defensive coordinator: Larry Thompson (1st season)
- MVP: Craig Hoskins
- Captains: Craig Hoskins; Bob Riordan
- Home stadium: Wallace Wade Stadium

1979 Atlantic Coast Conference football standings
	Conf.					Overall
Team	W		L		T	W		L		T
NC State $	5	–	1	–	0	7	–	4	–	0
Clemson	4	–	2	–	0	8	–	4	–	0
Maryland	4	–	2	–	0	7	–	4	–	0
Wake Forest	3	–	2	–	0	8	–	4	–	0
No. 15 North Carolina	3	–	3	–	0	8	–	3	–	1
Virginia	1	–	4	–	0	6	–	5	–	0
Duke	0	–	6	–	0	2	–	8	–	1
$ – Conference champion; Rankings from AP Poll

The 1979 Duke Blue Devils football team was an American football team that represented Duke University as a member of the Atlantic Coast Conference (ACC) during the 1979 NCAA Division I-A football season. In their first year under head coach Shirley Wilson, the Blue Devils compiled an overall record of 2–8–1, with a conference record of 0–6, and finished seventh in the ACC.

== Schedule ==
Date	Time	Opponent	Site	Result	Attendance	Source
September 15		East Carolina*	Wallace Wade Stadium; Durham, NC	W 28–14	33,800	
September 22		at South Carolina*	Williams–Brice Stadium; Columbia, SC	L 0–35	53,793	
September 29		at Virginia	Scott Stadium; Charlottesville, VA	L 12–30	26,947	
October 6		at Army*	Michie Stadium; West Point, NY	T 17–17	33,874	
October 13		at Richmond*	City Stadium; Richmond, VA (Tobacco Bowl)	W 34–7	10,500	
October 20		Clemson^{†}	Wallace Wade Stadium; Durham, NC	L 10–28	24,600	
October 27		Maryland	Wallace Wade Stadium; Durham, NC	L 0–27	34,200	
November 3		at Georgia Tech*	Grant Field; Atlanta, GA	L 14–24	23,445	
November 10		at No. 20 Wake Forest	Groves Stadium; Winston-Salem, NC (rivalry)	L 14–17	28,300	
November 17		NC State	Wallace Wade Stadium; Durham, NC (rivalry)	L 7–28	24,100	
November 24	1:30 p.m.	North Carolina	Wallace Wade Stadium; Durham, NC (Victory Bell)	L 16–37	39,800	
*Non-conference game; ^{†}Homecoming; Rankings from AP Poll released prior to the game; All times are in Eastern time

== Roster ==
1979 Duke Blue Devils football team roster
Players
Coaches
Offense

Pos.	#	Name	Class
G	55	Brian Baldinger	So
G	62	Greg Bamberger	So
RB	21	Greg Boone	Fr
WR	86	Chris Castor	So
QB	11	Brent Clinkscale	Fr
WR	16	Ron Frederick	So
TE	87	Joel Patten	Sr

Defense

Pos.	#	Name	Class
LB	43	Jimmy Tyson	So
LB	41	Dan Welsh	So
DL	49	Dan Yellott	So

Special teams

Pos.	#	Name	Class

Head coach

- Shirley Wilson

Coordinators/assistant coaches

Legend

- (C) Team captain
- (S) Suspended
- (I) Ineligible
- Injured
- Redshirt
