= 1979 NC State Wolfpack football team =

American college football season

1979 NC State Wolfpack football

ACC champion
- Conference: Atlantic Coast Conference
- Record: 7–4 (5–1 ACC)
- Head coach: Bo Rein (4th season)
- Home stadium: Carter–Finley Stadium

1979 Atlantic Coast Conference football standings
	Conf.					Overall
Team	W		L		T	W		L		T
NC State $	5	–	1	–	0	7	–	4	–	0
Clemson	4	–	2	–	0	8	–	4	–	0
Maryland	4	–	2	–	0	7	–	4	–	0
Wake Forest	3	–	2	–	0	8	–	4	–	0
No. 15 North Carolina	3	–	3	–	0	8	–	3	–	1
Virginia	1	–	4	–	0	6	–	5	–	0
Duke	0	–	6	–	0	2	–	8	–	1
$ – Conference champion; Rankings from AP Poll

The 1979 NC State Wolfpack football team represented the North Carolina State Wolfpack during the 1979 NCAA Division I-A football season. The team's head coach was Bo Rein. NC State has been a member of the Atlantic Coast Conference (ACC) since the league's inception in 1953. The Wolfpack played its home games in 1979 at Carter–Finley Stadium in Raleigh, North Carolina, which has been NC State football's home stadium since 1966. NC State won the 1979 ACC Championship with a record of 5–1 in conference play. At season's end the Wolfpack did not play in a bowl game, having declined an invitation to play in the Garden State Bowl. Unlike the Big Eight, Big Ten, Pacific-10, Southeastern and Southwest Conferences, the ACC did not have a contract to send its champion to a specific bowl, and would not until an agreement with the Citrus Bowl from 1987-91.

As of 2025, the 1979 NC State team is the last bowl-eligible champion from one of the Power conferences not to play in a bowl game.

Rein accepted the head coaching position at LSU on November 30, 1979. He never coached a game in Baton Rouge, perishing January 10, 1980 when the private aircraft he was traveling in flew well off course and crashed into the Atlantic Ocean off the coast of Virginia.

== Schedule ==
Date	Opponent	Rank	Site	TV	Result	Attendance	Source
September 8	East Carolina*		Carter–Finley Stadium; Raleigh, NC (rivalry)		W 34–20	53,400	
September 15	Virginia	No. 19	Carter–Finley Stadium; Raleigh, NC		W 31–27	45,800	
September 22	at West Virginia*	No. 19	Mountaineer Field; Morgantown, WV		W 38–14	26,298	
September 29	Wake Forest	No. 16	Carter–Finley Stadium; Raleigh, NC (rivalry)		W 17–14	44,800	
October 6	at Auburn*	No. 14	Jordan-Hare Stadium; Auburn, AL		L 31–44	51,146	
October 13	Maryland	No. 17	Carter–Finley Stadium; Raleigh, NC		W 7–0	39,800	
October 20	No. 19 North Carolina	No. 15	Carter–Finley Stadium; Raleigh, NC (rivalry)	ABC	L 21–35	54,200	
October 27	at Clemson		Memorial Stadium; Clemson, SC (rivalry)		W 16–13	61,412	
November 3	at South Carolina*		Williams–Brice Stadium; Columbia, SC		L 28–30	56,409	
November 10	Penn State*		Carter–Finley Stadium; Raleigh, NC		L 7–9	51,200	
November 17	at Duke		Wallace Wade Stadium; Durham, NC (rivalry)		W 28–7	24,100	
*Non-conference game; Rankings from AP Poll released prior to the game

== Roster ==
1979 NC State Wolfpack football team roster
Players
Coaches
Offense

Pos.	#	Name	Class
RB	44	Rickey Adams	Sr
RB	48	Chris Brown	Fr
RB	36	Chuckie Canady	So
OT	62	Chris Carr	So
TE	80	Lin Dawson	So
OT	76	Chris Dieterich	Sr
WR	4	Eddie Jackson	Fr
G	66	Sam Jackson	Fr
QB	12	Darnell Johnson	Fr
G	65	Joe Jones	So
WR	25	Lee Jukes	Jr
RB	39	Andre Marks	Fr
RB	21	Wayne McClean	So
WR	22	Mike Quick	So
WR	6	Curtis Rein	So
C	51	Jim Ritcher	Sr
QB	11	Scott Smith	Sr
G	72	Chuck Stone	Sr
RB	46	Dwight Sullivan	Jr
RB	28	Billy Ray Vickers	Sr

Defense

Pos.	#	Name	Class
LB	53	Robert Abraham	So
DB	14	Jeff Culler	Jr
LB	32	Marion Gale	Sr
DT	91	Bubba Green	Jr
DT	90	Simon Gupton	Sr
LB	59	Joe Hannah	Sr
LB	96	David Horning	Jr
DB	26	Ronnie Lee	Jr
DB	42	Donnie LeGrande	Jr
LB	43	Dann Lute	So
DB	16	Mike Nell	Sr
DT	95	Brian O'Doherty	Sr
DT	93	Dennis Owens	So
DL	73	John Stanton	Sr

Special teams

Pos.	#	Name	Class
P	17	John Isley	Sr

Head coach

- Bo Rein

Coordinators/assistant coaches

Legend

- (C) Team captain
- (S) Suspended
- (I) Ineligible
- Injured
- Redshirt
