= 1979 North Carolina Tar Heels football team =

American college football season

1979 North Carolina Tar Heels football

Gator Bowl champion

Gator Bowl, W 17–15 vs. Michigan
- Conference: Atlantic Coast Conference

Ranking
- Coaches: No. 14
- AP: No. 15
- Record: 8–3–1 (3–3 ACC)
- Head coach: Dick Crum (2nd season)
- Captain: Buddy Curry
- Home stadium: Kenan Memorial Stadium

1979 Atlantic Coast Conference football standings
	Conf.					Overall
Team	W		L		T	W		L		T
NC State $	5	–	1	–	0	7	–	4	–	0
Clemson	4	–	2	–	0	8	–	4	–	0
Maryland	4	–	2	–	0	7	–	4	–	0
Wake Forest	3	–	2	–	0	8	–	4	–	0
No. 15 North Carolina	3	–	3	–	0	8	–	3	–	1
Virginia	1	–	4	–	0	6	–	5	–	0
Duke	0	–	6	–	0	2	–	8	–	1
$ – Conference champion; Rankings from AP Poll

The 1979 North Carolina Tar Heels football team was an American football team that represented the University of North Carolina at Chapel Hill as a member of the Atlantic Coast Conference (ACC) during the 1979 NCAA Division I-A football season. In their second year under head coach Dick Crum, the Tar Heels compiled an overall record of 8–3–1, with a conference record of 3–3, and finished fifth in the ACC.

== Schedule ==
Date	Time	Opponent	Rank	Site	TV	Result	Attendance	Source
September 8	1:00 p.m.	South Carolina*		Kenan Memorial Stadium; Chapel Hill, NC (rivalry)		W 28–0	49,500	
September 22	1:00 p.m.	No. 13 Pittsburgh*		Kenan Memorial Stadium; Chapel Hill, NC		W 17–7	50,550	
September 29	2:00 p.m.	at Army*		Michie Stadium; West Point, NY		W 41–3	32,157	
October 6	1:00 p.m.	Cincinnati*	No. 18	Kenan Memorial Stadium; Chapel Hill, NC		W 35–14	49,000	
October 13	1:00 p.m.	Wake Forest	No. 14	Kenan Memorial Stadium; Chapel Hill, NC (rivalry)	ABC	L 19–24	50,720	
October 20	4:00 p.m.	at No. 15 NC State	No. 19	Carter–Finley Stadium; Raleigh, NC (rivalry)	ABC	W 35–21	54,200	
October 27	1:00 p.m.	East Carolina*	No. 15	Kenan Memorial Stadium; Chapel Hill, NC		T 24–24	49,700	
November 3	1:30 p.m.	at Maryland	No. 18	Byrd Stadium; College Park, MD		L 14–17	35,618	
November 10	1:00 p.m.	No. 18 Clemson		Kenan Memorial Stadium; Chapel Hill, NC		L 10–19	50,100	
November 17	1:30 p.m.	at Virginia		Scott Stadium; Charlottesville, VA (rivalry)		W 13–7	31,472	
November 24	1:30 p.m.	at Duke		Wallace Wade Stadium; Durham, NC (rivalry)		W 37–16	39,800	
December 28	9:00 p.m.	vs. No. 14 Michigan*		Gator Bowl Stadium; Jacksonville, FL (Gator Bowl)	ABC	W 17–15	70,407	
*Non-conference game; Rankings from AP Poll released prior to the game; All times are in Eastern time

== Roster ==
1979 North Carolina Tar Heels football team roster
Players
Coaches
Offense

Pos.	#	Name	Class
C	51	Rick Donnalley	Jr
QB	12	Matt Kupec	Sr
RB	20	Amos Lawrence	Jr
RB	25	Doug Paschal	Sr

Defense

Pos.	#	Name	Class
LB	57	Buddy Curry	Sr
LB	98	Lawrence Taylor	Jr
DT	76	Donnell Thompson	Jr

Special teams

Pos.	#	Name	Class

Head coach

- Dick Crum

Coordinators/assistant coaches

Legend

- (C) Team captain
- (S) Suspended
- (I) Ineligible
- Injured
- Redshirt

== 1979 team players in the NFL ==
The following players were drafted into professional football following the season.

Player	Position	Round	Pick	Franchise
Buddy Curry	Linebacker	2	36	Atlanta Falcons
Doug Paschal	Running back	5	121	Minnesota Vikings
Phil Farris	Wide receiver	11	297	Denver Broncos
