= 1979 Cincinnati Bearcats football team =

American college football season

1979 Cincinnati Bearcats football
- Conference: Independent
- Record: 2–9
- Head coach: Ralph Staub (3rd season)
- Defensive coordinator: Mark Duffner (3rd season)
- Home stadium: Nippert Stadium

1979 NCAA Division I-A independents football records
	Conf.					Overall
Team	W		L		T	W		L		T
No. 6 Florida State		–		–		11	–	1	–	0
No. 7 Pittsburgh		–		–		11	–	1	–	0
UNLV		–		–		9	–	1	–	2
No. 17 Temple		–		–		10	–	2	–	0
Tulane		–		–		9	–	3	–	0
Rutgers		–		–		8	–	3	–	0
Tennessee State		–		–		8	–	3	–	0
East Carolina		–		–		7	–	3	–	1
No. 20 Penn State		–		–		8	–	4	–	0
South Carolina		–		–		8	–	4	–	0
Navy		–		–		7	–	4	–	0
Notre Dame		–		–		7	–	4	–	0
Southern Miss		–		–		6	–	4	–	1
Syracuse		–		–		7	–	5	–	0
Colgate		–		–		5	–	4	–	1
Boston College		–		–		5	–	6	–	0
Holy Cross		–		–		5	–	6	–	0
Memphis State		–		–		5	–	6	–	0
Miami (FL)		–		–		5	–	6	–	0
North Texas State		–		–		5	–	6	–	0
Villanova		–		–		5	–	6	–	0
Virginia Tech		–		–		5	–	6	–	0
West Virginia		–		–		5	–	6	–	0
Georgia Tech		–		–		4	–	6	–	1
Louisville		–		–		4	–	6	–	1
William & Mary		–		–		4	–	7	–	0
Illinois State		–		–		3	–	8	–	0
Northeast Louisiana		–		–		3	–	8	–	0
Army		–		–		2	–	8	–	1
Air Force		–		–		2	–	9	–	0
Cincinnati		–		–		2	–	9	–	0
Richmond		–		–		0	–	11	–	0
Rankings from AP Poll

The 1979 Cincinnati Bearcats football team represented University of Cincinnati during 1979 NCAA Division I-A football season. The Bearcats, led by head coach Ralph Staub, participated as independent and played their home games at Nippert Stadium.

== Schedule ==
Date	Opponent	Site	Result	Attendance	Source
September 15	at Southern Miss	M. M. Roberts Stadium; Hattiesburg, MS	L 6–24	23,750	
September 22	at Louisville	Fairgrounds Stadium; Louisville, KY (rivalry)	L 6–24	20,174	
September 29	Villanova	Nippert Stadium; Cincinnati, OH	W 27–13	14,785	
October 6	at No. 18 North Carolina	Kenan Memorial Stadium; Chapel Hill, NC	L 14–35	49,000	
October 13	at Pittsburgh	Pitt Stadium; Pittsburgh, PA (River City Rivalry)	L 0–35	31,620	
October 20	at Temple	Veterans Stadium; Philadelphia, PA	L 14–35	13,368	
October 27	Richmond^{†}	Nippert Stadium; Cincinnati, OH	W 17–14	12,220	
November 3	No. 6 Florida State	Nippert Stadium; Cincinnati, OH	L 21–26	14,539	
November 10	Ohio	Nippert Stadium; Cincinnati, OH	L 7–27	9,916	
November 17	at Miami (OH)	Miami Field; Oxford, OH (Victory Bell)	L 14–27	12,060	
November 24	at Memphis State	Liberty Bowl Memorial Stadium; Memphis, TN (rivalry)	L 17–23	14,607	
^{†}Homecoming; Rankings from AP Poll released prior to the game

== Roster ==
1979 Cincinnati Bearcats football team roster
Players
Coaches
Offense

Pos.	#	Name	Class
FB	19	Mickey Archer	Sr
QB	6	Danny Barrett	Fr
C	50	Chris Bell	So
RB	46	James Bettis	Jr
G	61	Joe Caleca	Jr
OT	76	Joe Eilerman	Sr
QB	10	Ken Evans	Jr
TE	80	Steve Gantert	Sr
TE	89	Larry Gill	Jr
TE	97	Bo Green	So
WB	47	Aaron Hagans	Sr
C	52	David Handwerker	Jr
RB	34	Allen Harvin	So
C	51	Scott Heineman	Jr
RB	26	Howard Hill	So
QB	7	Keith Horne	So
FB	30	Ellis Johnson	So
QB	11	Tony Kapetanis	Jr
G	66	Ed Kloboves	Sr
C	53	Dan Lorenz	So
G	65	Doug Marshall	So
WR	41	Bob Massong	Jr
WR	81	Eric Molden	Jr
WB	24	Tony Omogrosso	So
FB	36	Brian Palmer	Jr
OT	75	Mike Rodgers	Sr
FB	35	Mike Schneider	Jr
G	70	Al Slusarz	Sr
G	93	Lou Smith	Jr
G	56	Vince Sylvester	So
OT	69	Kari Yli-Renko	So

Defense

Pos.	#	Name	Class
DE	72	Curtis Alexander	Jr
DB	25	Dan Androit	Jr
DT	84	Bruce Baarendse	So
DE	99	Brad Ballard	So
DE	88	Farley Bell	Sr
DB	3	Daryl Bible	Fr
LB	35	Mike Brookins	So
DT	67	Mike Bullock	Jr
DT	71	Joe Carozzoni	So
DB	22	Mike Clark	Sr
MG	49	Glen Fahis	Sr
DT	78	Randy Fournier	Jr
DB	18	Stanley Johnson	Jr
MG	59	George Jones	So
DB	14	Dan Kellett	So
DE	96	Mike Lewis	So
DT	98	Jim Miranda	Jr
LB	58	Willie Moore	So
DB	12	Terry O'Leary	Jr
DT	68	Bob Prats	So
DB	23	Steve Ries	So
DB	44	Tim Schira	So
DB	43	Jim Schmidt	So
DE	91	Simeon Simmons	Jr
DT	90	Earl Souter	Jr
DE	83	Dan Vete	Sr
DB	20	Dwight Williams	Jr
LB	45	Karl Woods	Jr
DB	28	Henry Wright	Jr

Special teams

Pos.	#	Name	Class
P	5	Mike Blevins	Jr
P	4	Mark Householder	Jr
K	13	Rich Karlis	Jr
P	2	Phil Peckich	So
K	1	Steve Schutz	Sr

Head coach

- Ralph Staub

Coordinators/assistant coaches

- Mark Duffner

Legend

- (C) Team captain
- (S) Suspended
- (I) Ineligible
- Injured
- Redshirt
