= 1979 Boston College Eagles football team =

American college football season

1979 Boston College Eagles football
- Conference: Independent
- Record: 5–6
- Head coach: Ed Chlebek (2nd season)
- Captains: Jeff Dziama; Jack Kent; John Schmeding
- Home stadium: Alumni Stadium

1979 NCAA Division I-A independents football records
	Conf.					Overall
Team	W		L		T	W		L		T
No. 6 Florida State		–		–		11	–	1	–	0
No. 7 Pittsburgh		–		–		11	–	1	–	0
UNLV		–		–		9	–	1	–	2
No. 17 Temple		–		–		10	–	2	–	0
Tulane		–		–		9	–	3	–	0
Rutgers		–		–		8	–	3	–	0
Tennessee State		–		–		8	–	3	–	0
East Carolina		–		–		7	–	3	–	1
No. 20 Penn State		–		–		8	–	4	–	0
South Carolina		–		–		8	–	4	–	0
Navy		–		–		7	–	4	–	0
Notre Dame		–		–		7	–	4	–	0
Southern Miss		–		–		6	–	4	–	1
Syracuse		–		–		7	–	5	–	0
Colgate		–		–		5	–	4	–	1
Boston College		–		–		5	–	6	–	0
Holy Cross		–		–		5	–	6	–	0
Memphis State		–		–		5	–	6	–	0
Miami (FL)		–		–		5	–	6	–	0
North Texas State		–		–		5	–	6	–	0
Villanova		–		–		5	–	6	–	0
Virginia Tech		–		–		5	–	6	–	0
West Virginia		–		–		5	–	6	–	0
Georgia Tech		–		–		4	–	6	–	1
Louisville		–		–		4	–	6	–	1
William & Mary		–		–		4	–	7	–	0
Illinois State		–		–		3	–	8	–	0
Northeast Louisiana		–		–		3	–	8	–	0
Army		–		–		2	–	8	–	1
Air Force		–		–		2	–	9	–	0
Cincinnati		–		–		2	–	9	–	0
Richmond		–		–		0	–	11	–	0
Rankings from AP Poll

The 1979 Boston College Eagles football team represented Boston College as an independent during the 1979 NCAA Division I-A football season. In its second season under head coach Ed Chlebek, the team compiled a 5–6 record, scored 215 points, and allowed 215 points. On September 22, the team's 34-7 victory over Villanova ended a 16-game losing streak dating back to the 1977 season.

The team's statistical leaders included Jay Palazola with 747 passing yards, Dan Conway with 856 rushing yards, and Rob Rikard with 603 receiving yards.

The team played its home games at Alumni Stadium in Chestnut Hill, Massachusetts.

== Schedule ==
Date	Opponent	Site	Result	Attendance	Source
September 15	Tennessee	Alumni Stadium; Chestnut Hill, MA	L 16–28	30,150	
September 22	Villanova	Alumni Stadium; Chestnut Hill, MA	W 34–7	16,083	
September 29	at Stanford	Stanford Stadium; Stanford, CA	L 14–33	36,412	
October 6	at Pittsburgh	Pitt Stadium; Pittsburgh, PA	L 7–28	52,348	
October 13	West Virginia	Alumni Field; Chestnut Hill, MA	L 18–20	21,640	
October 20	at Miami (FL)	Miami Orange Bowl; Miami, FL	L 8–19	15,013	
October 27	at Army	Michie Stadium; West Point, NY	W 29–16	40,162	
November 3	Tulane	Alumni Stadium; Chestnut Hill, MA	L 8–43	12,236	
November 17	at Syracuse	Schoellkopf Field; Ithaca, NY	W 27–10	20,245	
November 24	UMass	Alumni Stadium; Chestnut Hill, MA (rivalry)	W 41–3	28,475	
December 1	at Holy Cross	Fitton Field; Worcester, MA (rivalry)	W 13–10	20,141	

== Roster ==
1979 Boston College Eagles football team roster
Players
Coaches
Offense

Pos.	#	Name	Class
RB	37	Kevin Benjamin	Jr
OT	78	Greg Cantone	Sr
TE	87	Tom Carr	Sr
C	55	Bill Chaplick	Sr
RB	28	Ed Chomicki	Jr
FB	34	Dan Conway	Sr
SS	84	Vic Crawford	Fr
RB	3	Mike Curry	Sr
WR	29	Kevin Dempsey	Jr
RB		Shelby Gamble
TE	92	Steve Giordano	Sr
WR	21	Rich Green	Jr
QB	9	Doug Guyer	Fr
QB	7	John Loughery	So
RB	41	Nick Lubischer	Fr
RB	31	Jeff Medina	Jr
OL	79	Greg Michalec	Sr
G	75	Casey Muldoon	Jr
WR	86	Scott Nizolek	Fr
QB	14	Jay Palazola	Sr
WR	1	John Ray	So
G	65	Gerry Raymond	So
WR	12	Rob Rikard	So
WR	30	Bernie Sales	Sr
QB	8	Dennis Scala	So
G	70	John Schmeding	Sr
WR	85	Jon Schoen	Fr
TE	83	Tim Sherwin	Jr
RB	24	Leo Smith	So
OT	64	Karl Swanke	Sr
RB	40	Geoff Townsend	So

Defense

Pos.	#	Name	Class
DB	19	Doug Alston	Jr
DE	32	Steve Andrien	So
LB	47	Craig Beal	Jr
LB	38	Jim Budness	So
DB	6	Rich Dyer	Jr
LB	52	Jeff Dziama	Sr
DL	57	Joe Ferraro	So
DE	2	Clint Gaffney	Sr
LB	97	Bob Good	Fr
DE	80	Mike Gunn	Jr
DB	22	Cyril Keniry	Jr
DE	44	Jack Kent	Sr
S	20	Mike Mayock	Jr
DT	95	Joe Nash	So
DE	98	Lew Reynolds	Jr
DT	89	Mark Roopenian	Jr
DB	27	Jeff Ryan	Sr
DB	49	Jerry Stabile	Jr
DT	76	Bill Stephanos	Jr
DE	50	Greg Storr	So
LB	51	Bob Walton	Jr

Special teams

Pos.	#	Name	Class
K	10	John Cooper	So

Head coach

- Ed Chlebek

Coordinators/assistant coaches

Legend

- (C) Team captain
- (S) Suspended
- (I) Ineligible
- Injured
- Redshirt
