= 1979 North Texas State Mean Green football team =

American college football season

1979 North Texas State Mean Green football
- Conference: Independent
- Record: 5–6
- Head coach: Jerry Moore (1st season)
- Offensive coordinator: John Levra (1st season)
- Offensive scheme: I formation
- Home stadium: Fouts Field

1979 NCAA Division I-A independents football records
	Conf.					Overall
Team	W		L		T	W		L		T
No. 6 Florida State		–		–		11	–	1	–	0
No. 7 Pittsburgh		–		–		11	–	1	–	0
UNLV		–		–		9	–	1	–	2
No. 17 Temple		–		–		10	–	2	–	0
Tulane		–		–		9	–	3	–	0
Rutgers		–		–		8	–	3	–	0
Tennessee State		–		–		8	–	3	–	0
East Carolina		–		–		7	–	3	–	1
No. 20 Penn State		–		–		8	–	4	–	0
South Carolina		–		–		8	–	4	–	0
Navy		–		–		7	–	4	–	0
Notre Dame		–		–		7	–	4	–	0
Southern Miss		–		–		6	–	4	–	1
Syracuse		–		–		7	–	5	–	0
Colgate		–		–		5	–	4	–	1
Boston College		–		–		5	–	6	–	0
Holy Cross		–		–		5	–	6	–	0
Memphis State		–		–		5	–	6	–	0
Miami (FL)		–		–		5	–	6	–	0
North Texas State		–		–		5	–	6	–	0
Villanova		–		–		5	–	6	–	0
Virginia Tech		–		–		5	–	6	–	0
West Virginia		–		–		5	–	6	–	0
Georgia Tech		–		–		4	–	6	–	1
Louisville		–		–		4	–	6	–	1
William & Mary		–		–		4	–	7	–	0
Illinois State		–		–		3	–	8	–	0
Northeast Louisiana		–		–		3	–	8	–	0
Army		–		–		2	–	8	–	1
Air Force		–		–		2	–	9	–	0
Cincinnati		–		–		2	–	9	–	0
Richmond		–		–		0	–	11	–	0
Rankings from AP Poll

The 1979 North Texas State Mean Green football team was an American football team that represented North Texas State University (now known as the University of North Texas) during the 1979 NCAA Division I-A football season as an independent. In their first year under head coach Jerry Moore, the team compiled a 5–6 record.

== Schedule ==
Date	Opponent	Site	Result	Attendance	Source
September 1	UTEP	Fouts Field; Denton, TX	W 35–0	17,500	
September 8	at Oklahoma State	Lewis Field; Stillwater, OK	L 7–25	41,800	
September 15	vs. UT Arlington	Texas Stadium; Irving, TX	W 19–14	14,297	
September 22	at No. 18 SMU	Texas Stadium; Irving, TX	L 9–20	57,923	
September 29	at Kansas	Memorial Stadium; Lawrence, KS	L 18–37	39,460	
October 6	at Southern Miss	M. M. Roberts Stadium; Hattiesburg, MS	L 10–30	24,810	
October 13	New Mexico State^{†}	Fouts Field; Denton, TX	W 21–7	13,011	
October 20	West Texas State	Fouts Field; Denton, TX	W 28–14	13,700	
October 27	at Memphis State	Liberty Bowl Memorial Stadium; Memphis, TN	L 0–22		
November 3	at Louisiana Tech	State Fair Stadium; Shreveport, LA	W 19–17	3,600	
November 17	at East Carolina	Ficklen Memorial Stadium; Greenville, NC	L 16–49	23,500	
^{†}Homecoming; Rankings from AP Poll released prior to the game
