= 1979 William & Mary Tribe football team =

American college football season

1979 William & Mary Tribe football
- Conference: Independent
- Record: 4–7
- Head coach: Jim Root (8th season)
- Captains: Steve Shull; Bill Scott
- Home stadium: Cary Field

1979 NCAA Division I-A independents football records
	Conf.					Overall
Team	W		L		T	W		L		T
No. 6 Florida State		–		–		11	–	1	–	0
No. 7 Pittsburgh		–		–		11	–	1	–	0
UNLV		–		–		9	–	1	–	2
No. 17 Temple		–		–		10	–	2	–	0
Tulane		–		–		9	–	3	–	0
Rutgers		–		–		8	–	3	–	0
Tennessee State		–		–		8	–	3	–	0
East Carolina		–		–		7	–	3	–	1
No. 20 Penn State		–		–		8	–	4	–	0
South Carolina		–		–		8	–	4	–	0
Navy		–		–		7	–	4	–	0
Notre Dame		–		–		7	–	4	–	0
Southern Miss		–		–		6	–	4	–	1
Syracuse		–		–		7	–	5	–	0
Colgate		–		–		5	–	4	–	1
Boston College		–		–		5	–	6	–	0
Holy Cross		–		–		5	–	6	–	0
Memphis State		–		–		5	–	6	–	0
Miami (FL)		–		–		5	–	6	–	0
North Texas State		–		–		5	–	6	–	0
Villanova		–		–		5	–	6	–	0
Virginia Tech		–		–		5	–	6	–	0
West Virginia		–		–		5	–	6	–	0
Georgia Tech		–		–		4	–	6	–	1
Louisville		–		–		4	–	6	–	1
William & Mary		–		–		4	–	7	–	0
Illinois State		–		–		3	–	8	–	0
Northeast Louisiana		–		–		3	–	8	–	0
Army		–		–		2	–	8	–	1
Air Force		–		–		2	–	9	–	0
Cincinnati		–		–		2	–	9	–	0
Richmond		–		–		0	–	11	–	0
Rankings from AP Poll

The 1979 William & Mary Tribe football team represented the College of William & Mary as an independent during the 1979 NCAA Division I-A football season. Led by Jim Root in his eighth and final year as head coach, William & Mary finished the season with a record of 4–7.

== Schedule ==
Date	Opponent	Site	Result	Attendance	Source
September 8	at VMI	Alumni Memorial Field; Lexington, VA (rivalry)	L 3–7	5,100	
September 15	Colgate	Cary Field; Williamsburg, VA	W 28–15	10,000	
September 22	at Virginia Tech	Lane Stadium; Blacksburg, VA	L 14–35	36,800	
September 29	at Georgia Tech	Grant Field; Atlanta, GA	L 7–33	28,511	
October 6	James Madison	Cary Field; Williamsburg, VA (rivalry)	W 33–0	12,000	
October 13	vs. Navy	Foreman Field; Norfolk, VA (Oyster Bowl)	L 7–24	25,000	
October 20	Rutgers	Cary Field; Williamsburg, VA	L 0–24	16,020	
October 27	at No. 2 Delaware	Delaware Stadium; Newark, DE (rivalry)	L 0–40	19,728	
November 10	at Appalachian State	Conrad Stadium; Boone, NC	W 9–0	4,820	
November 17	Richmond	Cary Field; Williamsburg, VA (rivalry)	W 24–10	10,900	
November 24	East Carolina	Cary Field; Williamsburg, VA	L 14–38	9,100	
Rankings from AP Poll released prior to the game
