= 1979 Clemson Tigers football team =

American college football season

1979 Clemson Tigers football

Peach Bowl, L 18–24 vs. Baylor
- Conference: Atlantic Coast Conference
- Record: 8–4 (4–2 ACC)
- Head coach: Danny Ford (1st full, 2nd overall season)
- Offensive coordinator: Jimmye Laycock (3rd season)
- Defensive coordinator: Mickey Andrews (3rd season)
- Captains: Bubba Brown; Billy Lott
- Home stadium: Memorial Stadium

1979 Atlantic Coast Conference football standings
	Conf.					Overall
Team	W		L		T	W		L		T
NC State $	5	–	1	–	0	7	–	4	–	0
Clemson	4	–	2	–	0	8	–	4	–	0
Maryland	4	–	2	–	0	7	–	4	–	0
Wake Forest	3	–	2	–	0	8	–	4	–	0
No. 15 North Carolina	3	–	3	–	0	8	–	3	–	1
Virginia	1	–	4	–	0	6	–	5	–	0
Duke	0	–	6	–	0	2	–	8	–	1
$ – Conference champion; Rankings from AP Poll

The 1979 Clemson Tigers football team was an American football team that represented Clemson University in the Atlantic Coast Conference (ACC) during the 1979 NCAA Division I-A football season. In its second season under head coach Danny Ford, the team compiled an 8–4 record (4–2 against conference opponents), tied for second place in the ACC, lost to Baylor in the 1979 Peach Bowl, and outscored opponents by a total of 205 to 116. The team won the 300th game in Clemson history on September 22 and played its home games at Memorial Stadium in Clemson, South Carolina.

Bubba Brown and Billy Lott were the team captains. The team's statistical leaders included Billy Lott with 1,184 passing yards, Marvin Simms with 743 rushing yards, Perry Tuttle with 544 receiving yards, and placekicker Obed Ariri with 62 points scored (16 field goals, 14 extra points).

== Schedule ==
Date	Time	Opponent	Rank	Site	Result	Attendance	Source
September 8	1:00 p.m.	Furman*		Memorial Stadium; Clemson, SC	W 21–0	55,908	
September 15	3:20 p.m.	Maryland		Memorial Stadium; Clemson, SC	L 0–19	52,474	
September 22	1:00 p.m.	Georgia*		Memorial Stadium; Clemson, SC (rivalry)	W 12–7	62,573	
October 6	1:00 p.m.	Virginia^{†}		Memorial Stadium; Clemson, SC	W 17–7	62,310	
October 13	1:30 p.m.	at Virginia Tech*		Lane Stadium; Blacksburg, VA	W 21–0	37,700	
October 20	1:30 p.m.	at Duke		Wallace Wade Stadium; Durham, NC	W 28–10	24,600	
October 27	1:00 p.m.	NC State		Memorial Stadium; Clemson, SC (rivalry)	L 13–16	61,412	
November 3	1:00 p.m.	No. 14 Wake Forest		Memorial Stadium; Clemson, SC	W 31–0	59,205	
November 10	1:00 p.m.	at North Carolina	No. 18	Kenan Memorial Stadium; Chapel Hill, NC	W 19–10	50,100	
November 17	1:30 p.m.	at Notre Dame*	No. 14	Notre Dame Stadium; Notre Dame, IN	W 16–10	59,075	
November 24	1:30 p.m.	at No. 19 South Carolina*	No. 13	Williams–Brice Stadium; Columbia, SC (rivalry)	L 9–13	56,887	
December 31		vs. No. 19 Baylor*	No. 18	Atlanta–Fulton County Stadium; Atlanta, GA (Peach Bowl)	L 18–24	57,321	
*Non-conference game; ^{†}Homecoming; Rankings from AP Poll released prior to the game; All times are in Eastern time; Source:

== Game summaries ==
=== Duke ===
Team	1	2	3	4	Total
• Clemson	7	14	7	0	28
Duke	3	0	0	7	10

- Date: October 20
- Location: Wallace Wade Stadium • Durham, North Carolina
- Game attendance: 24,600

Scoring summary
1		DUKE	Scott McKinney 34 yard field goal	Duke 3-0
1		CLEM	McSwain 14 yard run (Pauling kick)	Clemson 7-3
2		CLEM	McSwain 12 yard run (Pauling kick)	Clemson 14-3
2	:22	CLEM	Perry 1 yard run (Pauling kick)	Clemson 21-3
3		CLEM	Perry 1 yard run (Pauling kick)	Clemson 28-3
4		DUKE	Greg Rhett (Scott McKinney kick)	Clemson 28-10

== Roster ==
1979 Clemson Tigers football team roster
Players
Coaches
Offense

Pos.	#	Name	Class
QB	3	Homer Jordan	Fr
WR	22	Perry Tuttle	So
RB	39	Marvin Sims	Sr
OL	55	Jeff Bostic	Sr

Defense

Pos.	#	Name	Class
DL	66	Steve Durham	Jr
DT	83	Jim Stuckey	Sr
DT	99	Jeff Bryant	So

Special teams

Pos.	#	Name	Class
K	1	Obed Ariri	Jr

Head coach

- Danny Ford

Coordinators/assistant coaches

Legend

- (C) Team captain
- (S) Suspended
- (I) Ineligible
- Injured
- Redshirt

Roster
