= Steve Potter (American football) =

American football player (born 1957)

No. 54, 58
- Position: Linebacker / special teamer

Personal information
- Born: November 6, 1957 (age 69); Bradford, Pennsylvania, U.S.
- Listed height: 6 ft 3 in (1.91 m)
- Listed weight: 235 lb (107 kg)

Career information
- High school: Fairview (Fairview Township, Pennsylvania)
- College: Virginia (1976–1979)
- NFL draft: 1980: undrafted

Career history
- Oakland Raiders (1980)*; Miami Dolphins (1981–1982); Kansas City Chiefs (1983); Buffalo Bills (1984); Miami Dolphins (1985)*
- * Offseason or practice squad member only

Awards and highlights
- First-team All-ACC (1979)

Career NFL statistics
- Games played: 51
- Interceptions: 1
- Stats at Pro Football Reference

Stephen John Potter (born November 6, 1957) is an American former professional football player. A linebacker and special teamer, he played four seasons in the National Football League (NFL).

After growing up in Pennsylvania, he played college football for the Virginia Cavaliers as a linebacker and defensive end from 1976 to 1979, starting in all four years. Potter was selected first-team All-Atlantic Coast Conference (ACC) as a senior in 1979. After college, he signed with the Oakland Raiders of the NFL as an undrafted free agent, but did not make the team. He made the Miami Dolphins roster in 1981 and played two seasons there, appearing in Super Bowl XVII against the Washington Redskins. Potter then played one year each with the Kansas City Chiefs and Buffalo Bills before retiring after a brief return to the Dolphins in 1985.

== Early life ==
Stephen John Potter was born on November 6, 1957, in Bradford, Pennsylvania. He moved to Erie at a young age. He attended Fairview High School in Erie County where he competed in football, basketball and track and field. At Fairview, Potter was a defensive end and fullback in football. He was selected all-county in football and basketball and helped the football team compile a record of 26–1 in a three-year span. His head coach later said that, "In my 30+ years of coaching, Potter is one of the best I've ever had. Potter combined academics, athletics, and outstanding character to excel." At Fairview, he was selected a Prep All-American. Potter was recruited to play college football for the Pittsburgh Panthers, then one of the top-ranked teams nationally, but instead chose to play for the Virginia Cavaliers, who were coached by Dick Bestwick, the cousin of Potter's high school coach.

== College career ==
Entering his freshman year at Virginia, Potter stood at 6 feet 3 inches (1.91 m) and weighed 217 pounds (98 kg), while posting a 40-yard dash time of 4.65 seconds. He became the team's starting left linebacker two games into the 1976 season. The 1976 Cavaliers compiled a record of 2–9. He suffered from a shoulder injury that worsened after he pinched a nerve in the last game of the 1976 season; The Daily Progress noted that afterwards, "When lifting weights his shoulder would pop out in any of three directions".

After initially being demoted to second-string prior to the 1977 season, Potter said he became more aggressive and then earned back a starting role at defensive end. He gave what was described as the team's "best defensive end play all season" in a game against West Virginia, posting 11 tackles. He did not play in the final three games of the season after suffering an injury that damaged ligaments in his left knee, which was the second ligament injury in his career; in high school, he had torn ligaments in his right knee. The 1977 Cavaliers compiled a record of 1–9–1. Prior to the 1978 season, Potter had surgery to fix his shoulder issue.

Potter was one of Virginia's top defensive players as a junior in 1978 despite playing through injuries. However, Virginia compiled a record of 2–9, the third-straight season to finish with nine losses. During the season, Potter posted 76 tackles, 12 tackles-for-loss, two forced fumbles and a fumble recovery. He was selected co-team captain to open his senior season in 1979. He led one of the top scoring defenses in the Atlantic Coast Conference (ACC) and helped Virginia to a record of 6–5, their first winning record since 1968. Potter was named the ACC defensive lineman of the week after posting six tackles and a forced fumble against Duke and finished the season with first-team All-ACC honors. Norris Brown, a tight end for Georgia, described Potter as the best defensive end he had competed against all season. He concluded his collegiate career having appeared in 41 games, 39 of which he started, while he missed three due to injury. He was invited to the Blue–Gray Football Classic. At Virginia, Potter was also an Academic All-ACC selection.

In 1979, The Roanoke Times described Potter's attitude as "Still Crazy After All These Years", referencing a Paul Simon album. The paper called him the most outspoken person on the team and noted that, "Even-tempered and rational off the field, Virginia's Potter loses all sanity when he steps between the lines. Or at least that's what he'd have people believe." Potter described football as a "game of intimidation", stating that "there are plenty of ways to intimidate people ... I like opponents to think I'm crazy. I go nuts out there." "If it means grabbing a face mask when the officials aren't looking, Potter will do it. If it means having another player call him 'dirty,' Potter is willing to take the abuse," reported The Times.

== Professional career ==
After going unselected in the 1980 NFL draft, Potter signed with the Oakland Raiders as an undrafted free agent, to play linebacker. He played for them in preseason but was eventually released on September 1, 1980. No other team expressed interest in him after his release, leading him to fire his agent, who was his father. He then worked as bartender at a restaurant in Charlottesville, Virginia, owned by former MLB player Charlie Sands. On May 1, 1981, he signed with the Miami Dolphins. At the time of his signing, he was one of 14 linebackers on the team and was considered a longshot to make the roster. He impressed in preseason and ultimately made the team as a backup linebacker and special teamer. He appeared in all 16 games for the Dolphins in 1981, helping them to a record of 11–4–1. In a game that year against the Philadelphia Eagles, Potter forced a fumble in the final two minutes which sealed a Dolphins victory by a score of 13–10. The Dolphins lost in the divisional round of the playoffs to the San Diego Chargers in the Epic in Miami. Potter appeared in all nine games as a backup during the strike-shortened 1982 season. Potter played with the Dolphins in Super Bowl XVII, which they lost to the Washington Redskins.

Potter was in the "thick of a numbers game" for the Dolphins in 1983. At the end of preseason, to his surprise, he was released by the Dolphins. Although the Dolphins wanted to sign him back, he was claimed off waivers by the Kansas City Chiefs. He started the second game of the season for the Chiefs, against the San Diego Chargers, and totaled 13 tackles. Although he recorded 13 tackles, he said his play in the game was not effective and he was only a backup the rest of the year. His start against the Chargers ended up being the only one of his career. Two weeks later, Potter played against his former team, the Dolphins, but the Chiefs lost 6–14. Potter appeared in all 16 games during the 1983 season, recording one interception while the Chiefs compiled a record of 6–10. Outside of the Chargers game and the game against the St. Louis Cardinals, in which he had his interception, he was almost entirely used on special teams. The Buffalo News noted that with the Chiefs, he "perfected the art of self-induced lunacy". Potter said, "When I'm lined up for a kickoff or punt, I act as crazy as I can. I'm getting the adrenaline flowing as much as I can. Getting my eyes wide as possible. Getting a crazy look on my face ... I visualize making the big hit every time, and the more I think about it, the crazier I get. But I can't single out one real crazy thing I've done in a game, because you've got to be crazy all the time."

Potter was demoted to third-string outside linebacker in training camp in 1984 and then released on August 8 that year. Two weeks into the regular season, he was signed by the Buffalo Bills after coach Kay Stephenson decided the team "could stand a large dose of mayhem on their special teams". He appeared in 10 games for the Bills but suffered from a rib injury and was later placed on the reserve/non-football illness list on December 11, due to hepatitis. The 1984 Bills compiled a record of 2–14.

Potter was released by the Bills at the start of August 1985 and then returned to the Dolphins. He was waived/injured at the end of the month and placed on injured reserve. He then ended his professional career. Across four NFL seasons, Potter appeared in 51 games, one as a starter, posting one interception. Reflecting on his career in the Boca Raton News, he noted, "I've never professed to be a great ballplayer, a blue-chipper. I'm fairly average and I have to constantly work hard to maintain my average status and playing capabilities. This is a great business to be in monetarily, but there are guys who are making the big bucks and then there are guys like myself you'll find on every team scrapping for that extra dollar. Those are the guys who really make the game, because they're constantly pushing the starters. They're what makes that starter work that much harder. If you didn't have him, you'd have some guy making on his money and just sitting back on his haunches, going through the motions."

After retiring from football, Potter worked for the Kidder-Peabody investment firm in Fort Lauderdale, Florida. He later was a financial advisor for Morgan Stanley. He was active in charity events for the NFL Alumni Association, competing in racquetball and golf tournaments. Potter was inducted into the Fairview Sports Hall of Fame in 2003 and into the Erie Sports Hall of Fame in 2004.
