= 1979 Tennessee State Tigers football team =

American college football season

1979 Tennessee State Tigers football

Black college national champion
- Conference: Independent
- Record: 8–3
- Head coach: John Merritt (17th season)
- Home stadium: Hale Stadium

1979 NCAA Division I-A independents football records
	Conf.					Overall
Team	W		L		T	W		L		T
No. 6 Florida State		–		–		11	–	1	–	0
No. 7 Pittsburgh		–		–		11	–	1	–	0
UNLV		–		–		9	–	1	–	2
No. 17 Temple		–		–		10	–	2	–	0
Tulane		–		–		9	–	3	–	0
Rutgers		–		–		8	–	3	–	0
Tennessee State		–		–		8	–	3	–	0
East Carolina		–		–		7	–	3	–	1
No. 20 Penn State		–		–		8	–	4	–	0
South Carolina		–		–		8	–	4	–	0
Navy		–		–		7	–	4	–	0
Notre Dame		–		–		7	–	4	–	0
Southern Miss		–		–		6	–	4	–	1
Syracuse		–		–		7	–	5	–	0
Colgate		–		–		5	–	4	–	1
Boston College		–		–		5	–	6	–	0
Holy Cross		–		–		5	–	6	–	0
Memphis State		–		–		5	–	6	–	0
Miami (FL)		–		–		5	–	6	–	0
North Texas State		–		–		5	–	6	–	0
Villanova		–		–		5	–	6	–	0
Virginia Tech		–		–		5	–	6	–	0
West Virginia		–		–		5	–	6	–	0
Georgia Tech		–		–		4	–	6	–	1
Louisville		–		–		4	–	6	–	1
William & Mary		–		–		4	–	7	–	0
Illinois State		–		–		3	–	8	–	0
Northeast Louisiana		–		–		3	–	8	–	0
Army		–		–		2	–	8	–	1
Air Force		–		–		2	–	9	–	0
Cincinnati		–		–		2	–	9	–	0
Richmond		–		–		0	–	11	–	0
Rankings from AP Poll

The 1979 Tennessee State Tigers football team were an American college football team which represented Tennessee State University as an independent during the 1979 NCAA Division I-A football season. Led by 17th-year head coach John Merritt, the Tigers compiled a record of 8–3.

== Schedule ==
Date	Opponent	Site	Result	Attendance	Source
September 8	at Jackson State	Mississippi Veterans Memorial Stadium; Jackson, MS	L 21–27	22,000	
September 15	Southern Illinois	Hale Stadium; Nashville, TN	L 16–18	13,388	
September 22	vs. Texas Southern	Liberty Bowl Memorial Stadium; Memphis, TN	W 21–3	19,805	
September 29	Central State (OH)	Hale Stadium; Nashville, TN	W 40–8	8,200	
October 6	No. 5 Grambling State	Hale Stadium; Nashville, TN	W 24–13	16,200	
October 20	No. 1 Florida A&M	Dudley Field; Nashville, TN	W 20–3	34,694	
October 27	at Southern	University Stadium; Baton Rouge, LA	W 17–6	20,437	
November 3	at North Carolina A&T	World War Memorial Stadium; Greensboro, NC	W 37–14	8,000	
November 9	at UNLV	Las Vegas Silver Bowl; Whitney, NV	L 28–36	26,431	
November 17	at Kentucky State	Alumni Field; Frankfort, KY	W 26–13	5,200	
November 22	Cal Poly Pomona	Hale Stadium; Nashville, TN	W 71–3	5,500	
Rankings from NCAA Division I-AA Football Committee Poll released prior to the game
