= 1979 Virginia Tech Gobblers football team =

American college football season

1979 Virginia Tech Gobblers football
- Conference: Independent
- Record: 5–6
- Head coach: Bill Dooley (2nd season)
- Home stadium: Lane Stadium

1979 NCAA Division I-A independents football records
	Conf.					Overall
Team	W		L		T	W		L		T
No. 6 Florida State		–		–		11	–	1	–	0
No. 7 Pittsburgh		–		–		11	–	1	–	0
UNLV		–		–		9	–	1	–	2
No. 17 Temple		–		–		10	–	2	–	0
Tulane		–		–		9	–	3	–	0
Rutgers		–		–		8	–	3	–	0
Tennessee State		–		–		8	–	3	–	0
East Carolina		–		–		7	–	3	–	1
No. 20 Penn State		–		–		8	–	4	–	0
South Carolina		–		–		8	–	4	–	0
Navy		–		–		7	–	4	–	0
Notre Dame		–		–		7	–	4	–	0
Southern Miss		–		–		6	–	4	–	1
Syracuse		–		–		7	–	5	–	0
Colgate		–		–		5	–	4	–	1
Boston College		–		–		5	–	6	–	0
Holy Cross		–		–		5	–	6	–	0
Memphis State		–		–		5	–	6	–	0
Miami (FL)		–		–		5	–	6	–	0
North Texas State		–		–		5	–	6	–	0
Villanova		–		–		5	–	6	–	0
Virginia Tech		–		–		5	–	6	–	0
West Virginia		–		–		5	–	6	–	0
Georgia Tech		–		–		4	–	6	–	1
Louisville		–		–		4	–	6	–	1
William & Mary		–		–		4	–	7	–	0
Illinois State		–		–		3	–	8	–	0
Northeast Louisiana		–		–		3	–	8	–	0
Army		–		–		2	–	8	–	1
Air Force		–		–		2	–	9	–	0
Cincinnati		–		–		2	–	9	–	0
Richmond		–		–		0	–	11	–	0
Rankings from AP Poll

The 1979 Virginia Tech Gobblers football team was an American football team that represented Virginia Tech as an independent during the 1979 NCAA Division I-A football season. In their second year under head coach Bill Dooley, the Gobblers compiled an overall record of 5–6.

== Schedule ==
Date	Opponent	Site	TV	Result	Attendance	Source
September 8	at Louisville	Fairgrounds Stadium; Louisville, KY		W 15–14	29,436	
September 15	Appalachian State	Lane Stadium; Blacksburg, VA		W 41–32	30,300	
September 22	William & Mary	Lane Stadium; Blacksburg, VA		W 35–14	36,800	
September 29	No. 12 Florida State	Lane Stadium; Blacksburg, VA	ABC	L 10–17	39,200	
October 6	Wake Forest	Lane Stadium; Blacksburg, VA		L 14–19	36,600	
October 13	Clemson	Lane Stadium; Blacksburg, VA		L 0–21	37,700	
October 20	Richmond^{†}	Lane Stadium; Blacksburg, VA		W 34–0	39,600	
October 27	at No. 1 Alabama	Bryant–Denny Stadium; Tuscaloosa, AL		L 7–31	60,210	
November 3	at West Virginia	Mountaineer Field; Morgantown, WV (rivalry)		L 23–34	27,531	
November 10	at Virginia	Scott Stadium; Charlottesville, VA (rivalry)		L 18–20	38,847	
November 17	VMI	Lane Stadium; Blacksburg, VA (rivalry)		W 27–20	22,300	
^{†}Homecoming; Rankings from AP Poll released prior to the game

== Roster ==
The following players were members of the 1979 football team.

1979 Virginia Tech roster
Bobby Allen; Zack Apkarian; Jeff Bailey; Dennis Behl; Tony Blackmon; Jeff Bolton; Mike Borden; Ricky Brilliant; William C. Britts; Geoff Brown; Wally Browne; Cass Camp; Steve Casey; Chris Cosh; Jeff Dahl; Paul Davis; Scott Dovel; John Drinkard; Johnnie Edmonds; George Evans; Michel Faulkner; Mickey Fitzgerald; Gillett Ford; Joe Fraley; John Gambone	Mike Giacolone; Ricky Hall; Danny Hill; Billy Hite; Steve Jacobsen; Tim Jarvis; Eric King; Mike Kovac; Don LaRue; Dennis Laury; Cyrus Lawrence; Kenny Lewis Sr.; John Ludlow; Ron Luraschi; Carl McDonald; Doug McDougald; Tony McKee; Matt Mead; Bucky Methfessel; Richard Harold Miley; Wayne Mutter; Jerome Pannell	Nate Parker; Padro Phillips; Rob Purdham; Bill Renner; Mickey Rogers; Mike Scharnus; John Scott; Dave Smigelsky; Gary Smith; Sidney Snell; Lewis Stuart; Jeremiah Thomas; Andy Tommelleo; Mark Udinski; Craig Van Schoick; Roe Waldron; Paul Watkins; Tom Webb; Steve Wirt; Lawrence Young; Ron Zollicoffer; Michael Edward Zouzalik
