= 1979 UNLV Rebels football team =

American college football season

1979 UNLV Rebels football
- Conference: Independent
- Record: 9–1–2
- Head coach: Tony Knap (4th season)
- Home stadium: Las Vegas Silver Bowl

1979 NCAA Division I-A independents football records
	Conf.					Overall
Team	W		L		T	W		L		T
No. 6 Florida State		–		–		11	–	1	–	0
No. 7 Pittsburgh		–		–		11	–	1	–	0
UNLV		–		–		9	–	1	–	2
No. 17 Temple		–		–		10	–	2	–	0
Tulane		–		–		9	–	3	–	0
Rutgers		–		–		8	–	3	–	0
Tennessee State		–		–		8	–	3	–	0
East Carolina		–		–		7	–	3	–	1
No. 20 Penn State		–		–		8	–	4	–	0
South Carolina		–		–		8	–	4	–	0
Navy		–		–		7	–	4	–	0
Notre Dame		–		–		7	–	4	–	0
Southern Miss		–		–		6	–	4	–	1
Syracuse		–		–		7	–	5	–	0
Colgate		–		–		5	–	4	–	1
Boston College		–		–		5	–	6	–	0
Holy Cross		–		–		5	–	6	–	0
Memphis State		–		–		5	–	6	–	0
Miami (FL)		–		–		5	–	6	–	0
North Texas State		–		–		5	–	6	–	0
Villanova		–		–		5	–	6	–	0
Virginia Tech		–		–		5	–	6	–	0
West Virginia		–		–		5	–	6	–	0
Georgia Tech		–		–		4	–	6	–	1
Louisville		–		–		4	–	6	–	1
William & Mary		–		–		4	–	7	–	0
Illinois State		–		–		3	–	8	–	0
Northeast Louisiana		–		–		3	–	8	–	0
Army		–		–		2	–	8	–	1
Air Force		–		–		2	–	9	–	0
Cincinnati		–		–		2	–	9	–	0
Richmond		–		–		0	–	11	–	0
Rankings from AP Poll

The 1979 UNLV Rebels football team was an American football team that represented the University of Nevada, Las Vegas as an independent during the 1979 NCAA Division I-A football season. In their fourth year under head coach Tony Knap, the team compiled a 9–1–2 record.

== Schedule ==
Date	Opponent	Site	Result	Attendance	Source
September 8	Cal State Fullerton	Las Vegas Silver Bowl; Whitney, NV	W 35–14	20,881	
September 15	at Nevada	Mackay Stadium; Reno, NV (Fremont Cannon)	W 26–21	12,751	
September 22	at UTEP	Sun Bowl; El Paso, TX	L 15–17	27,400	
September 29	at Hawaii	Aloha Stadium; Honolulu, HI	W 48–31	44,143	
October 6	Northern Colorado	Las Vegas Silver Bowl; Whitney, NV	W 35–31	20,925	
October 13	New Mexico	Las Vegas Silver Bowl; Whitney, NV	W 28–20	22,201	
October 20	Utah	Las Vegas Silver Bowl; Whitney, NV	W 43–41	24,782	
October 27	at Wyoming	War Memorial Stadium; Laramie, WY	W 28–24	13,637	
November 3	at Fresno State	Ratcliffe Stadium; Fresno, CA	W 31–28	8,143	
November 9	Tennessee State	Las Vegas Silver Bowl; Whitney, NV	W 36–28	26,431	
November 17	Colorado State	Las Vegas Silver Bowl; Whitney, NV	T 21–21	24,607	
November 23	Lamar	Las Vegas Silver Bowl; Whitney, NV	T 24–24	19,818	
