= 1979 Southern Miss Golden Eagles football team =

American college football season

1979 Southern Miss Golden Eagles football
- Conference: Independent
- Record: 6–4–1
- Head coach: Bobby Collins (5th season)
- Home stadium: M. M. Roberts Stadium

1979 NCAA Division I-A independents football records
	Conf.					Overall
Team	W		L		T	W		L		T
No. 6 Florida State		–		–		11	–	1	–	0
No. 7 Pittsburgh		–		–		11	–	1	–	0
UNLV		–		–		9	–	1	–	2
No. 17 Temple		–		–		10	–	2	–	0
Tulane		–		–		9	–	3	–	0
Rutgers		–		–		8	–	3	–	0
Tennessee State		–		–		8	–	3	–	0
East Carolina		–		–		7	–	3	–	1
No. 20 Penn State		–		–		8	–	4	–	0
South Carolina		–		–		8	–	4	–	0
Navy		–		–		7	–	4	–	0
Notre Dame		–		–		7	–	4	–	0
Southern Miss		–		–		6	–	4	–	1
Syracuse		–		–		7	–	5	–	0
Colgate		–		–		5	–	4	–	1
Boston College		–		–		5	–	6	–	0
Holy Cross		–		–		5	–	6	–	0
Memphis State		–		–		5	–	6	–	0
Miami (FL)		–		–		5	–	6	–	0
North Texas State		–		–		5	–	6	–	0
Villanova		–		–		5	–	6	–	0
Virginia Tech		–		–		5	–	6	–	0
West Virginia		–		–		5	–	6	–	0
Georgia Tech		–		–		4	–	6	–	1
Louisville		–		–		4	–	6	–	1
William & Mary		–		–		4	–	7	–	0
Illinois State		–		–		3	–	8	–	0
Northeast Louisiana		–		–		3	–	8	–	0
Army		–		–		2	–	8	–	1
Air Force		–		–		2	–	9	–	0
Cincinnati		–		–		2	–	9	–	0
Richmond		–		–		0	–	11	–	0
Rankings from AP Poll

The 1979 Southern Miss Golden Eagles football team was an American football team that represented the University of Southern Mississippi as an independent during the 1979 NCAA Division I-A football season. In their fifth year under head coach Bobby Collins, the team compiled a 6–4–1 record.

== Schedule ==
Date	Opponent	Site	Result	Attendance	Source
September 8	at No. 19 Florida State	Doak Campbell Stadium; Tallahassee, FL	L 14–17	45,467	
September 15	Cincinnati	M. M. Roberts Stadium; Hattiesburg, MS	W 24–6	23,750	
September 22	at Auburn	Jordan–Hare Stadium; Auburn, AL	L 9–31	45,226	
September 29	vs. Ole Miss	Mississippi Veterans Memorial Stadium; Jackson, MS	W 38–8	46,720	
October 6	North Texas State	M. M. Roberts Stadium; Hattiesburg, MS	W 30–10	24,810	
October 13	Tulane	M. M. Roberts Stadium; Hattiesburg, MS (rivalry)	L 19–20	30,028	
October 20	Memphis State^{†}	M. M. Roberts Stadium; Hattiesburg, MS (rivalry)	W 22–0	27,286	
October 27	at Mississippi State	Scott Field; Starkville, MS	W 21–7	35,500	
November 3	at Louisville	Cardinal Stadium; Louisville, KY	T 10–10	13,085	
November 10	at Bowling Green	Doyt Perry Stadium; Bowling Green, OH	L 27–31	10,556	
November 17	Arkansas State	M. M. Roberts Stadium; Hattiesburg, MS	W 14–6	16,340	
^{†}Homecoming; Rankings from AP Poll released prior to the game
