= 1979 Richmond Spiders football team =

American college football season

1979 Richmond Spiders football
- Conference: Independent
- Record: 0–11
- Head coach: Jim Tait (6th season)
- Offensive coordinator: Jim Marshall (1st season)
- Home stadium: City Stadium

1979 NCAA Division I-A independents football records
	Conf.					Overall
Team	W		L		T	W		L		T
No. 6 Florida State		–		–		11	–	1	–	0
No. 7 Pittsburgh		–		–		11	–	1	–	0
UNLV		–		–		9	–	1	–	2
No. 17 Temple		–		–		10	–	2	–	0
Tulane		–		–		9	–	3	–	0
Rutgers		–		–		8	–	3	–	0
Tennessee State		–		–		8	–	3	–	0
East Carolina		–		–		7	–	3	–	1
No. 20 Penn State		–		–		8	–	4	–	0
South Carolina		–		–		8	–	4	–	0
Navy		–		–		7	–	4	–	0
Notre Dame		–		–		7	–	4	–	0
Southern Miss		–		–		6	–	4	–	1
Syracuse		–		–		7	–	5	–	0
Colgate		–		–		5	–	4	–	1
Boston College		–		–		5	–	6	–	0
Holy Cross		–		–		5	–	6	–	0
Memphis State		–		–		5	–	6	–	0
Miami (FL)		–		–		5	–	6	–	0
North Texas State		–		–		5	–	6	–	0
Villanova		–		–		5	–	6	–	0
Virginia Tech		–		–		5	–	6	–	0
West Virginia		–		–		5	–	6	–	0
Georgia Tech		–		–		4	–	6	–	1
Louisville		–		–		4	–	6	–	1
William & Mary		–		–		4	–	7	–	0
Illinois State		–		–		3	–	8	–	0
Northeast Louisiana		–		–		3	–	8	–	0
Army		–		–		2	–	8	–	1
Air Force		–		–		2	–	9	–	0
Cincinnati		–		–		2	–	9	–	0
Richmond		–		–		0	–	11	–	0
Rankings from AP Poll

The 1979 Richmond Spiders football team represented the University of Richmond in the 1979 NCAA Division I-A football season. The Spiders were led by sixth year head coach Jim Tait and played their home games at City Stadium. They were classified as an Independent. The 1979 campaign marked Tait's final year as head coach after Richmond finished with a winless 0–11 record.

== Schedule ==
Date	Opponent	Site	Result	Attendance	Source
September 8	at Virginia	Scott Stadium; Charlottesville, VA	L 0–31	29,673	
September 15	at VMI	Alumni Memorial Field; Lexington, VA (rivalry)	L 7–17	6,300	
September 22	at Wyoming	War Memorial Stadium; Laramie, WY	L 7–9	21,474	
September 29	West Virginia	City Stadium; Richmond, VA	L 18–20	17,500	
October 6	Arkansas State	City Stadium; Richmond, VA	L 3–24		
October 13	Duke	City Stadium; Richmond, VA (Tobacco Bowl)	L 7–34	10,500	
October 20	at Virginia Tech	Lane Stadium; Blacksburg, VA	L 0–34	39,600	
October 27	at Cincinnati	Nippert Stadium; Cincinnati, OH	L 14–17	12,220	
November 3	Villanova	City Stadium; Richmond, VA	L 3–9	10,000	
November 10	at East Carolina	Ficklen Memorial Stadium; Greenville, NC	L 10–52	18,741	
November 17	at William & Mary	Cary Field; Williamsburg, VA (rivalry)	L 10–24	10,900	

== Roster ==
1979 Richmond Spiders football team roster
Players
Coaches
Offense

Pos.	#	Name	Class
RB	39	Reggie Evans	Jr
QB	10	Greg Gregory	Sr
RB	20	Barry Redden	So
QB	15	Pete Smith	Jr

Defense

Pos.	#	Name	Class
DT	76	Mark Seale	So

Special teams

Pos.	#	Name	Class

Head coach

- Jim Tait

Coordinators/assistant coaches

- Jim Marshall (Offensive coordinator)

Legend

- (C) Team captain
- (S) Suspended
- (I) Ineligible
- Injured
- Redshirt
