= 1979 Memphis State Tigers football team =

American college football season

1979 Memphis State Tigers football
- Conference: Independent
- Record: 5–6
- Head coach: Richard Williamson (5th season)
- Offensive coordinator: Jim Ragland (5th season)
- Captains: Wayne Weedon; Leo Cage
- Home stadium: Liberty Bowl Memorial Stadium

1979 NCAA Division I-A independents football records
	Conf.					Overall
Team	W		L		T	W		L		T
No. 6 Florida State		–		–		11	–	1	–	0
No. 7 Pittsburgh		–		–		11	–	1	–	0
UNLV		–		–		9	–	1	–	2
No. 17 Temple		–		–		10	–	2	–	0
Tulane		–		–		9	–	3	–	0
Rutgers		–		–		8	–	3	–	0
Tennessee State		–		–		8	–	3	–	0
East Carolina		–		–		7	–	3	–	1
No. 20 Penn State		–		–		8	–	4	–	0
South Carolina		–		–		8	–	4	–	0
Navy		–		–		7	–	4	–	0
Notre Dame		–		–		7	–	4	–	0
Southern Miss		–		–		6	–	4	–	1
Syracuse		–		–		7	–	5	–	0
Colgate		–		–		5	–	4	–	1
Boston College		–		–		5	–	6	–	0
Holy Cross		–		–		5	–	6	–	0
Memphis State		–		–		5	–	6	–	0
Miami (FL)		–		–		5	–	6	–	0
North Texas State		–		–		5	–	6	–	0
Villanova		–		–		5	–	6	–	0
Virginia Tech		–		–		5	–	6	–	0
West Virginia		–		–		5	–	6	–	0
Georgia Tech		–		–		4	–	6	–	1
Louisville		–		–		4	–	6	–	1
William & Mary		–		–		4	–	7	–	0
Illinois State		–		–		3	–	8	–	0
Northeast Louisiana		–		–		3	–	8	–	0
Army		–		–		2	–	8	–	1
Air Force		–		–		2	–	9	–	0
Cincinnati		–		–		2	–	9	–	0
Richmond		–		–		0	–	11	–	0
Rankings from AP Poll

The 1979 Memphis State Tigers football team represented Memphis State University (now known as the University of Memphis) as an independent during the 1979 NCAA Division I-A football season. In its fifth season under head coach Richard Williamson, the team compiled a 5–6 record and was outscored by a total of 223 to 166. The team played its home games at Liberty Bowl Memorial Stadium in Memphis, Tennessee.

The team's statistical leaders included Kevin Betts with 884 passing yards, Leo Cage with 599 rushing yards, Tony Hunt with 234 receiving yards, and Richard Locke with 30 points scored.

== Schedule ==
Date	Opponent	Site	Result	Attendance	Source
September 8	at Mississippi State	Mississippi Veterans Memorial Stadium; Jackson, MS	W 14–13	43,500	
September 15	Ole Miss	Liberty Bowl Memorial Stadium; Memphis, TN (rivalry)	L 34–38	53,166	
September 22	at Wichita State	Cessna Stadium; Wichita, KS	W 16–10	17,922	
September 29	Texas A&M	Liberty Bowl Memorial Stadium; Memphis, TN	L 7–17	38,477	
October 13	Northeast Louisiana	Liberty Bowl Memorial Stadium; Memphis, TN	L 20–21	25,494	
October 20	at Southern Miss	M. M. Roberts Stadium; Hattiesburg, MS (rivalry)	L 0–22	27,286	
October 27	North Texas State	Liberty Bowl Memorial Stadium; Memphis, TN	W 22–0		
November 3	at Vanderbilt	Dudley Field; Nashville, TN	L 3–13	28,900	
November 10	Louisville^{†}	Liberty Bowl Memorial Stadium; Memphis, TN (rivalry)	W 10–6	17,205	
November 17	at No. 5 Florida State	Doak Campbell Stadium; Tallahassee, FL	L 17–66	48,021	
November 24	Cincinnati	Liberty Bowl Memorial Stadium; Memphis, TN (rivalry)	W 23–17	14,607	
^{†}Homecoming; Rankings from AP Poll released prior to the game
