= 1979 West Virginia Mountaineers football team =

American college football season

1979 West Virginia Mountaineers football
- Conference: Independent
- Record: 5–6
- Head coach: Frank Cignetti Sr. (4th season)
- Defensive coordinator: Gary Tranquill (1st season)
- Home stadium: Mountaineer Field

1979 NCAA Division I-A independents football records
	Conf.					Overall
Team	W		L		T	W		L		T
No. 6 Florida State		–		–		11	–	1	–	0
No. 7 Pittsburgh		–		–		11	–	1	–	0
UNLV		–		–		9	–	1	–	2
No. 17 Temple		–		–		10	–	2	–	0
Tulane		–		–		9	–	3	–	0
Rutgers		–		–		8	–	3	–	0
Tennessee State		–		–		8	–	3	–	0
East Carolina		–		–		7	–	3	–	1
No. 20 Penn State		–		–		8	–	4	–	0
South Carolina		–		–		8	–	4	–	0
Navy		–		–		7	–	4	–	0
Notre Dame		–		–		7	–	4	–	0
Southern Miss		–		–		6	–	4	–	1
Syracuse		–		–		7	–	5	–	0
Colgate		–		–		5	–	4	–	1
Boston College		–		–		5	–	6	–	0
Holy Cross		–		–		5	–	6	–	0
Memphis State		–		–		5	–	6	–	0
Miami (FL)		–		–		5	–	6	–	0
North Texas State		–		–		5	–	6	–	0
Villanova		–		–		5	–	6	–	0
Virginia Tech		–		–		5	–	6	–	0
West Virginia		–		–		5	–	6	–	0
Georgia Tech		–		–		4	–	6	–	1
Louisville		–		–		4	–	6	–	1
William & Mary		–		–		4	–	7	–	0
Illinois State		–		–		3	–	8	–	0
Northeast Louisiana		–		–		3	–	8	–	0
Army		–		–		2	–	8	–	1
Air Force		–		–		2	–	9	–	0
Cincinnati		–		–		2	–	9	–	0
Richmond		–		–		0	–	11	–	0
Rankings from AP Poll

The 1979 West Virginia Mountaineers football team represented West Virginia University in the 1979 NCAA Division I-A football season. It was the Mountaineers' 87th overall season and they competed as a Division I-A Independent. The team was led by head coach Frank Cignetti Sr., in his fourth year, and played their final season of home games at Mountaineer Field in Morgantown, West Virginia. They finished the season with a record of five wins and six losses (5–6 overall).

== Schedule ==
Date	Opponent	Site	Result	Attendance	Source
September 8	Temple	Mountaineer Field; Morgantown, WV	L 16–38	34,299	
September 15	vs. Syracuse	Giants Stadium; East Rutherford, NJ (rivalry)	L 14–24	10,375	
September 22	No. 19 NC State	Mountaineer Field; Morgantown, WV	L 14–38	26,298	
September 29	at Richmond	City Stadium; Richmond, VA	W 20–18	17,500	
October 6	Kentucky^{†}	Mountaineer Field; Morgantown, WV	W 10–6	33,792	
October 13	at Boston College	Alumni Stadium; Chestnut Hill, MA	W 20–18	21,640	
October 20	Tulane	Mountaineer Field; Morgantown, WV	W 27–17	28,303	
October 27	at Penn State	Beaver Stadium; University Park, PA (rivalry)	L 6–31	77,923	
November 3	Virginia Tech	Mountaineer Field; Morgantown, WV (rivalry)	W 34–23	27,531	
November 10	No. 12 Pittsburgh	Mountaineer Field; Morgantown, WV (rivalry)	L 17–24	38,681	
November 17	at Arizona State	Sun Devil Stadium; Tempe, AZ	L 7–42	68,573	
^{†}Homecoming; Rankings from AP Poll released prior to the game

== Roster ==
1979 West Virginia Mountaineers football team roster
Players
Coaches
Offense

Pos.	#	Name	Class
QB	7	Curt Cignetti	Fr
QB	8	Roger Dietz	So
WR	9	Cedric Thomas	Jr
QB	10	Oliver Luck	So
RB	31	Robert Alexander	Jr
FB	45	Walter Easley	Jr
C	52	Jack Palmer	Jr
G	62	Jim Himic	Jr
WR	81	Darrell Miller	So
TE	83	Mike Durrette	Jr

Defense

Pos.	#	Name	Class
DB	15	Sedrick King	So
DB	17	Mike Byus	Fr
RB	18	Ed Armstrong	So
DB	19	Mark Pupilli	Jr
DB	27	Jerry Holmes	Sr
DB	40	Fulton Walker	Jr
LB	50	Dennis Fowlkes	Fr
LB	90	Darryl Talley	Fr
DT	91	Todd Campbell	Fr

Special teams

Pos.	#	Name	Class
K	1	Steve Sinclair	Jr
P	5	Curt Carion	Jr

Head coach

- Frank Cignetti Sr.

Coordinators/assistant coaches

- Nick Saban – Defensive backs

Legend

- (C) Team captain
- (S) Suspended
- (I) Ineligible
- Injured
- Redshirt
