= 1979 Georgia Tech Yellow Jackets football team =

American college football season

1979 Georgia Tech Yellow Jackets football
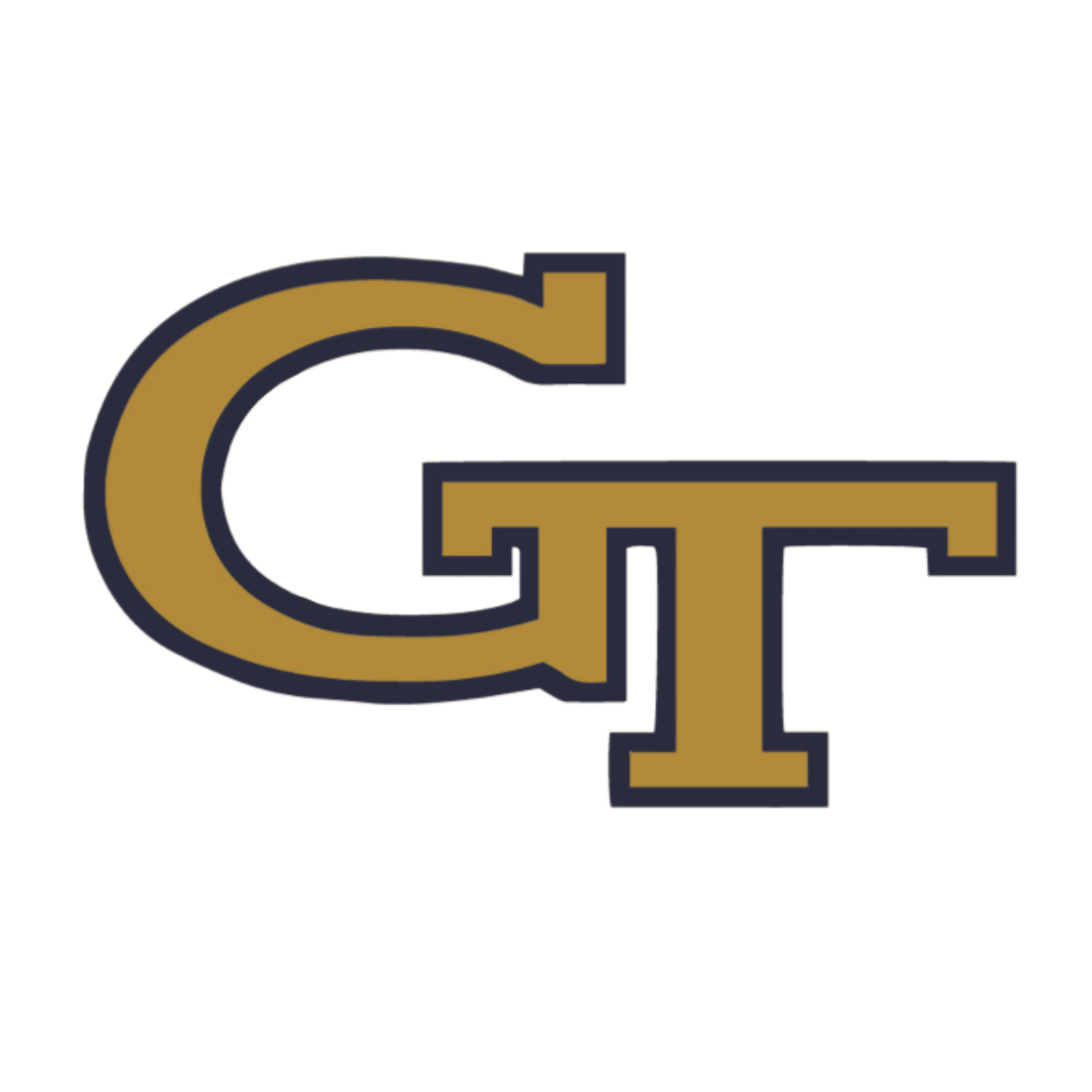
- Conference: Independent
- Record: 4–6–1
- Head coach: Pepper Rodgers (6th season)
- Offensive coordinator: Larry Travis (2nd season)
- Defensive coordinator: Jack Westbroook (2nd season)
- Captain: Tom Daniel
- Home stadium: Grant Field

1979 NCAA Division I-A independents football records
	Conf.					Overall
Team	W		L		T	W		L		T
No. 6 Florida State		–		–		11	–	1	–	0
No. 7 Pittsburgh		–		–		11	–	1	–	0
UNLV		–		–		9	–	1	–	2
No. 17 Temple		–		–		10	–	2	–	0
Tulane		–		–		9	–	3	–	0
Rutgers		–		–		8	–	3	–	0
Tennessee State		–		–		8	–	3	–	0
East Carolina		–		–		7	–	3	–	1
No. 20 Penn State		–		–		8	–	4	–	0
South Carolina		–		–		8	–	4	–	0
Navy		–		–		7	–	4	–	0
Notre Dame		–		–		7	–	4	–	0
Southern Miss		–		–		6	–	4	–	1
Syracuse		–		–		7	–	5	–	0
Colgate		–		–		5	–	4	–	1
Boston College		–		–		5	–	6	–	0
Holy Cross		–		–		5	–	6	–	0
Memphis State		–		–		5	–	6	–	0
Miami (FL)		–		–		5	–	6	–	0
North Texas State		–		–		5	–	6	–	0
Villanova		–		–		5	–	6	–	0
Virginia Tech		–		–		5	–	6	–	0
West Virginia		–		–		5	–	6	–	0
Georgia Tech		–		–		4	–	6	–	1
Louisville		–		–		4	–	6	–	1
William & Mary		–		–		4	–	7	–	0
Illinois State		–		–		3	–	8	–	0
Northeast Louisiana		–		–		3	–	8	–	0
Army		–		–		2	–	8	–	1
Air Force		–		–		2	–	9	–	0
Cincinnati		–		–		2	–	9	–	0
Richmond		–		–		0	–	11	–	0
Rankings from AP Poll

The 1979 Georgia Tech Yellow Jackets football team represented the Georgia Institute of Technology during the 1979 NCAA Division I-A football season. The Yellow Jackets were led by head coach Pepper Rodgers, in his sixth and final year with the team, and played their home games at Grant Field in Atlanta. Rodgers was fired as head coach after a 4–6–1 campaign.

== Schedule ==
Date	Opponent	Site	TV	Result	Attendance	Source
September 8	No. 2 Alabama	Grant Field; Atlanta, GA (rivalry)	ABC	L 6–30	57,621	
September 22	at Florida	Florida Field; Gainesville, FL		T 7–7	60,313	
September 29	William & Mary	Grant Field; Atlanta, GA		W 33–7	28,511	
October 6	at No. 10 Notre Dame	Notre Dame Stadium; Notre Dame, IN (rivalry)		L 13–21	59,075	
October 13	at Tennessee	Neyland Stadium; Knoxville, TN (rivalry)		L 0–31	85,524	
October 20	No. 14 Auburn	Grant Field; Atlanta, GA (rivalry)		L 14–38	54,236	
October 27	at Tulane	Louisiana Superdome; New Orleans, LA		L 7–12	51,963	
November 3	Duke	Grant Field; Atlanta, GA		W 24–14	23,445	
November 10	Air Force^{†}	Grant Field; Atlanta, GA		W 21–0	30,113	
November 17	Navy	Grant Field; Atlanta, GA		W 24–14	24,318	
November 24	Georgia	Grant Field; Atlanta, GA (Clean, Old-Fashioned Hate)	ABC	L 3–16	48,781	
^{†}Homecoming; Rankings from AP Poll released prior to the game

== Roster ==
1979 Georgia Tech Yellow Jackets football team roster
Players			Coaches
Offense: Pos. / # / Name / Class; QB / 2 / Mike Kelley / So	Defense: Pos. / # / Name / Class; LB / 81 / Al Richardson / Sr	Special teams: Pos. / # / Name / Class	Head coach: Pepper Rodgers; Coordinators/assistant coaches: Larry Travis – Offensive coordinator/offensive line; Steve Spurrier – Quarterbacks; Norm Van Brocklin – Running backs; Terry Tuley – Receivers; Les Hanly – Offensive line; Jack Westbrook – Defensive coordinator/defensive backs; Ed Emory – Defensive line; Ken Blair – Outside linebackers; Legend: (C) Team captain; (S) Suspended; (I) Ineligible; Injured; Redshirt
