= 1979 East Carolina Pirates football team =

American college football season

1979 East Carolina Pirates football
- Conference: Independent
- Record: 7–3–1
- Head coach: Pat Dye (6th season)
- Home stadium: Ficklen Memorial Stadium

1979 NCAA Division I-A independents football records
	Conf.					Overall
Team	W		L		T	W		L		T
No. 6 Florida State		–		–		11	–	1	–	0
No. 7 Pittsburgh		–		–		11	–	1	–	0
UNLV		–		–		9	–	1	–	2
No. 17 Temple		–		–		10	–	2	–	0
Tulane		–		–		9	–	3	–	0
Rutgers		–		–		8	–	3	–	0
Tennessee State		–		–		8	–	3	–	0
East Carolina		–		–		7	–	3	–	1
No. 20 Penn State		–		–		8	–	4	–	0
South Carolina		–		–		8	–	4	–	0
Navy		–		–		7	–	4	–	0
Notre Dame		–		–		7	–	4	–	0
Southern Miss		–		–		6	–	4	–	1
Syracuse		–		–		7	–	5	–	0
Colgate		–		–		5	–	4	–	1
Boston College		–		–		5	–	6	–	0
Holy Cross		–		–		5	–	6	–	0
Memphis State		–		–		5	–	6	–	0
Miami (FL)		–		–		5	–	6	–	0
North Texas State		–		–		5	–	6	–	0
Villanova		–		–		5	–	6	–	0
Virginia Tech		–		–		5	–	6	–	0
West Virginia		–		–		5	–	6	–	0
Georgia Tech		–		–		4	–	6	–	1
Louisville		–		–		4	–	6	–	1
William & Mary		–		–		4	–	7	–	0
Illinois State		–		–		3	–	8	–	0
Northeast Louisiana		–		–		3	–	8	–	0
Army		–		–		2	–	8	–	1
Air Force		–		–		2	–	9	–	0
Cincinnati		–		–		2	–	9	–	0
Richmond		–		–		0	–	11	–	0
Rankings from AP Poll

The 1979 East Carolina Pirates football team was an American football team that represented East Carolina University as an independent during the 1979 NCAA Division I-A football season. In their sixth season under head coach Pat Dye, the team compiled a 7–3–1 record.

== Schedule ==
Date	Opponent	Site	Result	Attendance	Source
September 1	Western Carolina	Ficklen Memorial Stadium; Greenville, NC	W 31–6	25,500	
September 8	at NC State	Carter–Finley Stadium; Raleigh, NC (rivalry)	L 20–34	53,400	
September 15	at Duke	Wallace Wade Stadium; Durham, NC	L 14–28	33,800	
September 22	at Wake Forest	Groves Stadium; Winston-Salem, NC	L 20–23	28,751	
September 29	VMI	Ficklen Memorial Stadium; Greenville, NC	W 45–10	20,201	
October 13	The Citadel	Ficklen Memorial Stadium; Greenville, NC	W 49–7	28,751	
October 27	at No. 15 North Carolina	Kenan Memorial Stadium; Chapel Hill, NC	T 24–24	49,700	
November 3	at Appalachian State	Conrad Stadium; Boone, NC	W 38–21	13,815	
November 10	Richmond	Ficklen Memorial Stadium; Greenville, NC	W 52–10	18,741	
November 17	North Texas State	Ficklen Memorial Stadium; Greenville, NC	W 49–16	23,500	
November 24	at William & Mary	Cary Field; Williamsburg, VA	W 38–14	9,100	
Rankings from Coaches' Poll released prior to the game
