= 1979 Navy Midshipmen football team =

American college football season

1979 Navy Midshipmen football
- Conference: Independent
- Record: 7–4
- Head coach: George Welsh (7th season)
- Captains: Larry Klawinski; Tom Paulk
- Home stadium: Navy–Marine Corps Memorial Stadium

1979 NCAA Division I-A independents football records
	Conf.					Overall
Team	W		L		T	W		L		T
No. 6 Florida State		–		–		11	–	1	–	0
No. 7 Pittsburgh		–		–		11	–	1	–	0
UNLV		–		–		9	–	1	–	2
No. 17 Temple		–		–		10	–	2	–	0
Tulane		–		–		9	–	3	–	0
Rutgers		–		–		8	–	3	–	0
Tennessee State		–		–		8	–	3	–	0
East Carolina		–		–		7	–	3	–	1
No. 20 Penn State		–		–		8	–	4	–	0
South Carolina		–		–		8	–	4	–	0
Navy		–		–		7	–	4	–	0
Notre Dame		–		–		7	–	4	–	0
Southern Miss		–		–		6	–	4	–	1
Syracuse		–		–		7	–	5	–	0
Colgate		–		–		5	–	4	–	1
Boston College		–		–		5	–	6	–	0
Holy Cross		–		–		5	–	6	–	0
Memphis State		–		–		5	–	6	–	0
Miami (FL)		–		–		5	–	6	–	0
North Texas State		–		–		5	–	6	–	0
Villanova		–		–		5	–	6	–	0
Virginia Tech		–		–		5	–	6	–	0
West Virginia		–		–		5	–	6	–	0
Georgia Tech		–		–		4	–	6	–	1
Louisville		–		–		4	–	6	–	1
William & Mary		–		–		4	–	7	–	0
Illinois State		–		–		3	–	8	–	0
Northeast Louisiana		–		–		3	–	8	–	0
Army		–		–		2	–	8	–	1
Air Force		–		–		2	–	9	–	0
Cincinnati		–		–		2	–	9	–	0
Richmond		–		–		0	–	11	–	0
Rankings from AP Poll

The 1979 Navy Midshipmen football team represented the United States Naval Academy as an independent during the 1979 NCAA Division I-A football season. Led by seventh-year head coach George Welsh, the Midshipmen compiled a record of 7–4.

== Schedule ==
Date	Opponent	Rank	Site	Result	Attendance	Source
September 15	The Citadel		Navy–Marine Corps Memorial Stadium; Annapolis, MD	W 26–7	17,835	
September 22	Connecticut		Navy–Marine Corps Memorial Stadium; Annapolis, MD	W 21–10	22,142	
September 29	at Illinois		Memorial Stadium; Champaign, IL	W 13–12	53,825	
October 6	Air Force		Navy–Marine Corps Memorial Stadium; Annapolis, MD (Commander-in-Chief's Trophy)	W 13–9	31,109	
October 13	vs. William & Mary		Foreman Field; Norfolk, VA (Oyster Bowl)	W 24–7	25,000	
October 20	Virginia	No. 20	Navy–Marine Corps Memorial Stadium; Annapolis, MD	W 17–10	22,604	
October 27	at No. 12 Pittsburgh	No. 17	Pitt Stadium; Pittsburgh, PA	L 7–24	51,332	
November 3	at No. 13 Notre Dame		Notre Dame Stadium; Notre Dame, IN (rivalry)	L 0–14	59,075	
November 10	Syracuse		Navy–Marine Corps Memorial Stadium; Annapolis, MD	L 14–30	20,385	
November 17	at Georgia Tech		Grant Field; Atlanta, GA	L 14–24	24,318	
December 1	vs. Army		John F. Kennedy Stadium; Philadelphia, PA (Army–Navy Game)	W 31–7	77,052	
Rankings from AP Poll released prior to the game

== Game summaries ==
=== Air Force ===
Navy had 107 yards of penalties but prevailed 13–9.

=== Vs. Army ===
Army Cadets (2–7–1) vs. Navy Midshipmen (6–4)

Quarter	1	2	3	4	Total
Navy	10	7	7	7	31
Army	0	7	0	0	7

at John F. Kennedy Stadium, Philadelphia, Pennsylvania

- Date: December 1
- Game attendance: 77,052
- TV announcers (ABC): Keith Jackson

Game information

First quarter

- NAVY – Steve Fehr 36-yard field goal. Navy 3–0. Drive:
- NAVY – Troy Mitchell 12-yard pass from Bob Powers (Steve Fehr kick). Navy 10–0. Drive:

Second quarter

- NAVY – Eddie Meyers 1-yard run (Steve Fehr kick). Navy 17–0. Drive:
- ARMY – Bobby Crumpton 8-yard run (Dave Aucoin kick). Navy 17–7. Drive:

Third quarter

- NAVY – Eddie Meyers 5-yard run (Steve Fehr kick). Navy 24–7. Drive:

Fourth quarter

- NAVY – Eddie Meyers 31-yard run (Steve Fehr kick). Navy 31–7. Drive:

Top passers

- NAVY – Bob Powers – 6/15, 85 yards, TD
- ARMY – T.D. Decker – 2/5, 15 yards, INT

Top rushers

- NAVY – Eddie Meyers – 43 rushes, 279 yards, 3 TD
- ARMY – Bobby Vicci – 12 rushes, 66 yards

Top receivers

- NAVY – Steve Callahan – 3 receptions, 40 yards
- ARMY – Bill Skoda – 1 reception, 13 yards

- Navy evened all-time series at 37–37–6
- Eddie Meyers set single game school rushing record

External videos
- Full game
- Game highlights

== Roster ==
1979 Navy Midshipmen football team roster
Players
Coaches
Offense

Pos.	#	Name	Class
OT	65	Jerome Barker	Sr
C	77	Rick Bott	Sr
RB	22	Steve Callahan	Jr
WR	86	Dave Dent	Jr
G	62	Tom Feldman	Sr
QB	19	Mark Fitzgerald	So
RB	25	Duane Flowers	So
TE	87	Curt Gainer	Jr
TE	83	Carl Hendershot	Sr
G	64	Cliff Hagan	So
RB	33	Larry Klawinski	Sr
FB	38	Chris Klein	Sr
G	71	Frank McCallister	Jr
TE	85	Matt McLaughlin	Jr
FB	40	Eddie Meyers	So
WR	89	Troy Mitchell	Fr
TE	82	Greg Papajohn	So
QB	18	Bob Powers	Sr
WR	31	Jon Ross	So
RB	23	Mike Sherlock	Jr
QB	17	Mike Tarquinio	Fr
OT	61	John Taylor	Sr
FB	30	Kevin Tolbert	Jr
OT	79	Richard Welch	Jr

Defense

Pos.	#	Name	Class
DT	73	Steve Chambers	Jr
LB	69	Ted Dumbauld	Jr
DB	14	John Foley	So
DL	54	Terry Huxel	Jr
LB	63	Mike Kronzer	Jr
DT	53	Mike Matthes	Jr
DT	76	John Merrill	Sr
DB	66	Charlie Meyers	Sr
DB	49	Gregg Milo	Sr
DE	88	Hugh Nixon	Sr
LB	55	Tom Paulk	Sr
DB	26	Fred Reitzel	Jr
DE	84	Charlie Thornton	Sr
DE	59	Reggie Trass	Sr
DB	36	Chuck Zingler	Sr
DB		Greg Zitterkopf

Special teams

Pos.	#	Name	Class
K	24	Steve Fehr	So
K	11	Dave Guin	Jr
P	81	Lex Lauletta	Jr

Head coach

- George Welsh

Coordinators/assistant coaches

Legend

- (C) Team captain
- (S) Suspended
- (I) Ineligible
- Injured
- Redshirt
