= 1979 Maryland Terrapins football team =

American college football season

1979 Maryland Terrapins football
- Conference: Atlantic Coast Conference
- Record: 7–4 (4–2 ACC)
- Head coach: Jerry Claiborne (8th season)
- Home stadium: Byrd Stadium

1979 Atlantic Coast Conference football standings
	Conf.					Overall
Team	W		L		T	W		L		T
NC State $	5	–	1	–	0	7	–	4	–	0
Clemson	4	–	2	–	0	8	–	4	–	0
Maryland	4	–	2	–	0	7	–	4	–	0
Wake Forest	3	–	2	–	0	8	–	4	–	0
No. 15 North Carolina	3	–	3	–	0	8	–	3	–	1
Virginia	1	–	4	–	0	6	–	5	–	0
Duke	0	–	6	–	0	2	–	8	–	1
$ – Conference champion; Rankings from AP Poll

The 1979 Maryland Terrapins football team represented the University of Maryland in the 1979 NCAA Division I-A football season. In their eighth season under head coach Jerry Claiborne, the Terrapins compiled a 7–4 record (4–2 in conference), finished in a tie for second place in the Atlantic Coast Conference, and outscored their opponents 198 to 135. The team's statistical leaders included Mike Tice with 897 passing yards, Charlie Wysocki with 1,140 rushing yards, and Joe Carinci with 375 receiving yards.

== Schedule ==
Date	Opponent	Site	Result	Attendance	Source
September 8	Villanova*	Byrd Stadium; College Park, MD	W 24–20	31,684	
September 15	at Clemson	Memorial Stadium; Clemson, SC	W 19–0	52,474	
September 22	Mississippi State*	Byrd Stadium; College Park, MD	W 35–14	37,212	
September 29	at Kentucky*	Commonwealth Stadium; Lexington, KY	L 7–14	57,800	
October 6	Penn State*	Byrd Stadium; College Park, MD (rivalry)	L 7–27	52,348	
October 13	at No. 17 NC State	Carter–Finley Stadium; Raleigh, NC	L 0–7	39,800	
October 20	at Wake Forest	Groves Stadium; Winston-Salem, NC	L 17–25	26,050	
October 27	at Duke	Wallace Wade Stadium; Durham, NC	W 27–0	34,200	
November 3	No. 18 North Carolina	Byrd Stadium; College Park, MD	W 17–14	35,618	
November 17	Louisville*	Byrd Stadium; College Park, MD	W 28–7	25,104	
November 24	Virginia	Byrd Stadium; College Park, MD (rivalry)	W 17–7	26,071	
*Non-conference game; Rankings from AP Poll released prior to the game

== Roster ==
1979 Maryland Terrapins football team roster
Players
Coaches
Offense

Pos.	#	Name	Class
TE	85	Eric Sievers	Sr
TE	82	John Tice	Fr
QB	14	Mike Tice	Jr

Defense

Pos.	#	Name	Class
DT	68	Todd Benson	Jr
DB	25	Lloyd Burruss	Jr

Special teams

Pos.	#	Name	Class

Head coach

- Jerry Claiborne

Coordinators/assistant coaches

Legend

- (C) Team captain
- (S) Suspended
- (I) Ineligible
- Injured
- Redshirt
