= 1979 Army Cadets football team =

American college football season

1979 Army Cadets football
- Conference: Independent
- Record: 2–8–1
- Head coach: Lou Saban (1st season)
- Captain: George Mayes
- Home stadium: Michie Stadium

1979 NCAA Division I-A independents football records
	Conf.					Overall
Team	W		L		T	W		L		T
No. 6 Florida State		–		–		11	–	1	–	0
No. 7 Pittsburgh		–		–		11	–	1	–	0
UNLV		–		–		9	–	1	–	2
No. 17 Temple		–		–		10	–	2	–	0
Tulane		–		–		9	–	3	–	0
Rutgers		–		–		8	–	3	–	0
Tennessee State		–		–		8	–	3	–	0
East Carolina		–		–		7	–	3	–	1
No. 20 Penn State		–		–		8	–	4	–	0
South Carolina		–		–		8	–	4	–	0
Navy		–		–		7	–	4	–	0
Notre Dame		–		–		7	–	4	–	0
Southern Miss		–		–		6	–	4	–	1
Syracuse		–		–		7	–	5	–	0
Colgate		–		–		5	–	4	–	1
Boston College		–		–		5	–	6	–	0
Holy Cross		–		–		5	–	6	–	0
Memphis State		–		–		5	–	6	–	0
Miami (FL)		–		–		5	–	6	–	0
North Texas State		–		–		5	–	6	–	0
Villanova		–		–		5	–	6	–	0
Virginia Tech		–		–		5	–	6	–	0
West Virginia		–		–		5	–	6	–	0
Georgia Tech		–		–		4	–	6	–	1
Louisville		–		–		4	–	6	–	1
William & Mary		–		–		4	–	7	–	0
Illinois State		–		–		3	–	8	–	0
Northeast Louisiana		–		–		3	–	8	–	0
Army		–		–		2	–	8	–	1
Air Force		–		–		2	–	9	–	0
Cincinnati		–		–		2	–	9	–	0
Richmond		–		–		0	–	11	–	0
Rankings from AP Poll

The 1979 Army Cadets football team represented the United States Military Academy as an independent during the 1979 NCAA Division I-A football season. Led by Lou Saban in his first and only season as head coach, Army finished the season with a record of 2–8–1.

== Schedule ==
Date	Opponent	Site	Result	Attendance	Source
September 15	Connecticut	Michie Stadium; West Point, NY	W 26–10	31,727	
September 22	at Stanford	Stanford Stadium; Stanford, CA	W 17–13	43,345	
September 29	North Carolina	Michie Stadium; West Point, NY	L 3–41	32,157	
October 6	Duke	Michie Stadium; West Point, NY	T 17–17	33,874	
October 13	at Penn State	Beaver Stadium; University Park, PA	L 3–24	77,157	
October 20	Baylor	Michie Stadium; West Point, NY	L 0–55	32,591	
October 27	Boston College	Michie Stadium; West Point, NY	L 16–29	40,162	
November 3	at Air Force	Falcon Stadium; Colorado Springs, CO (Commander-in-Chief's Trophy)	L 7–28	30,334	
November 10	vs. Rutgers	Giants Stadium; East Rutherford, NJ	L 0–20	28,163	
November 17	No. 11 Pittsburgh	Michie Stadium; West Point, NY	L 0–40	31,689	
December 1	vs. Navy	John F. Kennedy Stadium; Philadelphia, PA (Army–Navy Game)	L 7–31	77,052	
Rankings from AP Poll released prior to the game

== Game summaries ==
=== At Penn State ===
Army Cadets (2–1–1) at Penn State Nittany Lions (2–2)

Quarter	1	2	3	4	Total
Army	0	0	3	0	3
Penn State	7	10	0	7	24

at Beaver Stadium, University Park, Pennsylvania

- Date: October 13
- Game attendance: 77,157

Game information

First quarter

- PSU – Booker Moore 1-yard run (Herb Menhardt kick). Penn State 7–0. Drive: 6 plays, 38 yards.

Second quarter

- PSU – Matt Suhey 17-yard run (Herb Menhardt kick), 7:06. Penn State 14–0. Drive: 4 plays, 57 yards.
- PSU – Herb Menhardt 24-yard field goal, 2:36. Penn State 17–0. Drive:

Third quarter

- ARMY – Dave Aucoin 44-yard field goal. Penn State 17–3. Drive:

Fourth quarter

- PSU – Matt Suhey 61-yard run (Herb Menhardt kick). Penn State 24–3. Drive:

Top passers

- ARMY – Jerryl Bennett – 7/26, 120 yards, INT
- PSU – Dayle Tate – 6/14, 51 yards, 3 INT

Top rushers

- ARMY – Jimmy Hill – 23 rushes, 43 yards
- PSU – Matt Suhey – 23 carries, 225 yards, 2 TD

Top receivers

- ARMY – Kevin Kullander – 3 receptions, 89 yards
- PSU – Booker Moore – 3 receptions, 28 yards

=== Vs. Navy ===
Army Cadets (2–7–1) vs. Navy Midshipmen (6–4)

Quarter	1	2	3	4	Total
Navy	10	7	7	7	31
Army	0	7	0	0	7

at John F. Kennedy Stadium, Philadelphia, Pennsylvania

- Date: December 1
- Game attendance: 77,052
- TV announcers (ABC): Keith Jackson

Game information

First quarter

- NAVY – Steve Fehr 36-yard field goal. Navy 3–0. Drive:
- NAVY – Troy Mitchell 12-yard pass from Bob Powers (Steve Fehr kick). Navy 10–0. Drive:

Second quarter

- NAVY – Eddie Meyers 1-yard run (Steve Fehr kick). Navy 17–0. Drive:
- ARMY – Bobby Crumpton 8-yard run (Dave Aucoin kick). Navy 17–7. Drive:

Third quarter

- NAVY – Eddie Meyers 5-yard run (Steve Fehr kick). Navy 24–7. Drive:

Fourth quarter

- NAVY – Eddie Meyers 31-yard run (Steve Fehr kick). Navy 31–7. Drive:

Top passers

- NAVY – Bob Powers – 6/15, 85 yards, TD
- ARMY – T.D. Decker – 2/5, 15 yards, INT

Top rushers

- NAVY – Eddie Meyers – 43 rushes, 279 yards, 3 TD
- ARMY – Bobby Vicci – 12 rushes, 66 yards

Top receivers

- NAVY – Steve Callahan – 3 receptions, 40 yards
- ARMY – Bill Skoda – 1 reception, 13 yards

External videos
- Full game
- Game highlights

== Roster ==
1979 Army Cadets football team roster
Players
Coaches
Offense

Pos.	#	Name	Class
QB	17	Rob Bauder	So
QB	16	Jerryl Bennett	So
G	64	Mike Bristol	Jr
G	66	Chuck Boucher	Sr
OT	77	Steve Carter	Jr
RB	49	Bobby Crumpton	Fr
QB	11	T.D. Decker	Jr
C	52	Dan Enright	So
WR	88	Mike Fahnestock	Jr
RB	46	Robbie Hall	So
RB	45	Dino Harris	So
FB	39	Rob Heather	So
G	62	Matt Herholtz	Jr
RB	47	Jimmy Hill	Jr
WR	37	Glenn Hoy	Fr
TE	38	Kevin Kullander	So
TE	85	Mark McKearn	Jr
QB	10	Earle Mulrane	Sr
C	50	Ed Perkins	Sr
WR	82	Larry Pruitt	Fr
QB	14	Bob Ryan
G	73	Jim Sharman	So
RB	42	Bobby Shields	Jr
TE	90	Gene Skinner
WR	29	Bill Skoda	Sr
OT	76	Cliff Triplett	Sr
FB	32	Bobby Vicci	Jr
HB	40	Gerald Walker	Fr
OT	71	Bill Wilhelm	Jr

Defense

Pos.	#	Name	Class
DB	18	Dave Charest	Sr
DB	23	Jeff Cook	Jr
DT	69	Kevin Dodson	So
DB	33	Bruce Elliott	Jr
LB	53	John Garrison	So
DB	13	Jon Hallingstad	Jr
LB	80	John Hilliard	Jr
LB	65	Doug Lenhoff	Sr
DB	19	Dale Love	So
DL	72	Stan March	Jr
DL	55	George Mayes
LB	96	Willie Nattiel
LB	92	Len Sbrocco	Jr
DT	85	Kevin Streets	Jr
DE	59	Charles Swanson	So
LB	43	Pat Sweeney	So
LB	94	Larry Trumbore	Sr
DB	24	Dan Webb	Jr
LB	86	Bob Wood	Fr
DB	28	Chris Zawie	Fr

Special teams

Pos.	#	Name	Class
P	93	Charlie Adams	Sr
K	95	Dave Aucoin	So

Head coach

- Lou Saban

Coordinators/assistant coaches

Legend

- (C) Team captain
- (S) Suspended
- (I) Ineligible
- Injured
- Redshirt
