= 1979 Rutgers Scarlet Knights football team =

American college football season

1979 Rutgers Scarlet Knights football
- Conference: Independent
- Record: 8–3
- Head coach: Frank R. Burns (7th season)
- Home stadium: Rutgers Stadium; Giants Stadium

1979 NCAA Division I-A independents football records
	Conf.					Overall
Team	W		L		T	W		L		T
No. 6 Florida State		–		–		11	–	1	–	0
No. 7 Pittsburgh		–		–		11	–	1	–	0
UNLV		–		–		9	–	1	–	2
No. 17 Temple		–		–		10	–	2	–	0
Tulane		–		–		9	–	3	–	0
Rutgers		–		–		8	–	3	–	0
Tennessee State		–		–		8	–	3	–	0
East Carolina		–		–		7	–	3	–	1
No. 20 Penn State		–		–		8	–	4	–	0
South Carolina		–		–		8	–	4	–	0
Navy		–		–		7	–	4	–	0
Notre Dame		–		–		7	–	4	–	0
Southern Miss		–		–		6	–	4	–	1
Syracuse		–		–		7	–	5	–	0
Colgate		–		–		5	–	4	–	1
Boston College		–		–		5	–	6	–	0
Holy Cross		–		–		5	–	6	–	0
Memphis State		–		–		5	–	6	–	0
Miami (FL)		–		–		5	–	6	–	0
North Texas State		–		–		5	–	6	–	0
Villanova		–		–		5	–	6	–	0
Virginia Tech		–		–		5	–	6	–	0
West Virginia		–		–		5	–	6	–	0
Georgia Tech		–		–		4	–	6	–	1
Louisville		–		–		4	–	6	–	1
William & Mary		–		–		4	–	7	–	0
Illinois State		–		–		3	–	8	–	0
Northeast Louisiana		–		–		3	–	8	–	0
Army		–		–		2	–	8	–	1
Air Force		–		–		2	–	9	–	0
Cincinnati		–		–		2	–	9	–	0
Richmond		–		–		0	–	11	–	0
Rankings from AP Poll

The 1979 Rutgers Scarlet Knights football team represented Rutgers University as an independent during the 1979 NCAA Division I-A football season. In their seventh season under head coach Frank R. Burns, the Scarlet Knights compiled an 8-3 record while competing as an independent. The team outscored its opponents 243 to 174. Against ranked opponents, the team lost, 45–10, to No. 7 Penn State and defeated No. 17 Tennessee, 13–7. The team's statistical leaders included Ed McMichael with 1,529 passing yards, Albert Ray with 567 rushing yards, and David Dorn with 468 receiving yards.

== Schedule ==
Date	Opponent	Site	Result	Attendance	Source
September 8	Holy Cross	Rutgers Stadium; Piscataway, NJ	W 28–0	18,350	
September 15	at No. 7 Penn State	Beaver Stadium; University Park, PA	L 10–45	77,309	
September 22	Bucknell	Rutgers Stadium; Piscataway, NJ	W 16–14	12,300	
September 29	at Princeton	Palmer Stadium; Princeton, NJ (rivalry)	W 38–14	23,523	
October 6	Temple	Rutgers Stadium; Piscataway, NJ	L 20–41	20,245	
October 13	at Connecticut	Memorial Stadium; Storrs, CT	W 26–14	7,762	
October 20	at William & Mary	Cary Field; Williamsburg, VA	W 24–0	16,020	
November 3	at No. 17 Tennessee	Neyland Stadium; Knoxville, TN	W 13–7	84,265	
November 10	vs. Army	Giants Stadium; East Rutherford, NJ	W 20–0	28,163	
November 17	Villanova	Rutgers Stadium; Piscataway, NJ	L 17–32	19,700	
November 25	at Louisville	Cardinal Stadium; Louisville, KY	W 31–7	10,152	
Rankings from AP Poll released prior to the game

== Roster ==
1979 Rutgers Scarlet Knights football team roster
Players
Coaches
Offense

Pos.	#	Name	Class
WR	14	Dave Dorn	Jr
QB	8	Bob Hering	Sr
QB	2	Ed McMichael	Jr

Defense

Pos.	#	Name	Class
S	18	Deron Cherry	Jr
DT	74	Dino Mangiero	Sr
DT	66	Bill Pickel	Fr

Special teams

Pos.	#	Name	Class

Head coach

- Frank R. Burns

Coordinators/assistant coaches

- Greg Gigantino
  (Graduate assistant)

Legend

- (C) Team captain
- (S) Suspended
- (I) Ineligible
- Injured
- Redshirt
