= Dick Bestwick =

American football coach and administrator (1930–2018)

Biographical details
- Born: August 18, 1930; Grove City, Pennsylvania, U.S.
- Died: January 4, 2018 (aged 87); Athens, Georgia, U.S.

Playing career

Football
- 1949–1951: North Carolina
- Position: Guard

Coaching career (HC unless noted)

Football
- 1953–1955: Montoursville HS (PA)
- 1956: North Huntingdon HS (PA)
- 1957–1961: Grove City HS (PA)
- 1962: Oberlin (line)
- 1963–1964: Westminster (PA) (DL)
- 1965: South Carolina (DL)
- 1966: Pittsburgh (assistant)
- 1967–1975: Georgia Tech (assistant)
- 1976–1981: Virginia

Wrestling
- 1962–1963: Oberlin

Administrative career (AD unless noted)
- 1982–1983: Dallas Cowboys (scout)
- 1983–1985: Missouri (assistant AD)
- 1985–1986: Peach Bowl (exec. dir.)
- 1986–1988: Georgia (assistant AD)
- 1988: South Carolina
- 1990–2000: Georgia (associate AD)

Head coaching record
- Overall: 16–49–1 (college football)

Dick Bestwick (August 18, 1930 – January 4, 2018) was an American football coach, scout, and college athletics administrator. He served as the head football coach of the University of Virginia from 1976 to 1981, compiling a record of 16–49–1. A native of Grove City, Pennsylvania, he played college football at the University of North Carolina at Chapel Hill, graduating from the school in 1952. Bestwick received his Masters in Education from Pennsylvania State University. Prior to his tenure at Virginia, Bestwick spent 1954 to 1962 as a high school football coach at three different schools including his alma mater, Grove City High School, and 1967 to 1975 as an assistant coach at Georgia Institute of Technology. Bestwick was hired as the head football coach at Marshall University in 1971 after the 1970 plane crash that took the lives of most of the university's football team and coaching staff. He left the position after two days on the job and returned to Georgia Tech.

== Scouting and administrative career ==
After his time at Virginia he became a national scout for the Dallas Cowboys of the National Football League (NFL) from 1982 to 1983, assistant athletic director at the University of Missouri from 1983 to 1985 and the executive director of the Peach Bowl from 1985 to 1986. He served as the assistant athletic director at University of Georgia from 1986 to 1988, athletic director at the University of South Carolina in 1988, returned to Georgia as associate athletic director in 1990, and finally retiring as a senior associate athletic director in 2000. He was the father of three children, with five grandchildren.

== Honors and awards ==
Bestiwck was inducted into the Peach Bowl Hall of Fame in 2002. The Dick Bestwick Award for the male athlete graduating with the highest GPA at the University of Georgia was named in his honor.

== Death ==
Bestwick died on January 4, 2018, in Athens, Georgia after suffering from transverse myelitis.

== Head coaching record ==
=== College football ===
Year	Team	Overall	Conference	Standing	Bowl/playoffs
Virginia Cavaliers (Atlantic Coast Conference) (1976–1981)
1976	Virginia	2–9	1–3	6th	
1977	Virginia	1–9–1	1–5	6th	
1978	Virginia	2–9	0–6	7th	
1979	Virginia	6–5	1–4	6th	
1980	Virginia	4–7	2–4	T–4th	
1981	Virginia	1–10	0–6	7th	
Virginia:		16–49–1	5–28		
Total:		16–49–1			
