= 1979 Big Ten Conference football season =

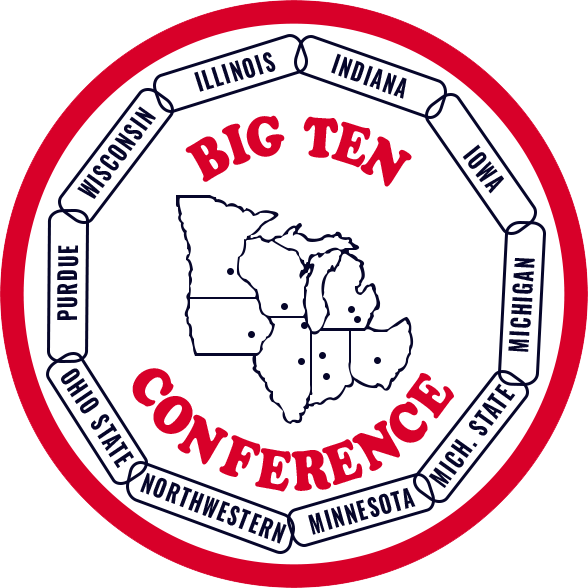
- Sport: American football
- Teams: 10
- Top draft pick: Curtis Greer
- Champion: Ohio State
- Runners-up: Purdue
- Season MVP: Tim Clifford

Seasons

1979 Big Ten Conference football standings
	Conf.					Overall
Team	W		L		T	W		L		T
No. 4 Ohio State $	8	–	0	–	0	11	–	1	–	0
No. 10 Purdue	7	–	1	–	0	10	–	2	–	0
No. 18 Michigan	6	–	2	–	0	8	–	4	–	0
No. 19 Indiana	5	–	3	–	0	8	–	4	–	0
Iowa	4	–	4	–	0	5	–	6	–	0
Minnesota	3	–	5	–	1	4	–	6	–	1
Michigan State	3	–	5	–	0	5	–	6	–	0
Wisconsin	3	–	5	–	0	4	–	7	–	0
Illinois	1	–	6	–	1	2	–	8	–	1
Northwestern	0	–	9	–	0	1	–	10	–	0
$ – Conference champion; Rankings from AP Poll

The 1979 Big Ten Conference football season was the 84th season of college football played by the member schools of the Big Ten Conference and was a part of the 1979 NCAA Division I-A football season.

The 1979 Ohio State Buckeyes football team compiled an 11–1 record, won the Big Ten championship, lost to USC in the 1980 Rose Bowl, and was ranked No. 4 in the final AP and UPI polls. Quarterback Art Schlichter led the team with 2,246 yards of total offense, finished fourth in the Heisman Trophy voting, and was selected as a first-team All-American by the NEA and The Sporting News. Offensive guard Ken Fritz was a consensus All-American. Earl Bruce, in his first year as head coach, was selected as the Big Ten Coach of the Year. Doug Donley led the Big Ten with 800 receiving yards, and Vlade Janakievski led the conference with 97 points scored. Defensive lineman Jim Laughlin was selected as the team's most valuable player.

The 1979 Purdue Boilermakers football team, under head coach Jim Young, finished in second place in the Big Ten, compiled a 10–2 record, defeated Tennessee in the 1979 Astro-Bluebonnet Bowl, led the conference in both scoring offense (32.5 points per game) and scoring defense (10.5 points allowed per game), and was ranked No. 10 in the final AP and UPI polls. Quarterback Mark Herrmann led the conference with 2,377 passing yards and finished eighth in the Heisman Trophy voting. Tight end Dave Young was selected as the team's most valuable player.

The 1979 Michigan Wolverines football team, under head coach Bo Schembechler, compiled an 8–4 record, finished third in the Big Ten, lost to North Carolina in the 1979 Gator Bowl, and was ranked No. 18 in the final AP poll. Linebacker Ron Simpkins was selected as the team's most valuable player and as a consensus All-American. Defensive end Curtis Greer was also selected as a first-team All-American by multiple selectors. Butch Woolfolk ranked second in the Big Ten with 990 rushing yards.

== Season overview ==
=== Results and team statistics ===
Conf. Rank	Team	Head coach	AP final	AP high	Overall record	Conf. record	PPG	PAG	MVP
1	Ohio State	Earle Bruce	#4	#1	11–1	8–0	**32.5**	**10.5**	Jim Laughlin
2	Purdue	Jim Young	#10	#5	10–2	7–1	23.9	18.8	Dave Young
3	Michigan	Bo Schembechler	#18	#6	8–4	6–2	26.0	12.6	Ron Simpkins
4	Indiana	Lee Corso	#19	#19	8–4	5–3	26.2	21.0	**Tim Clifford**
5	Iowa	Hayden Fry	NR	NR	5–6	4–4	21.7	19.6	Dennis Mosley
6	Minnesota	Joe Salem	NR	NR	4–6–1	3–5–1	24.0	24.6	Mark Carlson
7 (tie)	Michigan State	Darryl Rogers	NR	#7	5–6	3–5	21.8	23.0	Danny Bass
7 (tie)	Wisconsin	Dave McClain	NR	NR	4–7	3–5	18.9	28.3	Tom Stauss
9	Illinois	Gary Moeller	NR	NR	2–8–1	1–6–1	14.2	24.2	L. McCullough
10	Northwestern	Rick Venturi	NR	NR	1–10	0–9	10.5	35.1	Chuck Kern

Key
AP final = Team's rank in the final AP Poll of the 1979 season
AP high = Team's highest rank in the AP Poll throughout the 1979 season
PPG = Average of points scored per game; conference leader's average displayed in bold
PAG = Average of points allowed per game; conference leader's average displayed in bold
MVP = Most valuable player as voted by players on each team as part of the voting process to determine the winner of the Chicago Tribune Silver Football trophy; trophy winner in bold

=== Regular season ===
==== September 8 ====
On September 8, 1979, the Big Ten football teams played four conference games and two non-conference games. The non-conference games resulted in two wins.

- Purdue 41, Wisconsin 20
- Michigan 49, Northwestern 7
- Indiana 30, Iowa 26
- Michigan State 33, Illinois 16
- Ohio State 31, Syracuse 8
- Minnesota 24, Ohio 10

==== September 15 ====
On September 15, 1979, the Big Ten teams played one conference games and eight non-conference games. The non-conference games resulted in four wins and four losses, giving the Big Ten a 6–4 record to that point in the season.

- Ohio State 21, Minnesota 17
- UCLA 31, Purdue 21
- Notre Dame 12, Michigan 10
- Indiana 44, Vanderbilt 13
- Oklahoma 21, Iowa 6
- Michigan State 41, Oregon 17
- Wisconsin 38, Air Force 0
- Missouri 14, Illinois 6
- Northwestern 27, Wyoming 22

==== September 22 ====
On September 22, 1979, the Big Ten teams played 10 non-conference games, resulting in six wins and four losses. The results gave the Big Ten a 12–8 record to that point in the season

- Ohio State 45, Washington State 29
- Purdue 28, Notre Dame 22
- Michigan 28, Kansas 7
- Indiana 18, Kentucky 10
- Nebraska 24, Iowa 21
- USC 48, Minnesota 14
- Michigan State 24, Miami (OH) 21
- UCLA 37, Wisconsin 12
- Illinois 27, Air Force 19
- Syracuse 54, Northwestern 21

==== September 29 ====
On September 29, 1979, the Big Ten teams played one conference game and eight non-conference games. The non-conference games resulted in four wins and four losses, giving the Big Ten a 16–12 record to that point in the season.

- Minnesota 38, Northwestern 8
- Ohio State 17, UCLA 13
- Purdue 13, Oregon 7
- Michigan 14, California 10
- Colorado 17, Indiana 16
- Iowa 30, Iowa State 14
- Notre Dame 27, Michigan State 3
- San Diego State 24, Wisconsin 17
- Navy 13, Illinois 12

==== October 6 ====
On October 6, 1979, the Big Ten teams played five conference games.

- Ohio State 16, Northwestern 7
- Minnesota 31, Purdue 14
- Michigan 21, Michigan State 7
- Indiana 3, Wisconsin 0
- Iowa 13, Illinois 7

==== October 13 ====
On October 13, 1979, the Big Ten teams played five conference games.

- Ohio State 47, Indiana 6
- Purdue 28, Illinois 14
- Michigan 31, Minnesota 21
- Iowa 58, Northwestern 6
- Wisconsin 38, Michigan State 29

==== October 20 ====
On October 20, 1979, the Big Ten teams played five conference games.

- Ohio State 59, Wisconsin 0
- Purdue 14, Michigan State 7
- Michigan 27, Illinois 7
- Indiana 30, Northwestern 0
- Minnesota 24, Iowa 7

==== October 27 ====
On October 27, 1979, the Big Ten teams played five conference games.

- Ohio State 42, Michigan State 0
- Purdue 20, Northwestern 16
- Michigan 27, Indiana 21
- Iowa 24, Wisconsin 13
- Illinois 17, Minnesota 17

==== November 3 ====
On November 3, 1979, the Big Ten teams played five conference games.

- Ohio State 44, Illinois 7
- Purdue 20, Iowa 14
- Michigan 54, Wisconsin 0
- Indiana 42, Minnesota 24
- Michigan State 42, Northwestern 7

==== November 10 ====
On November 10, 1979, the Big Ten teams played five conference games.

- Ohio State 34, Iowa 7
- Purdue 24, Michigan 21
- Indiana 45, Illinois 14
- Minnesota 31, Michigan State 17
- Wisconsin 28, Northwestern 3

==== November 17 ====
On November 17, 1979, the Big Ten teams played five conference games.

- Ohio State 18, Michigan 15
- Purdue 37, Indiana 21
- Iowa 33, Michigan State 23
- Wisconsin 42, Minnesota 37
- Illinois 29, Northwestern 13

== Statistical leaders ==
=== Passing yards ===
1. Mark Herrmann, Purdue (2,377)
2. Mark Carlson, Minnesota (2,188)
3. Tim Clifford, Indiana (2,078)
4. Art Schlichter, Ohio State (1,816)
5. John Wangler, Michigan (1,431)

=== Rushing yards ===
1. Dennis Mosley, Iowa (1,267)
2. Butch Woolfolk, Michigan (990)
3. Steve Smith, Michigan State (972)
4. Calvin Murray, Ohio State (872)
5. Garry White, Minnesota (861)

=== Receiving yards ===
1. Doug Donley, Ohio State (800)
2. Tom Stauss, Wisconsin (660)
3. Todd Sheets, Northwestern (614)
4. Doug Marsh, Michigan (612)
5. Bart Burrell, Purdue (607)

=== Total offense ===
1. Art Schlichter, Ohio State (2,246)
2. Tim Clifford, Indiana (2,158)
3. Mark Carlson, Minnesota (2,149)
4. Mark Herrmann, Purdue (2,094)
5. John Wangler, Michigan (1,455)

=== Passing efficiency rating ===
1. Art Schlichter, Ohio State (145.9)
2. Mark Carlson, Minnesota (125.7)
3. Tim Clifford, Indiana (Indiana 124.1)
4. Mark Herrmann, Purdue (120.0)
5. Phil Suess, Iowa (118.0)

=== Rushing yards per attempt ===
1. Garry White, Minnesota (6.4)
2. Ben McCall, Purdue (5.6)
3. Lawrence Reid, Michigan (5.4)
4. Mike Holmes, Illinois (5.4)
5. Derek Hughes, Michigan State (5.3)

=== Yards per reception ===
1. Doug Donley, Ohio State (21.6)
2. Gary Williams, Ohio State (19.2)
3. Eugene Byrd, Michigan State (18.6)
4. Doug Marsh, Michigan (18.5)
5. Tom Stauss, Wisconsin (17.4)

=== Points scored ===
1. Vlade Janakievski, Ohio State (97)
2. Dennis Mosley, Iowa (96)
3. Butch Woolfolk, Michigan (78)
4. Marion Barber, Jr., Minnesota (72)
5. Derek Hughes, Michigan State (66)

== Awards and honors ==
=== All-Big Ten honors ===
The following players were picked by the Associated Press (AP) and/or the United Press International (UPI) as first-team players on the 1979 All-Big Ten Conference football team.

Offense

Position	Name	Team	Selectors
Quarterback	Art Schlichter	Ohio State	AP, UPI
Running back	Dennis Mosley	Iowa	AP, UPI
Running back	Butch Woolfolk	Michigan	AP, UPI
Fullback	Dave Mohapp	Ohio State	UPI
Split end	Elmer Bailey	Minnesota	AP
Flanker	Doug Donley	Wisconsin	AP, UPI
Tight end	Dave Young	Purdue	AP
Tight end	Mark Brammer	Michigan State	UPI
Center	Jay Hilgenberg	Iowa	AP
Center	Tom Waugh	Ohio State	UPI
Guard	Ken Fritz	Ohio State	AP, UPI
Guard	Dale Schwan	Purdue	AP
Guard	John Arbeznik	Michigan	UPI
Tackle	Steve McKenzie	Purdue	AP, UPI
Tackle	Ray Snell	Wisconsin	AP, UPI

Defense

Position	Name	Team	Selectors
Defensive line	Curtis Greer	Michigan	AP, UPI
Defensive line	Ken Loushin	Purdue	AP, UPI
Defensive line	Keena Turner	Purdue	AP
Defensive line	Luther Henson	Ohio State	UPI
Defensive line	Calvin Clark	Purdue	AP
Defensive line	Jim Laughlin	Ohio State	AP, UPI [linebacker]
Defensive line	Mike Trgovac	Michigan	UPI
Linebacker	Ron Simpkins	Michigan	AP, UPI
Linebacker	Dan Bass	Michigan State	AP, UPI
Linebacker	Leven Weiss	Iowa	AP
Defensive back	Mike Guess	Ohio State	AP, UPI
Defensive back	Mike Jolly	Michigan	AP, UPI
Defensive back	Tim Wilbur	Indiana	AP
Defensive back	Todd Bell	Ohio State	UPI
Defensive back	Vince Skillings	Ohio State	UPI

=== All-American honors ===
At the end of the 1979 season, two Big Ten players were consensus first-team picks for the 1979 College Football All-America Team. The Big Ten's consensus All-Americans were:

Position	Name	Team	Selectors
Offensive guard	Ken Fritz	Ohio State	AP, FWAA, UPI, NEA, WCFF
Linebacker	Ron Simpkins	Michigan	AP, FWAA, UPI, WCFF

Other Big Ten players who were named first-team All-Americans by at least one selector were:

Position	Name	Team	Selectors
Quarterback	Art Schlichter	Ohio State	NEA, TSN
Offensive guard	Ray Snell	Wisconsin	TSN
Defensive end	Curtis Greer	Michigan	AFCA, FWAA, NEA

=== Other awards ===
- Heisman Trophy voting: Ohio State quarterback Art Schlichter (fourth); and Purdue quarterback Mark Herrmann (eighth)
- Big Ten Coach of the Year: Earle Bruce of Ohio State.

== 1979 NFL draft ==
The 1980 NFL draft was held in New York on April 29–30, 1979. The following players were among the first 100 picks:

Name	Position	Team	Round	Overall pick
Curtis Greer	Defensive end	Michigan	1	6
Ray Snell	Guard	Wisconsin	1	22
Doug Marsh	Tight end	Michigan	2	33
Angelo Fields	Offensive tackle	Michigan State	2	38
Keena Turner	Linebacker	Purdue	2	39
Ralph Clayton	Wide receiver	Michigan	2	47
Mike Fried	Wide receiver	Indiana	3	62
Mark Brammer	Tight end	Michigan State	3	67
Ray Sydnor	Tight end	Wisconsin	3	83
Jim Laughlin	Linebacker	Ohio State	4	91
Mike Jolly	Defensive back	Michigan	4	96
Elmer Bailey	Wide receiver	Minnesota	4	100
