= 1979 Ohio State Buckeyes football team =

American college football season

1979 Ohio State Buckeyes football

Big Ten champion

Rose Bowl, L 16–17 vs. USC
- Conference: Big Ten Conference

Ranking
- Coaches: No. 4
- AP: No. 4
- Record: 11–1 (8–0 Big Ten)
- Head coach: Earle Bruce (1st season)
- Defensive coordinator: Dennis Fryzel (1st season)
- MVP: Jim Laughlin
- Captains: Ken Fritz; Mike Guess; Jim Laughlin; Tom Waugh
- Home stadium: Ohio Stadium

1979 Big Ten Conference football standings
	Conf.					Overall
Team	W		L		T	W		L		T
No. 4 Ohio State $	8	–	0	–	0	11	–	1	–	0
No. 10 Purdue	7	–	1	–	0	10	–	2	–	0
No. 18 Michigan	6	–	2	–	0	8	–	4	–	0
No. 19 Indiana	5	–	3	–	0	8	–	4	–	0
Iowa	4	–	4	–	0	5	–	6	–	0
Minnesota	3	–	5	–	1	4	–	6	–	1
Michigan State	3	–	5	–	0	5	–	6	–	0
Wisconsin	3	–	5	–	0	4	–	7	–	0
Illinois	1	–	6	–	1	2	–	8	–	1
Northwestern	0	–	9	–	0	1	–	10	–	0
$ – Conference champion; Rankings from AP Poll

The 1979 Ohio State Buckeyes football team was an American football team that represented the Ohio State University as a member of the Big Ten Conference during the 1979 Big Ten season. In their first season under head coach Earl Bruce, the Buckeyes compiled an 11–1 record (8–0 in conference games), won the Big Ten championship, and outscored opponents by a total of 374 to 109. They were undefeated in the regular season, including victories over No. 17 UCLA and No. 13 Michigan, and were ranked No. 1 in the AP poll at the end of the regular season. The Buckeyes represented the Big Ten in the 1980 Rose Bowl where they lost, 17–16, to No. 3 USC. They were ranked No. 4 in the final AP poll.

The Buckeyes gained an average of 240.3 rushing yards and 134.0 passing yards per game. On defense, they held opponents to 120.8 rushing yards and 127.2 passing yards per game. Quarterback Art Schlichter completed 94 of 179 passes (52.5%) for 1,519 yards and 13 touchdowns. He also tallied for 436 rushing yards and nine rushing touchdowns. The team's other statistical leaders included running back Calvin Murray (799 rushing yards, 5.2 yards per carry) and wide receiver Doug Donley (33 receptions for 690 yards, 20.9 yards per reception). Guard Ken Fritz was a consensus first-team All-American. Art Schlichter also received first-team All-America honors from the Newspaper Enterprise Association (NEA) and The Sporting News.

The team played its home games at Ohio Stadium in Columbus, Ohio.

== Schedule ==
Date	Time	Opponent	Rank	Site	TV	Result	Attendance	Source
September 8	1:30 p.m.	Syracuse*		Ohio Stadium; Columbus, OH		W 31–8	86,205	
September 15	2:30 p.m.	at Minnesota	No. 15	Memorial Stadium; Minneapolis, MN		W 21–17	43,926	
September 22	1:30 p.m.	Washington State*	No. 16	Ohio Stadium; Columbus, OH		W 45–29	87,495	
September 29	4:00 p.m.	at No. 17 UCLA*	No. 14	Los Angeles Memorial Coliseum; Los Angeles, CA	ABC	W 17–13	47,228	
October 6	1:30 p.m.	Northwestern	No. 8	Ohio Stadium; Columbus, OH		W 16–7	87,406	
October 13	1:30 p.m.	Indiana	No. 8	Ohio Stadium; Columbus, OH		W 47–6	87,521	
October 20	1:30 p.m.	Wisconsin	No. 6	Ohio Stadium; Columbus, OH		W 59–0	87,585	
October 27	1:30 p.m.	Michigan State^{†}	No. 4	Ohio Stadium; Columbus, OH		W 42–0	87,747	
November 3	2:00 p.m.	at Illinois	No. 5	Memorial Stadium; Champaign, IL (Illibuck)		W 44–7	41,870	
November 10	1:00 p.m.	Iowa	No. 3	Ohio Stadium; Columbus, OH		W 34–7	87,835	
November 17	12:30 p.m.	at No. 13 Michigan	No. 2	Michigan Stadium; Ann Arbor, MI (rivalry)	ABC	W 18–15	106,255	
January 1, 1980	5:00 p.m.	vs. No. 3 USC*	No. 1	Rose Bowl; Pasadena, CA (Rose Bowl)	NBC	L 16–17	105,526	
*Non-conference game; ^{†}Homecoming; Rankings from AP Poll released prior to the game; All times are in Eastern time

== Roster ==
1979 Ohio State Buckeyes football team roster
Players
Coaches
Offense

Pos.	#	Name	Class
WR	47	Doug Donley	Jr
G	56	Ken Fritz	Sr
QB	10	Art Schlichter	So
RB	46	Tim Spencer	Fr

Defense

Pos.	#	Name	Class
CB	25	Todd Bell	Jr
CB	27	Ray Ellis	Jr
LB	65	Keith Ferguson	Jr
LB	5	Jim Laughlin	Sr

Special teams

Pos.	#	Name	Class
K	13	Vlade Janakievski	Sr
P	19	Tom Orosz	Jr

Head coach

- Earle Bruce

Coordinators/assistant coaches

- Dennis Fryzel (DC)
- Pete Carroll (DB)

Legend

- (C) Team captain
- (S) Suspended
- (I) Ineligible
- Injured
- Redshirt

Roster

== Depth chart ==
Defense

FS
Vince Skillings
Bob Murphy
⋅

WLB	ILB	ILB	SLB
Jim Laughlin	Al Washington	Marcus Marek	Keith Ferguson
Ben Lee	⋅	⋅	⋅
⋅	⋅	⋅	⋅

ROV
Todd Bell
⋅
⋅

CB
Mike Guess
Doyle Lewis
⋅

DE	NT	DE
Jerome Foster	Tim Sawicki	Luther Henson
Reggie Echols	Mark Sullivan	Gary Dulin
⋅	⋅	⋅

CB
Ray Ellis
Norm Burrows
⋅

Offense

SE
Gary Williams
Chuck Hunter
⋅

LT	LG	C	RG	RT
Tim Burke	Ernie Andria	Tom Waugh	Ken Fritz	Joe Lukens
Tom Levenick	Scott Burris	Jim DeLeone	Joe Smith	Tom Levenick
⋅	⋅	⋅	⋅	⋅

TE
Brad Dwelle
Bill Jaco
Ron Barwig

FL
Doug Donley
Tyrone Hicks
⋅

QB
Art Schlichter
Greg Castignola
⋅

FB
Ricardo Volley
Paul Campbell
Cliff Belmer

Special teams
PK Vlade Janakievski
P Tom Orosz

LS John Hutchings

RB
Calvin Murray
Jimmy Gayle
Tim Spencer

== Coaching staff ==
- Earle Bruce - Head Coach (1st year)
- Pete Carroll - Defensive Backs (1st year)
- Dennis Fryzel - Defensive Coordinator (1st year)
- Glen Mason - Offensive Line / Defensive Inside Linebackers (2nd year)
- Bill Myles - Offensive Line (3rd year)
- Wayne Stanley - Running Backs (1st year)
- Steve Szabo - Defensive Line (1st year)
- Bob Tucker - Defensive Outside Linebackers (1st year)
- Fred Zechman - Quarterbacks/Receivers (1st year)

== 1980 NFL draftees ==
Player	Round	Pick	Position	NFL club
Jim Laughlin	4	91	Linebacker	Atlanta Falcons
Mike Guess	6	156	Defensive Back	Chicago Bears
Ken Fritz	10	277	Guard	Pittsburgh Steelers

== Game summaries ==
=== Syracuse ===
Team	1	2	3	4	Total
Syracuse	0	0	8	0	8
• Ohio St	7	14	3	7	31

- Date: September 8
- Location: Ohio Stadium
- Game start: 1:30 p.m.
- Elapsed time: 2:46
- Game attendance: 86,205
- Game weather: Partly cloudy; 67 °F (19 °C); wind 10–15 mph (16–24 km/h) N

Scoring summary
Q1	2:49	OHST	Barwig 11 yard pass from Schlichter (Janakievski kick)	OHST 7–0
Q2	13:32	OHST	Campbell 3 yard run (Janakievski kick)	OHST 14–0
Q2	7:18	OHST	Murray 2 yard run (Janakievski kick)	OHST 21–0
Q3	6:32	OHST	Janakievski 22 yard field goal	OHST 24–0
Q3	:23	SYR	Hurley 3 yard run (McCollum run)	OHST 24–8
Q4	7:51	OHST	Gayle 29 yard run (Janakievski kick)	OHST 31–8

=== Minnesota ===
Team	1	2	3	4	Total
• Ohio St	7	0	6	8	21
Minnesota	14	3	0	0	17

- Date: September 15
- Location: Memorial Stadium
- Game start: 1:30 p.m.
- Elapsed time: 2:36
- Game attendance: 43,926
- Game weather: Sunny; 68 °F (20 °C); wind 8 mph (13 km/h) SE
- Referee: Otho Kertz

Scoring summary
Q1	12:20	MINN	White 29 yard run (kick blocked)	MINN 6–0
Q1	5:45	MINN	White 16 yard pass from Carlson (Bourquin pass from Carlson)	MINN 14–0
Q1	2:48	OHST	Hicks 39 yard pass from Schlichter (Janakievski kick)	MINN 14–7
Q2	:07	MINN	Rogind 44 yard field goal	MINN 17–7
Q3	7:24	OHST	Murray 1 yard run (kick failed)	MINN 17–13
Q4	12:42	OHST	Schlichter 32 yard run (Jaco pass from Schlichter)	OHST 21–17

=== Washington State ===
Team	1	2	3	4	Total
Wash St	3	0	10	16	29
• Ohio St	7	17	7	14	45

- Date: September 22
- Location: Ohio Stadium
- Game start: 1:30 p.m.
- Elapsed time: 2:46
- Game attendance: 87,495
- Game weather: Overcast; 64 °F (18 °C); wind 10–20 mph (16–32 km/h) NE

Scoring summary
Q1	9:49	WSU	DeSanto 47 yard field goal	WSU 3–0
Q1	3:46	OHST	Schlichter 5 yard run (Janakievski kick)	OHST 7–3
Q2	5:18	OHST	Murray 13 yard run (Janakievski kick)	OHST 14–3
Q2	2:51	OHST	Janakievski 30 yard field goal	OHST 17–3
Q2	1:27	OHST	Hicks recovered blocked punt in end zone (Jankievski kick)	OHST 24–3
Q3	13:22	WSU	Whatley 12 yard pass from Grant (DeSanto kick)	OHST 24–10
Q3	2:27	WSU	DeSanto 41 yard field goal	OHST 24–13
Q3	:58	OHST	Murray 86 yard pass from Schlichter (Janakievski kick)	OHST 31–13
Q4	13:52	WSU	Wilson 11 yard pass from Grant (Beach pass from Grant)	OHST 31–21
Q4	11:25	OHST	Murray 8 yard run (Janakievski kick)	OHST 38–21
Q4	5:53	WSU	Wilson 11 yard pass from Grant (Grant run)	OHST 38–29
Q4	3:13	OHST	Donley 29 yard pass from Schlichter (Janakievski kick)	OHST 45–29

The longest pass in school history to date, an 86-yard bomb from Art Schlichter to Calvin Murray, helped propel Ohio State to a 45-29 win over Washington State. The previous record was an 80-yard pass from Joe Sparma to Bob Klein in 1961 versus Michigan.

=== UCLA ===
Team	1	2	3	4	Total
• Ohio St	0	7	3	7	17
UCLA	10	0	0	3	13

- Date: September 29
- Location: Los Angeles Memorial Coliseum
- Game start: 1:00 p.m.
- Elapsed time: 2:46
- Game attendance: 47,228
- Game weather: Cloudy; 71 °F (22 °C); light wind SW
- Referee: Bill Love

Scoring summary
Q1	8:27	UCLA	Curren 10 yard pass from Bashore (Boermeester kick)	UCLA 7–0
Q1	:52	UCLA	Boermeester 27 yard field goal	UCLA 10–0
Q2	4:53	OHST	Murray 34 yard run (Janakievski kick)	UCLA 10–7
Q3	5:46	OHST	Janakievski 24 yard field goal	Tie 10–10
Q4	11:00	UCLA	Boermeester 39 yard field goal	UCLA 13–10
Q4	:46	OHST	Campbell 2 yard pass from Schlichter (Janakievski kick)	OHST 17–13

=== Northwestern ===
Team	1	2	3	4	Total
Northwestern	0	0	0	7	7
• Ohio St	10	3	0	3	16

- Date: October 6
- Location: Ohio Stadium
- Game start: 1:30 p.m.
- Elapsed time: 2:41
- Game attendance: 87,406
- Game weather: Partly cloudy; 58 °F (14 °C); wind 10–20 mph (16–32 km/h) SW

Scoring summary
Q1	12:51	OHST	Janakievski 26 yard field goal	OHST 3–0
Q1	10:03	OHST	Dwelle 4 yard pass from Schlichter (Janakievski kick)	OHST 10–0
Q2	6:00	OHST	Janakievski 26 yard field goal	OHST 13–0
Q4	14:58	NW	Mishler 1 yard run (Poulos kick)	OHST 13–7
Q4	8:01	OHST	Atha 50 yard field goal	OHST 16–7

=== Indiana ===
Team	1	2	3	4	Total
Indiana	0	0	6	0	6
• Ohio St	9	17	14	7	47

- Date: October 13
- Location: Ohio Stadium
- Game start: 1:30 p.m.
- Elapsed time: 2:48
- Game attendance: 87,251
- Game weather: Cloudy; 44 °F (7 °C); wind 15 mph (24 km/h) NW

Scoring summary
Q1	11:38	OHST	Campbell 2 yard run (kick failed)	OHST 6–0
Q1	5:51	OHST	Janakievski 32 yard field goal	OHST 9–0
Q2	11:23	OHST	Janakievski 35 yard field goal	OHST 12–0
Q2	3:50	OHST	Campbell 3 yard run (Janakievski kick)	OHST 19–0
Q2	:28	OHST	Donley 21 yard pass from Schlichter (Janakievski kick)	OHST 26–0
Q3	11:22	OHST	Volley 2 yard run (Janakievski kick)	OHST 33–0
Q3	7:14	OHST	Schlichter 5 yard run (Janakievski kick)	OHST 40–0
Q3	:57	IND	Clifford 2 yard run (run failed)	OHST 40–6
Q4	3:58	OHST	Hicks 11 yard pass from Castignola (Janakievski kick)	OHST 47–6

=== Wisconsin ===
Team	1	2	3	4	Total
Wisconsin	0	0	0	0	0
• Ohio St	14	14	10	21	59

- Date: October 20
- Location: Ohio Stadium
- Game start: 1:30 p.m.
- Elapsed time: 2:48
- Game attendance: 87,585
- Game weather: Sunny; 77 °F (25 °C); wind 15–20 mph (24–32 km/h) S

Scoring summary
Q1	11:59	OHST	Schlichter 4 yard run (Janakievski kick)	OHST 7–0
Q1	2:15	OHST	Hunter 14 yard pass from Schlichter (Janakievski kick)	OHST 14–0
Q2	10:28	OHST	Williams 20 yard pass from Schlichter (Janakievski kick)	OHST 21–0
Q2	8:16	OHST	Schlichter 2 yard run (Janakievski kick)	OHST 28–0
Q3	7:35	OHST	Janakievski 19 yard field goal	OHST 31–0
Q3	6:39	OHST	Ellis 27 yard interception return (Janakievski kick)	OHST 38–0
Q4	10:51	OHST	Castignola 1 yard run (Janakievski kick)	OHST 45–0
Q4	2:23	OHST	Spencer 1 yard run (Janakievski kick)	OHST 52–0
Q4	:37	OHST	Lindsey 38 yard run (Janakievski kick)	OHST 59–0

=== Michigan State ===
Team	1	2	3	4	Total
Michigan St	0	0	0	0	0
• Ohio St	14	14	7	7	42

- Date: October 27
- Location: Ohio Stadium
- Game start: 1:30 p.m.
- Elapsed time: 2:35
- Game attendance: 87,747
- Game weather: Mostly sunny; 53 °F (12 °C); wind 10–15 mph (16–24 km/h) S

Scoring summary
Q1	11:49	OHST	Donley 53 yard pass from Schlichter (Janakievski kick)	OHST 7–0
Q1	2:48	OHST	Donley 12 yard pass from Schlichter (Janakievski kick)	OHST 14–0
Q2	13:30	OHST	Schlichter 3 yard run (Janakievski kick)	OHST 21–0
Q2	2:12	OHST	Volley 32 yard run (Janakievski kick)	OHST 28–0
Q3	4:58	OHST	Schlichter 6 yard run (Janakievski kick)	OHST 35–0
Q4	3:11	OHST	Castignola 1 yard run (Janakievski kick)	OHST 42–0

=== Illinois ===
Team	1	2	3	4	Total
• Ohio St	3	14	10	17	44
Illinois	0	0	7	0	7

- Date: November 3
- Location: Memorial Stadium
- Game attendance: 41,870
- Game weather: Clear; 51 °F (11 °C); wind 9 mph (14 km/h) NW

Scoring summary
Q1	8:36	OHST	Janakievski 47 yard field goal	OHST 3–0
Q2	14:18	OHST	Murray 4 yard run (Janakievski kick)	OHST 10–0
Q2	2:22	OHST	Bell 16 yard blocked punt return (Janakievski kick)	OHST 17–0
Q3	11:52	OHST	Campbell 3 yard run (Janakievski kick)	OHST 24–0
Q3	6:49	OHST	Janakievski 36 yard field goal	OHST 27–0
Q3	4:00	ILL	Boeke 10 yard pass from McCullough (Jones kick)	OHST 27–7
Q4	10:46	OHST	Schlichter 4 yard run (Janakievski kick)	OHST 34–7
Q4	8:42	OHST	Janakievski 51 yard field goal	OHST 37–7
Q4	2:13	OHST	Dwelle 4 yard pass from Castignola (Janakievski kick)	OHST 44–7

=== Iowa ===
Team	1	2	3	4	Total
Iowa	0	0	0	7	7
• Ohio St	13	14	0	7	34

- Date: November 10
- Location: Ohio Stadium
- Game start: 1:30 p.m.
- Elapsed time: 2:51
- Game attendance: 87,835
- Game weather: Cloudy; 41 °F (5 °C); wind 10–20 mph (16–32 km/h) NW

Scoring summary
Q1	5:55	OHST	Schlichter 1 yard run (Janakievski kick)	OHST 7–0
Q1	3:18	OHST	Janakievski 35 yard field goal	OHST 10–0
Q1	1:38	OHST	Janakievski 29 yard field goal	OHST 13–0
Q2	8:56	OHST	Volley 1 yard run (Jankievski kick)	OHST 20–0
Q2	6:40	OHST	Donley 33 yard pass from Schlichter (Janakievski kick)	OHST 27–0
Q4	12:16	OHST	Spencer 1 yard run (Janakievski kick)	OHST 34–0
Q4	4:07	IOWA	Chappelle 40 yard pass from Gales (Roby kick)	OHST 34–7

=== At Michigan ===
#2 Ohio State Buckeyes at #13 Michigan Wolverines

Quarter	1	2	3	4	Total
Ohio St	0	6	6	6	18
Michigan	0	7	8	0	15

at Michigan Stadium • Ann Arbor, Michigan

- Date: November 17
- Game weather: Sunny • 55 °F (13 °C) • Wind 10–15 mph (16–24 km/h) SW
- Game attendance: 106,255
- TV: ABC
- Ohio State Football - Archives

Game information

Ohio St

- Art Schlichter
  12/22, 196 Yds, TD, INT
- James Gayle
  9 Rush, 72 Yds
- Doug Donley
  3 Rec, 87 Yds

Michigan

- John Wangler
  4/9, 133 Yds, TD, INT
- Butch Woolfolk
  18 Rush, 68 Yds
- Anthony Carter
  2 Rec, 125 Yds, TD

Ohio State clinched the Big Ten title and a trip to the Rose Bowl with an 18-15 victory over their archrivals. The Buckeyes had not beaten nor scored a touchdown against Michigan since 1975, the last time they had gone to Pasadena.

Scoring summary

Quarter	Time	Drive			Team	Scoring information	Score	
Quarter	Time	Plays	Yards	TOP	Team	Scoring information	OSU	MICH
2	3:48				Ohio St	23-yard field goal by Janakievski	3	0
2	1:30				Michigan	Carter 59-yard touchdown reception from Wangler, Virgil kick good	3	7
2	0:08				Ohio St	25-yard field goal by Janakievski	6	7
3	7:19				Ohio St	Hunter 18-yard touchdown reception from Schlichter, 2-point pass failed/incomplete	12	7
3	3:58				Michigan	Smith 1-yard touchdown run, 2-point run good	12	15
4	11:21				Ohio St	Blocked punt returned 18 yards for touchdown by Bell, Janakievski kick failed	18	15
"TOP" = time of possession. For other American football terms, see Glossary of American football.							18	15

=== Rose Bowl ===
1980 Rose Bowl

Team	1	2	3	4	Total
• USC	3	7	0	7	17
Ohio St	0	10	3	3	16

- Date: January 1
- Location: Rose Bowl
- Game start: 2:00 p.m.
- Game attendance: 105,526
- TV announcers (NBC): Dick Enberg, Merlin Olsen, O.J. Simpson

Scoring summary
Q1	4:37	USC	Hipp 41 yard field goal	USC 3–0
Q2	9:11	USC	Williams 53 yard pass from McDonald (Hipp kick)	USC 10-0
Q2	3:10	OHST	Janakievski 35 yard field goal	USC 10–3
Q2	:21	OHST	Murray 67 yard pass from Schlichter (Janakievski kick)	Tie 10–10
Q3	10:53	OSU	Janakievski 37 yard field goal	OHST 13–10
Q4	9:42	OHST	Janakievski 24 yard field goal	OSU 16-10
Q4	1:32	USC	White 1 yard run (Hipp kick)	USC 17–16
