= 1979 Minnesota Golden Gophers football team =

American college football season

1979 Minnesota Golden Gophers football
- Conference: Big Ten Conference
- Record: 4–6–1 (3–5–1 Big Ten)
- Head coach: Joe Salem (1st season)
- Offensive coordinator: Mike Shanahan (1st season)
- MVP: Mark Carlson
- Captains: Alan Blanshan; Glenn Bourquin; Mark Carlson
- Home stadium: Memorial Stadium

1979 Big Ten Conference football standings
	Conf.					Overall
Team	W		L		T	W		L		T
No. 4 Ohio State $	8	–	0	–	0	11	–	1	–	0
No. 10 Purdue	7	–	1	–	0	10	–	2	–	0
No. 18 Michigan	6	–	2	–	0	8	–	4	–	0
No. 19 Indiana	5	–	3	–	0	8	–	4	–	0
Iowa	4	–	4	–	0	5	–	6	–	0
Minnesota	3	–	5	–	1	4	–	6	–	1
Michigan State	3	–	5	–	0	5	–	6	–	0
Wisconsin	3	–	5	–	0	4	–	7	–	0
Illinois	1	–	6	–	1	2	–	8	–	1
Northwestern	0	–	9	–	0	1	–	10	–	0
$ – Conference champion; Rankings from AP Poll

The 1979 Minnesota Golden Gophers football team represented the University of Minnesota in the 1979 Big Ten Conference football season. In their first year under head coach Joe Salem, the Golden Gophers compiled a 4–6–1 record and were outscored by their opponents by a combined total of 271 to 264.

Quarterback Mark Carlson received the team's Most Valuable Player award. Free safety Keith Edwards was awarded the Defensive MVP Award. Split End Elmer Bailey was named All-Big Ten first team. Defensive lineman Alan Blanshan and offensive lineman Bill Humphries were named Academic All-Big Ten.

Total attendance for the season was 241,942, which averaged to 40,323. The season high for attendance was against Purdue.

== Schedule ==
Date	Opponent	Site	Result	Attendance	Source
September 8	Ohio*	Memorial Stadium; Minneapolis, MN	W 24–10	33,435	
September 15	No. 15 Ohio State	Memorial Stadium; Minneapolis, MN	L 17–21	43,515	
September 22	at No. 1 USC*	Los Angeles Memorial Coliseum; Los Angeles, CA	L 14–48	61,966	
September 29	Northwestern	Memorial Stadium; Minneapolis, MN	W 38–8	33,998	
October 6	No. 12 Purdue	Memorial Stadium; Minneapolis, MN	W 31–14	47,281	
October 13	at No. 11 Michigan	Michigan Stadium; Ann Arbor, MI (Little Brown Jug)	L 21–31	104,677	
October 20	at Iowa	Kinnick Stadium; Iowa City, IA (rivalry)	W 24–7	60,050	
October 27	Illinois^{†}	Memorial Stadium; Minneapolis, MN	T 17–17	46,449	
November 3	at Indiana	Memorial Stadium; Bloomington, IN	L 24–42	35,591	
November 10	at Michigan State	Spartan Stadium; East Lansing, MI	L 17–31	75,433	
November 17	Wisconsin	Memorial Stadium; Minneapolis, MN (rivalry)	L 37–42	37,827	
*Non-conference game; ^{†}Homecoming; Rankings from AP Poll released prior to the game

== Roster ==
1979 Minnesota Golden Gophers football team roster
Players
Coaches
Offense

Pos.	#	Name	Class
G	62	Jim Anderson	So
FB	60	Jim Anderson	Jr
WR	86	Jeff Anhorn	Sr
WR	40	Roy Artis	Jr
QB	1	Wendell Avery	Sr
WR	20	Elmer Bailey	Sr
RB	41	Marion Barber Jr.	Jr
C	57	Chris Bennett	Fr
OT	79	Steve Bisch	Fr
TE	83	Glenn Bourquin	Sr
QB	12	Mark Carlson	Sr
OT	78	Ken Dallafior	So
G	67	Tom Fitzpatrick	Sr
G	65	Bill Humphries	Fr
WR	1	Kelvin Jenkins	Jr
OT	69	Kent Penovich	Jr
QB	10	Greg Pylatiuk	So
C	53	Randy Rasmussen	Fr
G	52	Darell Schwen	Sr
WR	15	Terry Simmons	Sr
G	79	Jeff Snodgrass	So
TE	81	Randy Sonnenfeld	Jr
OT	68	Marty Stein	Sr
FB	31	Bob Stroup	Fr
WR	27	Virgil Thomas	Fr
FB	48	Jeff Thompson	Sr
OT	75	Terry Thomton	Fr
C	53	Steve Tobin	Sr
QB	7	Mark Tonn	Sr
OT	73	Rene Ulloa	Fr
OT	63	Mark Vonderhaar	Fr

Defense

Pos.	#	Name	Class
DT	68	Rene Capo	Fr
SS	14	Glenn Cardelli	Fr
DE	70	Steve Cunningham	Sr
SS	22	Paul Dagner	Fr
DE	98	Anthony Davis	Fr
CB	25	Howard Davis	Fr
DT	91	Jeff Denney	Fr
LB	89	Jim Fahnhorst	So
SS	8	John Hoffman	Sr
LB	56	Jack Johnson	Sr
DT	94	Kevin Kellen	Fr
DT	92	John Kuduk	Sr
LB	35	Mark Laliberte	Fr
LB	59	Don Meyer	Sr
CB	23	Dana Noel	Jr
DE	96	Jeff Schuh	Jr
LB	39	DeWayne Williams	Fr
FS	16	Steve Wingert	Fr
SS	4	Rick Witthus	Fr
DE	59	John Wood	Fr

Special teams

Pos.	#	Name	Class
P	28	Tom Smith	Jr

Head coach

- Joe Salem

Coordinators/assistant coaches

- Tim Burke (assistant)
- Mike Shanahan (offensive coordinator)

Legend

- (C) Team captain
- (S) Suspended
- (I) Ineligible
- Injured
- Redshirt

Roster

== Team players in the NFL ==
Player	Position	Round	Pick	NFL club
Elmer Bailey	Wide receiver	4	100	Miami Dolphins
Greg Murtha	Tackle	6	161	Philadelphia Eagles
