= 1979 Purdue Boilermakers football team =

American college football season

1979 Purdue Boilermakers football

Astro-Bluebonnet Bowl champion

Astro-Bluebonnet Bowl, W 27–22 vs. Tennessee
- Conference: Big Ten Conference

Ranking
- Coaches: No. 10
- AP: No. 10
- Record: 10–2 (7–1 Big Ten)
- Head coach: Jim Young (3rd season)
- Offensive coordinator: Bob Bockrath (1st season)
- Defensive coordinator: Leon Burtnett (3rd season)
- MVP: Dave Young
- Captains: Steve McKenzie; Pete Quinn; Keena Turner
- Home stadium: Ross–Ade Stadium

1979 Big Ten Conference football standings
	Conf.					Overall
Team	W		L		T	W		L		T
No. 4 Ohio State $	8	–	0	–	0	11	–	1	–	0
No. 10 Purdue	7	–	1	–	0	10	–	2	–	0
No. 18 Michigan	6	–	2	–	0	8	–	4	–	0
No. 19 Indiana	5	–	3	–	0	8	–	4	–	0
Iowa	4	–	4	–	0	5	–	6	–	0
Minnesota	3	–	5	–	1	4	–	6	–	1
Michigan State	3	–	5	–	0	5	–	6	–	0
Wisconsin	3	–	5	–	0	4	–	7	–	0
Illinois	1	–	6	–	1	2	–	8	–	1
Northwestern	0	–	9	–	0	1	–	10	–	0
$ – Conference champion; Rankings from AP Poll

The 1979 Purdue Boilermakers football team represented Purdue University in the 1979 Big Ten Conference football season. Led by third-year head coach Jim Young, the Boilermakers compiled an overall record of 10–2 with a mark of 7–1 in conference play, placing second in the Big Ten. Purdue was invited to the Astro-Bluebonnet Bowl, where the Boilermakers defeated Tennessee. The team played home games at Ross–Ade Stadium in West Lafayette, Indiana.

This is Purdue's only 10-win season in program history as of 2026.

== Schedule ==
Date	Opponent	Rank	Site	TV	Result	Attendance	Source
September 8	Wisconsin	No. 6	Ross–Ade Stadium; West Lafayette, IN		W 41–20	65,002	
September 15	at UCLA*	No. 5	Los Angeles Memorial Coliseum; Los Angeles, CA		L 21–31	44,174	
September 22	No. 5 Notre Dame*	No. 17	Ross–Ade Stadium; West Lafayette, IN (rivalry)		W 28–22	70,567	
September 29	Oregon*	No. 10	Ross–Ade Stadium; West Lafayette, IN		W 13–7	69,327	
October 6	at Minnesota	No. 12	Memorial Stadium; Minneapolis, MN		L 14–31	47,686	
October 13	Illinois	No. 20	Ross–Ade Stadium; West Lafayette, IN (rivalry)		W 28–14	69,413	
October 20	at Michigan State	No. 16	Spartan Stadium; East Lansing, MI		W 14–7	79,561	
October 27	Northwestern^{†}	No. 16	Ross–Ade Stadium; West Lafayette, IN		W 20–16	69,656	
November 3	at Iowa	No. 15	Kinnick Stadium; Iowa City, IA		W 20–14	59,940	
November 10	No. 10 Michigan	No. 14	Ross–Ade Stadium; West Lafayette, IN		W 24–21	69,829	
November 17	at Indiana	No. 12	Memorial Stadium; Bloomington, IN (Old Oaken Bucket)		W 37–21	53,202	
December 31	vs. Tennessee	No. 12	Houston Astrodome; Houston, TX (Astro-Bluebonnet Bowl)	Mizlou	W 27–22	40,542	
*Non-conference game; ^{†}Homecoming; Rankings from AP Poll released prior to the game

== Game summaries ==
=== Oregon ===
- Wally Jones 30 rushes, 156 yards

=== Illinois ===
- Mark Herrmann breaks Mike Phipps' school record for career passing yardage
- Dave Young 114 Rec Yds, 2 TD
- Jimmy Smith 23 rushes, 125 yards

=== At Michigan State ===
Team	1	2	3	4	Total
• Purdue	7	0	7	0	14
Michigan St	0	0	0	7	7

- Date: Saturday, October 20
- Location: Spartan Stadium, East Lansing, Michigan

Scoring summary
1	Purdue	Wayne Smith]|Wayne Smith 42-yard interception return (Seibel kick)	Purdue 7-0
3	Purdue	Jimmy Smith 1-yard run (Seibel kick)	Purdue 14-0
4	Michigan St	Steve Smith 1-yard run (Andersen kick)	Purdue 14-7

Mark Herrmann broke the Big Ten career completion record set by Michigan State's Ed Smith in the previous year.

=== At Iowa ===
Purdue at Iowa

Team	1	2	3	4	Total
• Boilermakers	7	7	6	0	20
Hawkeyes	6	8	0	0	14

- Date: November 3
- Location: Kinnick Stadium, Iowa City, Iowa

Scoring summary
1	Purdue	D. Young 3-yard pass from Herrmann (Seibel kick)	Purdue 7-0
1	Iowa	Mosley 1-yard run (kick failed)	Purdue 7-6
2	Iowa	McKillip 16-yard run (Reid pass from Mosley)	Iowa 14-7
2	Purdue	McCall 17-yard pass from Herrmann (Seibel kick)	Tie 14-14
3	Purdue	McCall 6-yard run (kick failed)	Purdue 20-14

=== Michigan ===
#10 Michigan at #14 Purdue

Team	1	2	3	4	Total
Michigan	0	0	6	15	21
• Purdue	7	0	7	10	24

- Date: November 10
- Location: Ross–Ade Stadium, West Lafayette, IN
- Game attendance: 69,829

Scoring summary
1	PUR	Ben McCall 2-yard run (Seibel kick)	Purdue 7-0
3	PUR	Mark Herrmann 1-yard run (Seibel kick)	Purdue 14-0
3	MICH	Curt Marsh 6-yard pass from John Wangler (kick failed)	Purdue 14-6
4	PUR	Seibel 29-yard field goal	Purdue 17-6
4	PUR	Ben McCall 9-yard run	Purdue 24-6
4	MICH	Roosevelt Smith 1-yard run (run failed)	Purdue 24-12
4	MICH	Butch Woolfolk 2-yard run (Virgil kick)	Purdue 24-19
4	MICH	Safety, Mark Herrmann tackled in end zone	Purdue 24-21

=== At Indiana ===
- Ben McCall 20 rushes, 148 yards

=== Vs. Tennessee (Bluebonnet Bowl) ===
Team	1	2	3	4	Total
• Purdue	0	14	7	6	27
Tennessee	0	0	16	6	22

- Date: December 31
- Location: Astrodome, Houston, Texas
- Game attendance: 40,542

Scoring summary
2	Purdue	Ben McCall 6-yard run (John Seibel kick)	Purdue 7-0
2	Purdue	Bart Burrell 12-yard pass from Mark Herrmann (John Seibel kick)	Purdue 14-0
3	Purdue	Dave Young 12-yard pass from Mark Herrmann (John Seibel kick)	Purdue 21-0
3	Tennessee	Glenn Ford 8-yard pass from Jimmy Streater (pass failed)	Purdue 21-6
4	Tennessee	James Berry 15-yard pass from Phil Ingram (Hubert Simpson run)	Purdue 21-14
4	Tennessee	Hubert Simpson 1-yard run (Hubert Simpson pass from Jimmy Streater)	Tennessee 22-21
4	Purdue	Dave Young 17-yard pass from Mark Herrmann (pass failed)	Purdue 27-22

- PUR: Mark Herrmann 21/39, 303 Yds, 3 TD
- PUR: Bart Burell 8 Rec, 144 Yds, TD

== Personnel ==
=== Roster ===
1979 Purdue Boilermakers football team roster
Players
Coaches
Offense

Pos.	#	Name	Class
RB	23	Mike Augustyniak	Sr
TE		Tom Barr
WR		Bart Burrell
OL		Henry Fiel
WR		Mike Fuetterer
QB		Larry Gates
OL		Don Hall
WR		Mike Harris
QB	9	Mark Herrmann	Jr
RB		Wally Jones
RB		Eric Jordan
RB		John Macon
RB		Ben McCall
OL		Steve McKenzie
RB		Jim Owen
OL		Pete Quinn
OL		Dale Schwan
RB		Jimmy Smith
WR		Ray Smith
TE	80	Dave Young	Jr

Defense

Pos.	#	Name	Class
DL		Calvin Clark
DL		Marcus Jackson
DB		Bill Kay
DL		Tom Kingsbury
LB		Jim Looney
DL		Ken Loushin
LB		Mike Marks
DB		Marcus McKinnie
LB		Kevin Motts
DB		Larry Perry
DB		Tom Seneff
DB		Wayne Smith
DE	85	Keena Turner	Sr
DB		Bobby Williams

Special teams

Pos.	#	Name	Class
K		Walt Drapeza
P		Greg Hayes
PR		Tony Hill
P		Terry Kingseed
P		Joe Linville
PR		Dave Retherford
K		John Seibel
PR		Jeff Speedy

Head coach

- Jim Young

Coordinators/assistant coaches

- Bob Bockrath (offensive coordinator)
- Leon Burtnett (defensive coordinator)
- Mike Hankwitz
- Randy Hart
- Doug Redmann
- Bob Spoo
- Larry Thompson
- Ed Zaunbrecher

Legend

- (C) Team captain
- (S) Suspended
- (I) Ineligible
- Injured
- Redshirt

=== Starters ===
Offense: se Burrell/Ray Smith, lt Feil, lg Schwan, c Quinn, rg Hall, rt McKenzie, te Young, qb Herrmann, fb Augustyniak, tb Jones/McCall, fl Harris, k Seibel

Defense: de Kingsbury, lt Clark, mg Loushin, rt Jackson, de Turner, lb Motts/Looney/Marks, cb W. smith/Kay, ss Seneff, fs Williams/McKinnie, p Hayes

== Awards ==
=== All-Big Ten ===
- Calvin Clark (1st)
- Ken Loushin (1st)
- Steve McKenzie (1st)
- Dale Schwan (1st)
- Keena Turner (1st)
- Dave Young (1st)
- Mark Herrmann (2nd)
- Marcus Jackson (2nd)
- Kevin Motts (2nd)
- Pete Quinn (2nd)
- Wayne Smith (2nd)

== Statistics ==
=== Passing ===
Player	Comp	Att	Yards	TD	INT
Mark Herrmann	203	348	2,377	16	19
