= 1979 Iowa Hawkeyes football team =

American college football season

1979 Iowa Hawkeyes football
- Conference: Big Ten Conference
- Record: 5–6 (4–4 Big Ten)
- Head coach: Hayden Fry (1st season)
- Offensive coordinator: Bill Snyder (1st season)
- Offensive scheme: Pro-style
- Defensive coordinator: Bill Brashier (1st season)
- Base defense: 5–2
- MVP: Dennis Mosley
- Captains: Jim Molini; Mario Pace; Sam Palladino; Cedric Shaw; Jim Swift
- Home stadium: Kinnick Stadium

1979 Big Ten Conference football standings
	Conf.					Overall
Team	W		L		T	W		L		T
No. 4 Ohio State $	8	–	0	–	0	11	–	1	–	0
No. 10 Purdue	7	–	1	–	0	10	–	2	–	0
No. 18 Michigan	6	–	2	–	0	8	–	4	–	0
No. 19 Indiana	5	–	3	–	0	8	–	4	–	0
Iowa	4	–	4	–	0	5	–	6	–	0
Minnesota	3	–	5	–	1	4	–	6	–	1
Michigan State	3	–	5	–	0	5	–	6	–	0
Wisconsin	3	–	5	–	0	4	–	7	–	0
Illinois	1	–	6	–	1	2	–	8	–	1
Northwestern	0	–	9	–	0	1	–	10	–	0
$ – Conference champion; Rankings from AP Poll

The 1979 Iowa Hawkeyes football team was an American football team that represented the University of Iowa as a member of the Big Ten Conference during the 1979 Big Ten football season. In their first year under head coach Hayden Fry, the Hawkeyes compiled a 5–6 record (4–4 in conference games), finished in fifth place in the Big Ten, and outscored opponents by a total of 239 to 216. Fry was hired as the head coach in December 1978 after spending the previous six years at North Texas State. Fry in 1979 hired Bill Snyder as his offensive coordinator and Barry Alvarez as his linebackers coach and recruited 18-year-old Bob Stoops to play defensive back at Iowa; all four are now in the College Football Hall of Fame and rank among the greatest coaches in modern college football history.

Tailback Dennis Mosley won the Big Ten rushing title and set Iowa single-season records with 1,267 rushing yards, 16 touchdowns, and 96 points scored. He was selected as the team's most valuable player and received second-team All-America honors. Mosley, linebacker Leven Weiss and center Jay Hilgenberg also received first-team All-Big Ten honors. The team had a strong recruiting class that included linebacker Andre Tippett, defensive tackle Mark Bortz, punter Reggie Roby, and Bob Stoops.

The team played its home games at Kinnick Stadium in Iowa City, Iowa.

== Schedule ==
Date	Opponent	Site	Result	Attendance	Source
September 8	Indiana	Kinnick Stadium; Iowa City, IA	L 26–30	59,700	
September 15	at No. 3 Oklahoma*	Memorial Stadium; Norman, OK	L 6–21	72,531	
September 22	No. 7 Nebraska*	Kinnick Stadium; Iowa City, IA	L 21–24	60,055	
September 29	Iowa State*	Kinnick Stadium; Iowa City, IA (rivalry)	W 30–14	60,100	
October 6	at Illinois	Memorial Stadium; Champaign, IL	W 13–7	51,044	
October 13	at Northwestern	Dyche Stadium; Evanston, IL	W 58–6	27,224	
October 20	Minnesota	Kinnick Stadium; Iowa City, IA (Floyd of Rosedale)	L 7–24	60,050	
October 27	at Wisconsin	Camp Randall Stadium; Madison, WI	W 24–13	79,026	
November 3	Purdue	Kinnick Stadium; Iowa City, IA	L 14–20	59,940	
November 10	at No. 3 Ohio State	Ohio Stadium; Columbus, OH	L 7–34	87,835	
November 17	Michigan State	Kinnick Stadium; Iowa City, IA	W 33–23	58,320	
*Non-conference game; Rankings from AP Poll released prior to the game

== Game summaries ==
=== Indiana ===
Indiana at Iowa

Team	1	2	3	4	Total
• Hoosiers	0	3	7	20	30
Hawkeyes	13	13	0	0	26

- Date: September 8
- Location: Kinnick Stadium
- Game attendance: 59,780
- Sources: Box Score and Game Story

Scoring summary
Q1		IOWA	Mosley 23-yard run (kick failed)	IOWA 6–0
Q1		IOWA	Mosley 5-yard run (Schilling kick)	IOWA 13–0
Q2		Indiana	Straub 29-yard field goal	IOWA 13–3
Q2		IOWA	Mosley 5-yard pass from Suess (Schilling kick)	IOWA 20–3
Q2	3:06	IOWA	Mosley 1-yard run (pass failed)	IOWA 26–3
Q3		Indiana	Johnson 51-yard pass from Clifford (Straub kick)	IOWA 26–10
Q4		Indiana	Johnson 1-yard run (pass failed)	IOWA 26–16
Q4		Indiana	Clifford 1-yard run (Straub kick)	IOWA 26–23
Q4	0:58	Indiana	Johnson 66-yard pass from Clifford (Straub kick)	Indiana 30–26

On October 22, 2016, former Indiana University coach and current ESPN College Football analyst Lee Corso described the game on College Gameday. He said at halftime he told the Hoosiers (who were losing the game 26-3) to not bother coming out for the 2nd half unless they were prepared to win the game. Indiana would then go on to win the game, 30-26, spoiling the debut of head coach Hayden Fry.

Game statistics	INDIANA	IOWA
First downs	25	22
Total yards	479	389
Passing yards	316	227
Rushing yards	143	162
Penalties	6–53	8–87
Turnovers	3	3

=== At No. 3 Oklahoma ===
Iowa at #3 Oklahoma

Team	1	2	3	4	Total
Hawkeyes	6	0	0	0	6
• No. 3 Sooners	0	7	0	14	21

- Date: September 15
- Location: Oklahoma Memorial Stadium, Norman, Oklahoma
- Game attendance: 71,187
- Source: Box Score and Game Story

Scoring summary
1	3:30	IOWA	Dennis Mosley 10-yard pass from Phil Seuss (kick failed)	IOWA 6-0
2	4:00	OU	Billy Sims 1-yard run (John Hoge kick)	OU 7-6
4	13:08	OU	Billy Sims 3-yard run (John Hoge kick)	OU 14-6
4	3:36	OU	J.C. Watts 1-yard run (John Hoge kick)	OU 21-6

Game statistics	OKLAHOMA	IOWA
First downs	23	12
Total yards	452	202
Passing yards	183	139
Rushing yards	269	63
Penalties	4–40	5–36
Turnovers	5	2

=== No. 7 Nebraska ===
#7 Nebraska at Iowa

Team	1	2	3	4	Total
• No. 7 Cornhuskers	0	7	7	10	24
Hawkeyes	7	0	14	0	21

- Date: September 22
- Location: Kinnick Stadium, Iowa City, Iowa
- Game start: 1:05 p.m. CDT
- Elapsed time: 2:35
- Game attendance: 60,055
- Referee: Richard McVay
- Sources: Box Score and Game Story

Scoring summary
1	11:51	IOWA	McKillip 2-yard run (Reggie Roby kick)	IOWA 7-0
2	2:12	NEB	Quinn 1-yard run (Sukup kick)	Tied 7-7
3	6:53	IOWA	McKillip 2-yard run (Roby kick)	IOWA 14-7
3	5:21	IOWA	Chappelle 29-yard pass from Gales (Roby kick)	IOWA 21-7
3	2:02	NEB	Hager 4-yard run (Sukup kick)	IOWA 21-14
4	11:02	NEB	Johnson 5-yard run (Sukup kick)	Tied 21-21
4	5:52	NEB	Sukup 30-yard field goal	NEB 24-21

For the second week in a row, the Hawkeyes faced a Big 8 opponent ranked in the top 10. Iowa led, 21-14, at the end of the third quarter, but Nebraska tied the game then recovered a fumble before kicking the winning field goal late.

=== Iowa State ===
Battle for the Cy-Hawk Trophy

Team	1	2	3	4	Total
Cyclones	7	0	7	0	14
• Hawkeyes	7	7	7	9	30

- Date: September 29
- Location: Kinnick Stadium, Iowa City, Iowa
- Game start: 1:05 p.m. CDT
- Elapsed time: 2:55
- Game attendance: 60,100
- Referee: Gene Calhoun
- Sources: Box Score and Game Story

Scoring summary
1	9:38	IOWA	Mosley 1-yard run (Reggie Roby kick)	IOWA 7-0
1	0:07	ISU	Mack 1-yard run (Giffords kick)	Tied 7-7
2	4:38	IOWA	Mosley 9-yard pass from Gales (Roby kick)	IOWA 14-7
3	11:12	IOWA	Mosley 18-yard run (Roby kick)	IOWA 21-7
3	8:48	ISU	Less 26-yard interception return (Giffords kick)	IOWA 21-14
4	6:46	IOWA	McKillip 27-yard run (kick failed)	IOWA 27-14
4	4:33	IOWA	Roby 44-yard field goal	IOWA 30-14

This game marked Hayden Fry's first win as head coach of the Hawkeyes.

Game statistics	ISU	IOWA
First downs	14	30
Total yards	162	429
Passing yards	56	51
Rushing yards	106	378
Penalties	4–35	7–63
Turnovers	3	3

=== At Illinois ===
Iowa at Illinois

Team	1	2	3	4	Total
• Hawkeyes	0	6	7	0	13
Fighting Illini	0	7	0	0	7

- Date: October 6
- Location: Memorial Stadium
- Game attendance: 51,044

Scoring summary
Q2	IOWA	Roby 25 yard field goal	IOWA 3–0
Q2	IOWA	Roby 33 yard field goal	IOWA 6–0
Q2	ILL	Strader 4 yard pass from McCullough (Bostrom kick)	ILL 7–6
Q3	IOWA	McKillip 1 yard run (Roby kick)	IOWA 13–7

=== At Northwestern ===
Iowa at Northwestern

Team	1	2	3	4	Total
• Hawkeyes	7	28	0	23	58
Wildcats	0	0	0	6	6

- Date: October 13
- Location: Dyche Stadium
- Game attendance: 27,224
- Sources: Box Score and Game Story

Scoring summary
Q1	IOWA	Mosley 1-yard run (Roby kick)	IOWA 7–0
Q2	IOWA	Bohannon 5-yard run (Roby kick)	IOWA 14–0
Q2	IOWA	Chappelle 44-yard pass from Bohannon (Roby kick)	IOWA 21–0
Q2	IOWA	Burke 12-yard pass from Bohannon (Roby kick)	IOWA 28–0
Q2	IOWA	Bohannon 6-yard run (Roby kick)	IOWA 35–0
Q4	IOWA	McKillip 7-yard pass from Suess (Roby kick)	IOWA 42–0
Q4	IOWA	Mosley 1-yard run (Roby kick)	IOWA 49–0
Q4	NW	Bogan 69-yard pass from Kerrigan (pass failed)	IOWA 49–6
Q4	IOWA	Roby 27-yard field goal	IOWA 52–6
Q4	IOWA	Dunham 2-yard pass from Gales (kick failed)	IOWA 58–6

- Gordy Bohannan, a junior college transfer, made his first career start

Game statistics	IOWA	NW
First downs	25	16
Total yards	509	320
Passing yards	145	202
Rushing yards	364	118
Penalties	3–35	4–52
Turnovers	0	8

=== Minnesota ===
Minnesota at Iowa

Team	1	2	3	4	Total
• Golden Gophers	10	0	14	0	24
Hawkeyes	0	7	0	0	7

- Date: October 20
- Location: Kinnick Stadium
- Game attendance: 60,050
- Sources: Box Score and Game Story

=== At Wisconsin ===
Team	1	2	3	4	Total
• Hawkeyes	0	14	0	10	24
Badgers	0	10	0	3	13

- Date: October 27
- Location: Camp Randall Stadium
- Game attendance: 79,026
- Sources: Box Score and Game Story

Scoring summary
Q2	12:13	WIS	Veith 27-yard field goal	WIS 3–0
Q2		WIS	Mohapp 15-yard run (Veith kick)	WIS 10–0
Q2		IOWA	Swift 6-yard pass from Suess (Roby kick)	WIS 10–7
Q2		IOWA	Brady 27-yard pass from Suess (Roby kick)	IOWA 14–10
Q4	14:14	IOWA	Roby 22-yard field goal	IOWA 17–10
Q4		WIS	Veith 37-yard field goal	IOWA 17–13
Q4		IOWA	Mosley 75-yard pass from Suess (Roby kick)	IOWA 24–13

Dennis Mosley broke Ed Podolak's Iowa single-season rushing record and caught a 75-yard touchdown pass in the win over the Badgers.

=== Purdue ===
Purdue at Iowa

Team	1	2	3	4	Total
• Boilermakers	7	7	6	0	20
Hawkeyes	6	8	0	0	14

- Date: November 3
- Location: Kinnick Stadium, Iowa City, Iowa
- Game attendance: 59,940

Scoring summary
1	Purdue	D. Young 3-yard pass from Herrmann (Seibel kick)	Purdue 7-0
1	Iowa	Mosley 1-yard run (kick failed)	Purdue 7-6
2	Iowa	McKillip 16-yard run (Reid pass from Mosley)	Iowa 14-7
2	Purdue	McCall 17-yard pass from Herrmann (Seibel kick)	Tie 14-14
3	Purdue	McCall 6-yard run (kick failed)	Purdue 20-14

=== At No. 3 Ohio State ===
Iowa at Ohio State

Team	1	2	3	4	Total
Hawkeyes	0	0	0	7	7
• No. 3 Buckeyes	13	14	0	7	34

- Date: November 10
- Location: Ohio Stadium
- Game start: 1:30 p.m. EST
- Elapsed time: 2:51
- Game attendance: 87,835
- Game weather: Cloudy; 41 °F (5 °C); wind 10–20 mph (16–32 km/h) NW

Scoring summary
1	5:55	OHST	Schlichter 1-yard run (Janakievski kick)	OHST 7–0
1	3:18	OHST	Janakievski 35-yard field goal	OHST 10–0
1	1:38	OHST	Janakievski 29-yard field goal	OHST 13–0
2	8:56	OHST	Volley 1-yard run (Jankievski kick)	OHST 20–0
2	6:40	OHST	Donley 33-yard pass from Schlichter (Janakievski kick)	OHST 27–0
4	12:16	OHST	Spencer 1-yard run (Janakievski kick)	OHST 34–0
4	4:07	IOWA	Chappelle 40-yard pass from Gales (Roby kick)	OHST 34–7

=== Michigan State ===
Michigan State at Iowa

Team	1	2	3	4	Total
Spartans	6	10	0	7	23
• Hawkeyes	7	6	14	6	33

- Date: November 17
- Location: Kinnick Stadium
- Game attendance: 58,320
- Sources: Box Score and Game Story

Scoring summary
Q1	IOWA	Mosley 1-yard run (Roby kick)	IOWA 7–0
Q1	MSU	Morten Andersen 54-yard field goal	IOWA 7–3
Q1	MSU	Andersen 25-yard field goal	IOWA 7–6
Q2	IOWA	Mosley 1-yard run (run failed)	IOWA 13–6
Q2	MSU	Clark 1-yard run (Andersen kick)	Tied 13–13
Q2	MSU	Andersen 45-yard field goal	MSU 16–13
Q3	IOWA	Suess 7-yard run (Roby kick)	IOWA 20–16
Q3	IOWA	McKillip 18-yard run (Roby kick)	IOWA 27–16
Q4	IOWA	Mosley 5-yard run (pass failed)	IOWA 33–16
Q4	MSU	Hughes 1-yard run (Andersen kick)	IOWA 33–23

Game statistics	MSU	IOWA
First downs	17	23
Total yards	395	444
Passing yards	244	204
Rushing yards	151	238
Penalties	3–28	1–20
Turnovers	2	3

== Roster ==
1979 Iowa Hawkeyes football team roster
Players
Coaches
Offense

Pos.	#	Name	Class
RB	28	Phil Blatcher	So
QB	11	Gordy Bohannan	Jr
WR	88	Mike Brady	Sr
WR	19	Keith Chappelle	Jr
QB	12	Pete Gales	So
G	76	Ron Hallstrom	So
C	54	Jay Hilgenberg	Jr
FB	35	Dean McKillip
RB		Rod Morton	Sr
RB	18	Dennis Mosley	Sr
WR	83	Lon Olejniczak	Fr
WR	87	Brad Reid	Sr
QB	16	Phil Suess	Jr
TE		Jim Swift	Sr

Defense

Pos.	#	Name	Class
DL	63	Mark Bortz	Fr
		Kent Ellis
DB	10	Jim Frazier	So
DB	43	Lou King	So
CB		Mario Pace
DB	20	Cedric Shaw
DB	41	Bob Stoops	Fr
DE	99	Andre Tippett	So
LB	42	Leven Weiss

Special teams

Pos.	#	Name	Class
P		Dave Holsclaw
P/K	7	Reggie Roby	Fr
K		Scott Schilling

Head coach

- Hayden Fry

Coordinators/assistant coaches

- Bill Snyder – Offensive Coordinator/Quarterbacks
- Bill Brashier – Defensive Coordinator
- Carl Jackson – Running backs
- Del Miller – Offensive assistant
- Dan McCarney – Defensive line
- Barry Alvarez – Linebackers
- Don Patterson – Defensive Backs
- Bernie Wyatt – Defensive Ends/Recruiting Coordinator

Legend

- (C) Team captain
- (S) Suspended
- (I) Ineligible
- Injured
- Redshirt

== Statistical achievements ==
The 1975 Hawkeyes gained 2,130 rushing yards and 1,669 passing yards. On defense, they gave up 1,881 rushing yards and 1,843 passing yards.

Tailback Dennis Mosley won the Big Ten rushing title, became Iowa's first 1,000-yard rusher, and set Iowa single-season records with 1,267 rushing yards (including 239 yards against Iowa State), 16 touchdowns, and 96 points scored. He was selected as the team's most valuable player, was selected as a second-team All-American by the UPI, and received first-team honors on the 1979 All-Big Ten Conference football team.

The team's other statistical leaders included quarterback Phil Suess (88-of-159 passing for 1,165 yards), Brad Reid (25 receptions, 290 yards), and linebacker Leven Weiss (112 total tackles).

Home attendance totaled 358,245, an average of 59,708 per game.

== Awards and honors ==
Tailback Dennis Mosley received second-team honors from the UPI and third-team honors form the AP on the 1979 All-America college football team.

Mosley was also selected as the most valuable player of the 1979 team.

The following players received recognition on the 1979 All-Big Ten Conference football team: Dennis Mosley at running back (AP-1, UPI-1); Jay Hilgenberg at center (AP-1); Leven Weiss at linebacker (AP-1, UPI-2); and Reggie Roby at punter (UPI-2).

The following five players were co-captains of the 1979 team: defensive end Jim Molini, defensive back Mario Pace, offensive tackle Sam Palladino, defensive back Cedric Shaw, and tight end Jim Swift.

Two players (Bob Stoops and Andre Tippett) and three coaches (Hayden Fry, Bill Snyder, and Barry Alvarez) from the 1978 team have been inducted into the College Football Hall of Fame.

Three players (Andre Tippett, Mark Bortz, and Reggie Roby) were included on the all-time Iowa team selected by fans in 1989.

== 1980 NFL draft ==
Player	Position	Round	Pick	NFL club
Dennis Mosley	RB	9	232	Minnesota Vikings
Jim Swift	OT	9	238	Seattle Seahawks
