= 1979 Wisconsin Badgers football team =

American college football season

1979 Wisconsin Badgers football
- Conference: Big Ten Conference
- Record: 4–7 (3–5 Big Ten)
- Head coach: Dave McClain (2nd season)
- Offensive scheme: Triple option
- Defensive coordinator: Jim Hilles (2nd season)
- Base defense: 3–4
- MVP: Tom Stauss
- Captains: Dennis Christenson; Ray Snell; Tom Stauss
- Home stadium: Camp Randall Stadium

1979 Big Ten Conference football standings
	Conf.					Overall
Team	W		L		T	W		L		T
No. 4 Ohio State $	8	–	0	–	0	11	–	1	–	0
No. 10 Purdue	7	–	1	–	0	10	–	2	–	0
No. 18 Michigan	6	–	2	–	0	8	–	4	–	0
No. 19 Indiana	5	–	3	–	0	8	–	4	–	0
Iowa	4	–	4	–	0	5	–	6	–	0
Minnesota	3	–	5	–	1	4	–	6	–	1
Michigan State	3	–	5	–	0	5	–	6	–	0
Wisconsin	3	–	5	–	0	4	–	7	–	0
Illinois	1	–	6	–	1	2	–	8	–	1
Northwestern	0	–	9	–	0	1	–	10	–	0
$ – Conference champion; Rankings from AP Poll

The 1979 Wisconsin Badgers football team represented the University of Wisconsin–Madison in the 1979 Big Ten Conference football season. Led by second-year head coach Dave McClain, the Badgers compiled an overall record of 4–7 with a mark of 3–5 in conference play, tying for seventh place in the Big Ten. Wisconsin played home games at Camp Randall Stadium in Madison, Wisconsin.

== Schedule ==
Date	Opponent	Site	Result	Attendance	Source
September 8	at No. 6 Purdue	Ross–Ade Stadium; West Lafayette, IN	L 20–41	65,002	
September 15	Air Force*	Camp Randall Stadium; Madison, WI	W 38–0	66,466	
September 22	No. 20 UCLA*	Camp Randall Stadium; Madison, WI	L 12–37	78,830	
September 29	at San Diego State*	San Diego Stadium; San Diego, CA	L 17–24	38,633	
October 6	Indiana	Camp Randall Stadium; Madison, WI	L 0–3	74,188	
October 13	No. 19 Michigan State	Camp Randall Stadium; Madison, WI	W 38–29	77,083	
October 20	at No. 6 Ohio State	Ohio Stadium; Columbus, OH	L 0–59	87,585	
October 27	Iowa^{†}	Camp Randall Stadium; Madison, WI (rivalry)	L 13–24	79,026	
November 3	at No. 10 Michigan	Michigan Stadium; Ann Arbor, MI	L 0–54	104,952	
November 10	Northwestern	Camp Randall Stadium; Madison, WI	W 28–3	68,229	
November 17	at Minnesota	Memorial Stadium; Minneapolis, MN (rivalry)	W 42–37	37,827	
*Non-conference game; ^{†}Homecoming; Rankings from AP Poll released prior to the game

== Roster ==
1979 Wisconsin Badgers football team roster
Players
Coaches
Offense

Pos.	#	Name	Class
WR	19	Tom Braker	Sr
RB	23	Chucky Davis	Fr
OT	70	Jerry Doerger	So
FB	36	Gerald Green	Fr
QB	13	John Josten (injured)	So
G	71	Leo Joyce	Jr
QB	18	Mike Kalasmiki	Sr
RB	35	Tory King	Fr
TE	88	Keith Krepfle	Jr
OL	94	Jeff Luko	So
G	63	Jim Martine	Sr
RB	28	Dave Mohapp	So
QB	16	Kevin Motl	Jr
G	75	Steve Namnick	So
WR	22	Marvin Neal	Fr
OT	68	Mark Orszula	Jr
QB	10	Steve Parish	Jr
C	59	Joe Rothbauer	Jr
TE	87	Joe Ruetz	Jr
DT	76	Mark Shumate	So
OT	75	Ray Snell (C)	Sr
FB	26	Tom Stauss (C)	Sr
WR	42	Tim Stracka	So
TE	87	Ray Sydnor	Jr
TE	58	Ron Versnik	So
RB	1	John Williams	Fr
G	79	Bob Winckler	Fr

Defense

Pos.	#	Name	Class
LB	41	Dave Ahrens	Jr
CB	29	Ross Anderson	Jr
DE	85	Curt Blaskowski	Jr
LB	95	Guy Boliaux	So
DT	77	Tom Booker	Fr
LB	32	Kyle Borland	Fr
LB	65	Richard Burney	So
CB	30	Mickey Casey	Sr
LB	48	Dennis Christenson (C)	Sr
S, P	31	David Greenwood	Fr
S	22	Ben Hable	Jr
DT	72	Mike Herrington	Fr
DT	90	Thomas Houston (injured)	Jr
DT	91	Joel Krein	Sr
NT	50	Tim Krumrie	Fr
LB	47	Dave Levenick (injured)	Jr
LB	43	Don Lorenz	Sr
CB	45	Von Mansfield	So
S	11	Dan Messenger	So
LB	44	Jody O'Donnell	Fr
DT	76	Mark Shumate	So
CB	9	Clint Sims	Fr
LB	49	Larry Spurlin	So
S	5	Terry Stroede	Sr
S	27	Vaughn Thomas	So
S	12	George Welch	Sr
NT	61	Dan Yourg	Jr

Special teams

Pos.	#	Name	Class
S, P	31	David Greenwood	Fr
K	3	Pat Hady	Fr
K	5	Jon Kleinschmidt	Fr
K	7	Steve Veith	Sr

Head coach

- Dave McClain

Coordinators/assistant coaches

- Jim Hilles – Defensive Coordinator/Linebackers
- Bill Dudley – Quarterbacks and Receivers
- Doug Graber – Defensive Backs
- Arnold Jeter – Defensive Line
- Cliff Knox – Running Backs
- Mike Nelson – Defensive Ends
- Bob Palcic – Tackles and Tight Ends
- Mario Russo – Centers and Guards
- Terry Murawski – Administrative Assistant

Legend

- (C) Team captain
- (S) Suspended
- (I) Ineligible
- Injured
- Redshirt

== 1980 NFL draft ==
Player	Position	Round	Pick	NFL club
Ray Snell	Guard	1	22	Tampa Bay Buccaneers
Ray Sydnor	Tight end	3	83	Pittsburgh Steelers
Tom Schremp	Defensive end	6	152	New York Jets
