= 1979 Michigan State Spartans football team =

American college football season

1979 Michigan State Spartans football
- Conference: Big Ten Conference
- Record: 5–6 (3–5 Big Ten)
- Head coach: Darryl Rogers (4th season)
- Defensive coordinator: George Dyer (2nd season)
- MVP: Danny Bass
- Captains: Danny Bass; Mark Brammer
- Home stadium: Spartan Stadium

1979 Big Ten Conference football standings
	Conf.					Overall
Team	W		L		T	W		L		T
No. 4 Ohio State $	8	–	0	–	0	11	–	1	–	0
No. 10 Purdue	7	–	1	–	0	10	–	2	–	0
No. 18 Michigan	6	–	2	–	0	8	–	4	–	0
No. 19 Indiana	5	–	3	–	0	8	–	4	–	0
Iowa	4	–	4	–	0	5	–	6	–	0
Minnesota	3	–	5	–	1	4	–	6	–	1
Michigan State	3	–	5	–	0	5	–	6	–	0
Wisconsin	3	–	5	–	0	4	–	7	–	0
Illinois	1	–	6	–	1	2	–	8	–	1
Northwestern	0	–	9	–	0	1	–	10	–	0
$ – Conference champion; Rankings from AP Poll

The 1979 Michigan State Spartans football team was an American football team that represented Michigan State University as a member of the Big Ten Conference during the 1979 Big Ten football season. In their fourth and final season under head coach Darryl Rogers, the Spartans compiled a 5–6 record (3–5 in conference games), tied for seventh place in the Big Ten, and were outscored by a total of 253 to 240. In four games against ranked opponents, they lost to No. 15 Notre Dame, No. 11 Michigan, No. 16 Purdue, and No. 4 Ohio State.

On offense, the Spartans gained an average of 176.4 rushing yards and 141.0 passing yards per game. On defense, they gave up 190.8 rushing yards and 161.3 passing yards per game. The individual statistical leaders included quarterback Bryan Clark with 800 passing yards, Steve Smith with 972 rushing yards, Eugene Byrd with 30 receptionsand 559 receiving yards, and Derek Hughes (66 points scored on 11 touchdowns).

Three Spartans were selected by either the Associated Press (AP) or the United Press International (UPI) as first-team players on the 1979 All-Big Ten Conference football teams: tight end Mark Brammer (UPI-1); linebacker Danny Bass (AP-1); and punter Ray Stachowitz (AP-1). Dan Bass was selected as the team's most valuable player.

In January 1980, Rogers resigned to become head coach at Arizona State.

The team played its home games at Spartan Stadium in East Lansing, Michigan.

== Schedule ==
Date	Opponent	Rank	Site	Result	Attendance	Source
September 8	Illinois	No. 10	Spartan Stadium; East Lansing, MI	W 33–16	71,125	
September 15	Oregon*	No. 10	Spartan Stadium; East Lansing, MI	W 41–17	76,123	
September 22	Miami (OH)*	No. 8	Spartan Stadium; East Lansing, MI	W 24–21	78,582	
September 29	at No. 15 Notre Dame*	No. 7	Notre Dame Stadium; Notre Dame, IN (rivalry)	L 3–27	59,075	
October 6	No. 11 Michigan	No. 16	Spartan Stadium; East Lansing, MI (rivalry)	L 7–21	79,311	
October 13	at Wisconsin	No. 19	Camp Randall Stadium; Madison, WI	L 29–38	77,083	
October 20	No. 16 Purdue^{†}		Spartan Stadium; East Lansing, MI	L 7–14	79,561	
October 27	at No. 4 Ohio State		Ohio Stadium; Columbus, OH	L 0–42	87,747	
November 3	at Northwestern		Dyche Stadium; Evanston, IL	W 42–7	20,193	
November 10	Minnesota		Spartan Stadium; East Lansing, MI	W 31–17	75,433	
November 17	at Iowa		Kinnick Stadium; Iowa City, IA	L 23–33	56,320	
*Non-conference game; ^{†}Homecoming; Rankings from AP Poll released prior to the game

== Roster ==
1979 Michigan State Spartans football team roster
Players
Coaches
Offense

Pos.	#	Name	Class
TE	91	Mark Brammer	Sr
OT	53	Angelo Fields	Sr
WR	6	Mark Jones
FB	33	Joe Kolodziej

Defense

Pos.	#	Name	Class
DB	16	Mark Anderson	Sr
LB	49	Danny Bass	Sr
CB	28	Jim Burroughs	So
LB	40	John McCormick	Jr
LB	57	Larry Savage	Sr

Special teams

Pos.	#	Name	Class
K	8	Morten Andersen	So
P	19	Ray Stachowicz	Jr

Head coach

- Darryl Rogers

Coordinators/assistant coaches

Legend

- (C) Team captain
- (S) Suspended
- (I) Ineligible
- Injured
- Redshirt
