= 1979 Indiana Hoosiers football team =

American college football season

1979 Indiana Hoosiers football
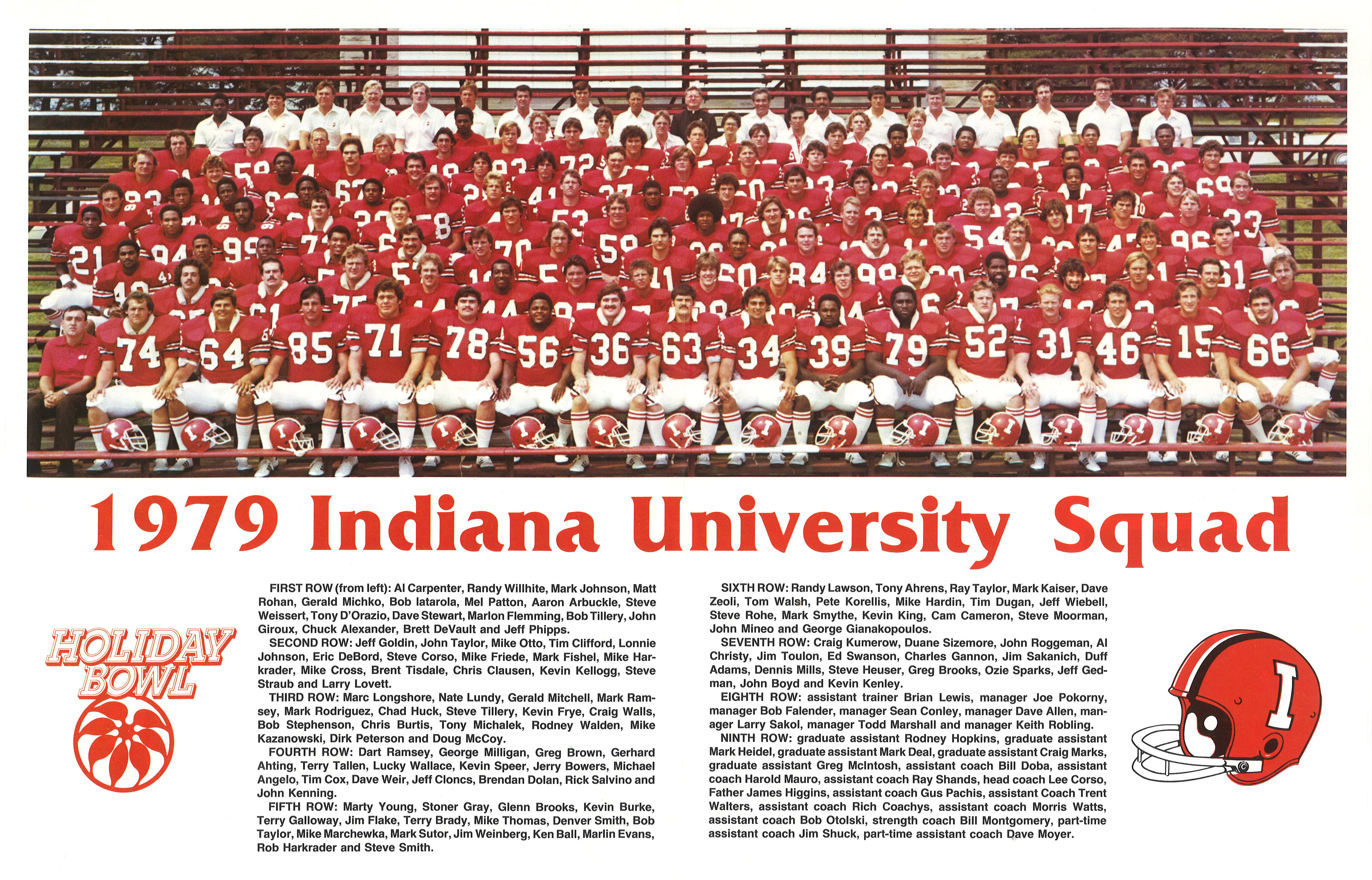
- Team photo of the 1979 Holiday Bowl

Holiday Bowl champion

Holiday Bowl, W 38–37 vs. BYU
- Conference: Big Ten Conference

Ranking
- Coaches: No. 16
- AP: No. 19
- Record: 8–4 (5–3 Big Ten)
- Head coach: Lee Corso (7th season)
- MVP: Tim Clifford
- Captains: Tim Clifford; Tony D'Orazio; Terry Tallen; Brent Tisdale
- Home stadium: Memorial Stadium

1979 Big Ten Conference football standings
	Conf.					Overall
Team	W		L		T	W		L		T
No. 4 Ohio State $	8	–	0	–	0	11	–	1	–	0
No. 10 Purdue	7	–	1	–	0	10	–	2	–	0
No. 18 Michigan	6	–	2	–	0	8	–	4	–	0
No. 19 Indiana	5	–	3	–	0	8	–	4	–	0
Iowa	4	–	4	–	0	5	–	6	–	0
Minnesota	3	–	5	–	1	4	–	6	–	1
Michigan State	3	–	5	–	0	5	–	6	–	0
Wisconsin	3	–	5	–	0	4	–	7	–	0
Illinois	1	–	6	–	1	2	–	8	–	1
Northwestern	0	–	9	–	0	1	–	10	–	0
$ – Conference champion; Rankings from AP Poll

The 1979 Indiana Hoosiers football team represented the Indiana Hoosiers in the 1979 Big Ten Conference football season. The Hoosiers played their home games at Memorial Stadium in Bloomington, Indiana. The team was coached by Lee Corso, in his seventh year as head coach of the Hoosiers. The Hoosiers participated in the Holiday Bowl, in a post-season matchup against BYU. The Hoosiers won, 38–37.

In the Old Oaken Bucket, the Hoosiers lost to Purdue by a score of 37–21.

== Schedule ==
Date	Opponent	Site	Result	Attendance	Source
September 8	at Iowa	Kinnick Stadium; Iowa City, IA	W 30–26	59,780	
September 15	Vanderbilt*	Memorial Stadium; Bloomington, IN	W 44–13	30,685	
September 22	Kentucky*	Memorial Stadium; Bloomington, IN (rivalry)	W 18–10	45,920	
September 29	Colorado*	Memorial Stadium; Bloomington, IN	L 16–17	36,160	
October 6	at Wisconsin	Camp Randall Stadium; Madison, WI	W 3–0	74,188	
October 13	at No. 8 Ohio State	Ohio Stadium; Columbus, OH	L 6–47	87,521	
October 20	Northwestern^{†}	Memorial Stadium; Bloomington, IN	W 30–0	30,086	
October 27	at No. 10 Michigan	Michigan Stadium; Ann Arbor, MI	L 21–27	104,832	
November 3	Minnesota	Memorial Stadium; Bloomington, IN	W 42–24	35,507	
November 10	at Illinois	Memorial Stadium; Champaign, IL (rivalry)	W 45–14	30,874	
November 17	No. 12 Purdue	Memorial Stadium; Bloomington, IN (Old Oaken Bucket)	L 21–37	53,202	
December 21	vs. No. 9 BYU*	San Diego Stadium; San Diego, CA (Holiday Bowl)	W 38–37	52,200	
*Non-conference game; ^{†}Homecoming; Rankings from AP Poll released prior to the game

== Roster ==
1979 Indiana Hoosiers football team roster
Players
Coaches
Offense

Pos.	#	Name	Class
OT	73	Gerhard Ahting	Jr
QB	14	Tim Clifford (C)	Jr
WR	7	Steve Corso	Sr
WR	88	Mike Friede	Sr
TE	81	Dave Harangody	Jr
RB	24	Mike Harkrader	Jr
RB	44	Lonnie Johnson	Jr
OL	70	Lucky Wallace	Jr

Defense

Pos.	#	Name	Class
DB	21	Dart Ramsey
DB	13	Mark Sutor	Fr
DL	62	Terry Tallen (C)	Sr
LB	60	Craig Walls	So
DB	8	Tim Wilbur	So
LB	64	Randy Willhite
DL	97	Brent Tisdale (C)	Sr

Special teams

Pos.	#	Name	Class
K	3	Kevin Kellogg	Jr
P	6	Larry Lovett	Jr
K	9	Steve Straub	Sr

Head coach

- Lee Corso

Coordinators/assistant coaches

- Bill Doba – Linebackers
- Bob Otolski – Special teams
- Gus Pachis
- Morris Watts

Legend

- (C) Team captain
- (S) Suspended
- (I) Ineligible
- Injured
- Redshirt

== Game summaries ==
=== At Iowa ===
Indiana at Iowa

Team	1	2	3	4	Total
• Hoosiers	0	3	7	20	30
Hawkeyes	13	13	0	0	26

- Date: September 8
- Location: Kinnick Stadium, Iowa City, Iowa
- Game attendance: 59,780

Scoring summary
1		IOWA	Dennis Mosley 23-yard run (kick failed)	IOWA 6–0
1		IOWA	Mosley 5-yard run (Schilling kick)	IOWA 13–0
2		Indiana	Straub 29-yard field goal	IOWA 13–3
2		IOWA	Mosley 5-yard pass from Suess (Schilling kick)	IOWA 20–3
2	3:06	IOWA	Mosley 1-yard run (pass failed)	IOWA 26–3
3		Indiana	Johnson 51-yard pass from Clifford (Straub kick)	IOWA 26–10
4		Indiana	Johnson 1-yard run (pass failed)	IOWA 26–16
4		Indiana	Clifford 1-yard run (Straub kick)	IOWA 26–23
4	0:58	Indiana	Johnson 66-yard pass from Clifford (Straub kick)	Indiana 30–26

On October 22, 2016, former Indiana University coach and current ESPN College Football analyst Lee Corso described the game on College Gameday. He said at halftime he told the Hoosiers (who were losing the game 26–3) to not bother coming out for the 2nd half unless they were prepared to win the game. Indiana would then go on to win the game 30–26. This was also the debut for Iowa's new head coach Hayden Fry.

=== At Ohio State ===
Indiana at Ohio State

Team	1	2	3	4	Total
Hoosiers	0	0	6	0	6
• No. 8 Buckeyes	9	17	14	7	47

- Date: October 13
- Location: Ohio Stadium
- Game start: 1:30 p.m.
- Elapsed time: 2:48
- Game attendance: 87,251
- Game weather: Cloudy; 44 °F (7 °C); wind 15 mph (24 km/h) NW

Scoring summary
Q1	11:38	OHST	Campbell 2-yard run (kick failed)	OHST 6–0
Q1	5:51	OHST	Janakievski 32-yard field goal	OHST 9–0
Q2	11:23	OHST	Janakievski 35-yard field goal	OHST 12–0
Q2	3:50	OHST	Campbell 3-yard run (Janakievski kick)	OHST 19–0
Q2	:28	OHST	Donley 21-yard pass from Schlichter (Janakievski kick)	OHST 26–0
Q3	11:22	OHST	Volley 2-yard run (Janakievski kick)	OHST 33–0
Q3	7:14	OHST	Schlichter 5-yard run (Janakievski kick)	OHST 40–0
Q3	:57	IND	Clifford 2-yard run (run failed)	OHST 40–6
Q4	3:58	OHST	Hicks 11-yard pass from Castignola (Janakievski kick)	OHST 47–6

=== At Michigan ===
Indiana at Michigan

Team	1	2	3	4	Total
Hoosiers	0	14	0	7	21
• No. 10 Wolverines	7	0	14	6	27

- Date: October 27
- Location: Michigan Stadium, Ann Arbor, Michigan
- Game attendance: 104,832

Scoring summary
1		MICH	Lawrence Reid 3-yard run (Virgil kick)	MICH 7-0
2		IND	Dave Harangody 3-yard pass from Tim Clifford (Kellogg kick)	Tied 7-7
2		IND	Lonnie Johnson 14-yard run (Kellogg kick)	IND 14-7
3		MICH	Lawrence Reid 50-yard run (Virgil kick)	Tied 14-14
3		MICH	Butch Woolfolk 2-yard run (Virgil kick)	MICH 21-14
4	0:55	IND	Dave Harangody 3-yard pass from Tim Clifford (Kellogg kick)	Tied 21-21
4	0:00	MICH	Anthony Carter 45-yard pass from John Wangler	MICH 27-21

=== Vs. BYU (Holiday Bowl) ===
Indiana vs. BYU

Team	1	2	3	4	Total
• Hoosiers	14	7	10	7	38
No. 9 Cougars	14	3	13	7	37

- Date: December 21
- Location: San Diego Stadium, San Diego, California
- Game attendance: 52,500

Scoring summary
1	BYU	Eric Lane 1-yard touchdown run (Brent Johnson kick)	BYU 7-0
1	IND	Bob Stephenson 38-yard touchdown pass from Tim Clifford (Kevin Kellog kick)	Tied 7-7
1	IND	Clifford 1-yard touchdown run (Kellog kick)	IND 14-7
1	BYU	Marc Wilson 3-yard touchdown run (Johnson kick)	Tied 14-14
2	BYU	Johnson 40-yard field goal	BYU 17-14
2	IND	Clifford 1-yard touchdown run (Kellog kick)	IND 21-17
3	BYU	Homer Jones 13-yard touchdown pass from Wilson (Johnson kick)	BYU 24-21
3	IND	Mike Harkrader 1-yard touchdown run (Kellog kick)	IND 28-24
3	IND	Kellog 26-yard field goal	IND 31-24
3	BYU	Johnson 29-yard field goal	IND 31-27
3	BYU	Johnson 46-yard field goal	IND 31-30
4	BYU	Eric Lane 15-yard touchdown pass from Wilson (Johnson kick)	BYU 37-31
4	IND	Tim Wilbur 62-yard punt return (Kellog kick)	IND 38-37

== Awards and honors ==
- Tim Clifford, Chicago Tribune Silver Football

== 1980 NFL draftees ==
Player	Position	Round	Pick	NFL club
Mike Friede	Wide receiver	3	62	Detroit Lions
