= 1979 Illinois Fighting Illini football team =

American college football season

1979 Illinois Fighting Illini football
- Conference: Big Ten Conference
- Record: 2–8–1 (1–6–1 Big Ten)
- Head coach: Gary Moeller (3rd season)
- MVP: Lawrence McCullough
- Captains: Lawrence McCullough; Stanley Ralph
- Home stadium: Memorial Stadium

1979 Big Ten Conference football standings
	Conf.					Overall
Team	W		L		T	W		L		T
No. 4 Ohio State $	8	–	0	–	0	11	–	1	–	0
No. 10 Purdue	7	–	1	–	0	10	–	2	–	0
No. 18 Michigan	6	–	2	–	0	8	–	4	–	0
No. 19 Indiana	5	–	3	–	0	8	–	4	–	0
Iowa	4	–	4	–	0	5	–	6	–	0
Minnesota	3	–	5	–	1	4	–	6	–	1
Michigan State	3	–	5	–	0	5	–	6	–	0
Wisconsin	3	–	5	–	0	4	–	7	–	0
Illinois	1	–	6	–	1	2	–	8	–	1
Northwestern	0	–	9	–	0	1	–	10	–	0
$ – Conference champion; Rankings from AP Poll

The 1979 Illinois Fighting Illini football team was an American football team that represented the University of Illinois as a member of the Big Ten Conference during the 1979 Big Ten season. In their third year under head coach Gary Moeller, the Illini compiled a 2–8–1 record (1–6–1), finished in ninth place in the Big Ten, and were outscored by a total of 266 to 156.

The team's statistical leaders included quarterback Lawrence McCullough (1,254 passing yards, 57.0% completion percentage), running back Mike Holmes (792 rushing yards, 5.4 yards per carry, 36 points scored), and wide receiver John Lopez (296 receiving yards). McCullough was selected as the team's most valuable player.

The team played its home games at Memorial Stadium in Champaign, Illinois.

== Schedule ==
Date	Opponent	Site	Result	Attendance	Source
September 8	at No. 10 Michigan State	Spartan Stadium; East Lansing, MI	L 16–33	71,125	
September 15	No. 11 Missouri*	Memorial Stadium; Champaign, IL (rivalry)	L 6–14	49,049	
September 22	at Air Force*	Falcon Stadium; Colorado Springs, CO	W 27–19	18,178	
September 29	Navy*	Memorial Stadium; Champaign, IL	L 12–13	53,825	
October 6	Iowa	Memorial Stadium; Champaign, IL	L 7–13	51,044	
October 13	at No. 20 Purdue	Ross–Ade Stadium; West Lafayette, IN (rivalry)	L 14–28	69,413	
October 20	No. 11 Michigan	Memorial Stadium; Champaign, IL (rivalry)	L 7–27	43,370	
October 27	at Minnesota	Memorial Stadium; Minneapolis, MN	T 17–17	47,406	
November 3	No. 5 Ohio State	Memorial Stadium; Champaign, IL (Illibuck)	L 7–44	41,870	
November 10	Indiana	Memorial Stadium; Champaign, IL (rivalry)	L 14–45	30,874	
November 17	at Northwestern	Dyche Stadium; Evanston, IL (rivalry)	W 29–13	19,217	
*Non-conference game; Rankings from AP Poll released prior to the game

== Roster ==
1979 Illinois Fighting Illini football team roster
Players
Coaches
Offense

Pos.	#	Name	Class
OT	71	Lou Belmont	So
C	63	Greg Boeke	Jr
TE	80	Lee Boeke	Jr
QB	9	Tim McAvoy	Jr
C	53	Mike McBeth	Sr
G	76	Bob McClure	Sr
QB	11	Lawrence McCullough	Sr
G	62	Troy McMillin	Jr
G	78	Ray Pavesic	Sr
C	51	John Scott	Jr
WR	12	Kenny Shaw	So
TE	81	Mike Sherrod	Sr
QB	10	Nick Sowa	Sr
FB	42	Calvin Thomas	So
QB	14	Rich Weiss	Jr

Defense

Pos.	#	Name	Class
DB	15	Bonji Bonner	So
DT	73	Reggie Brown	Jr
OLB	31	Pete Burgard	So
OLB	58	Tab Carmien	Jr
LB	90	Chris Carr	Sr
DB	35	Bill Forrester	So
DB	6	Rick George	So
LB	38	John Gillen	Jr
DL	87	Ken Gillen	So
LB	45	Bob Hauser	Sr
DB	48	Tim Holm	Sr
LB	89	Dan MacLean	Sr
DT	86	Stanley Ralph	Sr
LB	85	Jerry Ramshaw	Sr
LB	34	Jack Squirek	So
CB	16	Tyron Worthy	So
DB	39	Mark Zimmer	So

Special teams

Pos.	#	Name	Class
K	3	Cliff Jones	Jr

Head coach

- Gary Moeller

Coordinators/assistant coaches

- Brad Childress (Running backs)

Legend

- (C) Team captain
- (S) Suspended
- (I) Ineligible
- Injured
- Redshirt

Roster
