= 1979 Northwestern Wildcats football team =

American college football season

1979 Northwestern Wildcats football
- Conference: Big Ten Conference
- Record: 1–10 (0–9 Big Ten)
- Head coach: Rick Venturi (2nd season)
- Captains: Kevin Berg; Mike Fiedler
- Home stadium: Dyche Stadium

1979 Big Ten Conference football standings
	Conf.					Overall
Team	W		L		T	W		L		T
No. 4 Ohio State $	8	–	0	–	0	11	–	1	–	0
No. 10 Purdue	7	–	1	–	0	10	–	2	–	0
No. 18 Michigan	6	–	2	–	0	8	–	4	–	0
No. 19 Indiana	5	–	3	–	0	8	–	4	–	0
Iowa	4	–	4	–	0	5	–	6	–	0
Minnesota	3	–	5	–	1	4	–	6	–	1
Michigan State	3	–	5	–	0	5	–	6	–	0
Wisconsin	3	–	5	–	0	4	–	7	–	0
Illinois	1	–	6	–	1	2	–	8	–	1
Northwestern	0	–	9	–	0	1	–	10	–	0
$ – Conference champion; Rankings from AP Poll

The 1979 Northwestern Wildcats team represented Northwestern University during the 1979 Big Ten Conference football season. In their second year under head coach Rick Venturi, the Wildcats compiled a 1–10 record (0–9 against Big Ten Conference opponents) and finished in last place in the Big Ten Conference.

The team's offensive leaders were quarterback Mike Kerrigan with 961 passing yards, Jeff Cohn with 426 rushing yards, and Todd Sheets with 614 receiving yards.

Northwestern's 54–21 loss to Syracuse on September 22 began a 34-game losing streak, the longest in NCAA Division I Football Bowl Subdivision (FBS) history. The Wildcats did not win another game until September 25, 1982.

== Schedule ==
Date	Opponent	Site	Result	Attendance	Source
September 8	at No. 7 Michigan	Michigan Stadium; Ann Arbor, MI (rivalry)	L 7–49	100,790	
September 15	Wyoming*	Dyche Stadium; Evanston, IL	W 27–22		
September 22	Syracuse*	Dyche Stadium; Evanston, IL	L 21–54	20,121	
September 29	at Minnesota	Memorial Stadium; Minneapolis, MN	L 8–38	33,998	
October 6	at No. 8 Ohio State	Ohio Stadium; Columbus, OH	L 7–16	87,406	
October 13	Iowa	Dyche Stadium; Evanston, IL	L 6–58	27,224	
October 20	at Indiana	Memorial Stadium; Bloomington, IN	L 0–30	30,086	
October 27	at No. 16 Purdue	Ross–Ade Stadium; West Lafayette, IN	L 16–20	69,656	
November 3	Michigan State	Dyche Stadium; Evanston, IL	L 7–42	20,193	
November 10	at Wisconsin	Camp Randall Stadium; Madison, WI	L 3–28	68,229	
November 17	Illinois	Dyche Stadium; Evanston, IL (rivalry)	L 13–29	19,217	
*Non-conference game; Rankings from AP Poll released prior to the game

== Roster ==
1979 Northwestern Wildcats football team roster
Players
Coaches
Offense

Pos.	#	Name	Class
WR	84	Dave Bahoric	So
WR	83	Steve Bogan	So
RB	44	David Callway	Fr
RB	33	Mike Cammon	Jr
QB	11	Chris Capstran	So
G	67	Jim Crowder	So
RB	30	Jeff Cohn	Fr
RB	34	Keith Dennis	Fr
G	65	Bill Draznik	Jr
RB	3	Ricky Edwards	Fr
C	57	Mike Fielder	Sr
TE	93	John Finn	So
OT	76	Jim Ford	Jr
G	70	Bill Greer	Sr
RB	23	Tim Hill	Jr
RB	41	Dave Hoffman	Jr
RB	36	Don Johnson	Jr
TE	85	Wally Kaspryscki	Sr
QB	12	Mike Kerrigan	So
G	59	Kevin Kenyon	Sr
RB	8	Darryl Lyons	So
RB	32	Dave Mishler	Jr
WR	82	Tom North	Jr
QB	17	Mike Potts	Fr
TE, K	89	Sam Poulos	Sr
OT	55	Phil Reitz	Sr
OT	71	John Schober	Sr
WR	26	Todd Sheets	Jr
QB	13	Kevin Strasser	Sr
OT	75	Rob Taylor	So
RB	22	Greg Washington
RB	1	Jo Jo Webb	So
WR	25	Bill Weir	Jr

Defense

Pos.	#	Name	Class
DB	20	Mark Adams	Jr
FS	15	Bobby Anderson	Fr
DT	94	Don Bambauer	So
DB	22	Dave Bayer	Jr
LB	98	Kevin Berg	Sr
DT	66	Kelby Brown	So
S	24	John Burns	Jr
DB	37	Ben Butler	So
DB	14	Ron Coleman	Jr
LB	49	Doug Dorsey	So
LB	38	Scott Duncan	Sr
DT	99	Curt Grelle	Sr
DB	29	Roosevelt Groves	Fr
DB	2	Dana Hemphill	Jr
LB	80	Chris Hinton	Fr
LB	92	Steve Kaiser	Fr
LB	21	Chuck Kern	Jr
LB	48	Matt Lizak	So
DB	43	Tom McGlade	Jr
DL	86	Jack Mead	Fr
LB	62	Jim Miller	Sr
LB	91	Steve Pals	Jr
LB	97	Dean Payne	Jr
DL	73	Bruce Robinett	Sr
DB	18	David Shaw	Fr
DL	40	Brian Stasiewicz	Jr
DB	42	Lou Tiberi	So
DB	19	Don Westerhausen	Jr
DT	74	Norm Wells	Sr

Special teams

Pos.	#	Name	Class
K	90	Jay Anderson	Fr
P	28	Bob Schmitt	Jr

Head coach

- Rick Venturi

Coordinators/assistant coaches

- Mike Westhoff – Offensive line

Legend

- (C) Team captain
- (S) Suspended
- (I) Ineligible
- Injured
- Redshirt

== Team players in the NFL ==
Player	Position	Round	Pick	NFL club
Norm Wells	Guard	12	330	Dallas Cowboys
