= Tim Clifford =

American football player (1958–2024)

Indiana Hoosiers
- Position: Quarterback

Personal information
- Born: November 28, 1958
- Died: October 23, 2024 (aged 65)
- Listed height: 6 ft 1 in (1.85 m)
- Listed weight: 200 lb (91 kg)

Career information
- High school: Colerain (Cincinnati)
- College: Indiana (1977–1980)

Awards and highlights
- Big Ten Most Valuable Player (1979); Second-team All-Big Ten (1979)

Timothy R. Clifford Sr. (November 28, 1958 – October 23, 2024) was an American college football player who was a quarterback for the Indiana Hoosiers from 1977 to 1980. He won the Big Ten Most Valuable Player in 1979.

== Early life ==
Clifford grew up in Cincinnati where he played football, basketball, baseball and track at Colerain High School.

== Indiana University ==
Clifford attended the Indiana University Bloomington where he played varsity football and baseball. He was a pitcher for the baseball team and played at the quarterback position for the school's football team from 1977 to 1980. He became the school's all-time leader in passing yardage. In his four years at Indiana, Clifford completed 333 of 631 passes for 4,338 yards, 31 touchdowns, and 32 interceptions.

As a junior, Clifford totaled 2,078 passing yards and led the 1979 Indiana Hoosiers football team to an 8–4 record and the program's first victory in a bowl game, a 38–37 victory over BYU in the 1979 Holiday Bowl. In September 1978, he completed 11 passes for 345 yards and five touchdowns in a 49–7 victory over Colorado. During the 1979 season, Clifford set Indiana single-season records in pass attempts (259), completions (149), passing yardage (1,907 in regular season games), and total offense (1,978 yards in regular season games).

At the end of the 1979 season, he won the Chicago Tribune Silver Football trophy as the most valuable player in the Big Ten Conference. He was the first Hoosier to win the Silver Football since Corbett Davis in 1937. Despite being selected as the conference MVP, Clifford did not receive first- or second-team honors from the Associated Press, as Art Schlichter and Mark Herrmann won those honors.

Clifford was a team co-captain in both 1979 and 1980 and was selected as Indiana's team MVP in both of those years. He led the East team to a 21–3 victory in the 1981 East–West Shrine Game and shared offensive most valuable player honors with Amos Lawrence. Clifford also played in the Japan Bowl. He was drafted 260th overall by the Chicago Bears in the 10th round of the 1981 NFL draft.

== Later life and death ==
Clifford was inducted into the Indiana University Athletics Hall of Fame in 2008. From 1999, he was the business manager of St. Ann Church in Cincinnati.

Clifford died on October 23, 2024, at the age of 65.
