= 1979 Astro-Bluebonnet Bowl =

Tennessee Volunteers	Purdue Boilermakers
(7–4)	(9–2)
22	27
Head coach: Johnny Majors	Head coach: Jim Young
	AP / Coaches; 12 / 12
	1	2	3	4	Total
Tennessee	0	0	6	16	22
Purdue	0	14	7	6	27
- Date: December 31, 1979
- Season: 1979
- Stadium: Astrodome
- Location: Houston, Texas
- MVP: QB Mark Herrmann (Purdue)
- Referee: Guy Gibbs (WAC)

United States TV coverage
- Network: Mizlou Television Network
- Announcers: Merle Harmon, Don Perkins and Howard David

The 1979 Astro-Bluebonnet Bowl was a college football postseason game between the Purdue Boilermakers and the Tennessee Volunteers.

== Background ==
Tennessee won their first three games and entered the rankings at #19 before a game at Mississippi State. However, they fell out after losing to them 28–9 (the Bulldogs would go 3–8 that season). A win at Georgia Tech was followed by losses to #1 Alabama and Rutgers. A victory over #13 Notre Dame was their only win over a ranked opponent. They finished the season with a loss to Ole Miss and victories over Kentucky and Vanderbilt to place fifth in the Southeastern Conference. This was Tennessee's sixth bowl game in the decade. Purdue began the season ranked #6, and they won their opening game versus Wisconsin 41–20 at home. A loss to UCLA dropped them to #17, but they rose back to #12 after wins over #5 Notre Dame and Oregon. A loss to Minnesota was their last of the season, as they finished the season with six straight victories to finish 2nd in the Big Ten Conference. This was Purdue's second straight bowl appearance.

== Scoring summary ==
- Purdue - McCall 6-yard run (Seibel kick), 5:01
- Purdue - Burrell 12-yard pass from Herrmann (Seibel kick), 2:27
- Purdue - Young 12-yard pass from Herrmann (Seibel kick), 10:52
- Tennessee - Ford 8-yard pass from Streater (2-point conversion failed), 2:55
- Tennessee - Berry 15-yard pass from Ingram (Simpson run), 8:39
- Tennessee - Simpson 1-yard run (Simpson run), 3:42
- Purdue - Young 17-yard pass from Herrmann (pass failed), 1:30

Purdue: Mark Herrmann went 21-of-39 for three touchdowns and 303 yards. Purdue had 31 first downs to Tennessee's 19, while outrushing them 180 to 146, out passing them 303 to 234, and keeping the ball for 33 minutes. Tennessee turned the ball over five times; Purdue only turned it over once.

== Aftermath ==
This remains Purdue's only 10 win season. They reached two more bowl games in the next five years before going without bowl games until 1997. In contrast, Tennessee reached seven bowl games in the next decade. Neither ever returned to the Bluebonnet Bowl again.
