= Mark Carlson (quarterback) =

American football player

Profile
- Position: Quarterback

Career information
- College: Minnesota (1976–1979)

Mark Carlson was an American football quarterback who played for the Minnesota Golden Gophers football team from 1976 to 1979, and later for the Chicago Fire of the now-defunct American Football Association. During his senior year in 1979, Carlson passed for 2188 yards and 11 touchdowns, which was good enough to earn him Team MVP honors on a squad that finished 4–6–1 under first-year head coach Joe Salem.

== Biography ==
Carlson played high school football at Deerfield High School under noted coach Paul Adams.

During his tenure with the Gophers, Carlson competed with Wendell Avery for the starting quarterback position, both having varying success at different times during this period. Carlson first made a name for himself during his sophomore season in 1977, in one of the biggest wins in Gopher history. The Gophers were scheduled to face the Michigan Wolverine team in their annual Little Brown Jug game, which would be played at the Gopher's Memorial Stadium. Michigan was coming into the contest as the number one ranked team in the country with a 6–0 record. The Gophers – who were 4–2 at the time with wins over Washington and UCLA – still were considered major underdogs against the Wolverines and Bo Schembechler. What added to the Gopher's uncertainty was that they still didn't know who their starting quarterback was going to be. After having former Gopher hero Butch Nash give a rousing pep talk on the Friday night before the game, Minnesota's head coach Cal Stoll met with all three of his top quarterbacks to decide who would be the starter for the big game. "I kept looking in their eyes when I talked to them." Stoll would later say, – "Mark Carlson was looking right back into my eyes. I made a gut decision right then that he would be my quarterback." Sure enough Carlson, a sophomore who hadn't played a minute all season up to that point, was under center as the Gopher's starting quarterback. The Gophers, with a tremendous defensive effort and the solid kicking of Paul Rogind, ended up shocking Michigan 16–0 to earn their first Little Brown Jug since 1967 and handing the Wolverines their first shutout in 112 games.

Carlson played professionally for the Chicago Fire of the American Football Association in 1981.

Carlson has a son named Kevin Carlson who ended up as a catcher in baseball, who played for both the Minnesota Gophers and the St. Paul Saints.
