= Jim Laughlin =

American football player (born 1958)

No. 51, 62, 57, 93
- Position: Linebacker

Personal information
- Born: July 5, 1958 (age 68); Euclid, Ohio, U.S.
- Listed height: 6 ft 0 in (1.83 m)
- Listed weight: 222 lb (101 kg)

Career information
- High school: Charles F. Brush (Lyndhurst, Ohio)
- College: Ohio State
- NFL draft: 1980: 4th round, 91st overall pick

Career history
- Atlanta Falcons (1980–1982); Green Bay Packers (1983); Los Angeles Rams (1984–1986); Atlanta Falcons (1987)

Awards and highlights
- First-team All-Big Ten (1979)

Career NFL statistics
- Interceptions: 2
- Fumble recoveries: 1
- Sacks: 1
- Stats at Pro Football Reference

James David Laughlin (born July 5, 1958) is an American former professional football player who was a linebacker in the National Football League (NFL). He played college football for the Ohio State Buckeyes. Laughlin selected in the fourth round of the 1980 NFL draft by the Atlanta Falcons with the 91st overall pick.

== Playing career ==
Laughlin played high school football at Charles F. Brush High School in his hometown of Lyndhurst, Ohio. He graduated from Charles F. Brush High school in 1976.

As a team captain during his senior year of 1979 at Ohio State, Laughlin (along with Mike D'Andrea) had a share in a blocked punt against Michigan, which was returned for what eventually proved to be the winning touchdown by Todd Bell. The play put the Buckeyes on top 18–15, sending the team to the 1980 Rose Bowl. In 1979 Laughlin was the Buckeyes MVP and an Academic All-Big Ten Conference honoree. He was also a 1979 winner of the National Football Foundation and Hall of Fame Scholarship, awarded annually to the top 13 players in college football.
