= Jimmy Smith (running back) =

American football player (born 1960)

No. 40, 29, 43
- Position: Running back

Personal information
- Born: September 25, 1960 (age 66); Kankakee, Illinois, U.S.
- Listed height: 6 ft 0 in (1.83 m)
- Listed weight: 205 lb (93 kg)

Career information
- High school: Westview (Kankakee)
- College: Purdue (1979–1981); Elon (1982–1983)
- NFL draft: 1984: 4th round, 102nd overall pick

Career history
- Washington Redskins (1984); Los Angeles Raiders (1984); Minnesota Vikings (1987)

Career NFL statistics
- Rushing yards: 13
- Rushing average: 1.9
- Return yards: 80
- Stats at Pro Football Reference

James Kevin Smith (born September 25, 1960) is an American former professional football player who was a running back in the National Football League (NFL) for the Los Angeles Raiders, Washington Redskins, and Minnesota Vikings. He was selected by Washington in the fourth round of the 1984 NFL draft. He played high school football in Kankakee, Illinois at Westview High School there before the merging of Westview and Eastridge High.

Smith played college football for the Purdue Boilermakers for three seasons (1979–81) before transferring to the Elon Phoenix for the remainder of his collegiate career. In 1978, Smith was named All-State player of the year in the state of Illinois. He briefly played with the Green Bay Packers.

At Purdue, Smith totaled 1,466 yards and 15 touchdowns on 360 carries. He was a member of Purdue's 1979 Bluebonnet Bowl and 1980 Liberty Bowl championship teams.
