= Tim Burke (gridiron football) =

American born Canadian football coach

Profile
- Position: Running back

Career information
- College: Luther College (Iowa) (1974–1977)

Career history

Playing
- 1974–1977: Luther College (Iowa)

Coaching
- 1977–1979: Minnesota; Assistant coach
- 1980: Gardner–Webb; Assistant coach
- 1981: Appalachian State; Assistant coach
- 1982–1985: South Dakota; Defensive coordinator/defensive backs coach
- 1986–1988: North Dakota; Defensive coordinator/defensive backs coach
- 1989–1991: Ball State; Defensive backs coach
- 1992–1994: Ball State; Defensive coordinator/defensive backs coach
- 1995–1996: Wyoming; Defensive backs coach
- 1997–1999: Purdue; Defensive backs coach
- 2000: Kansas; Defensive backs coach
- 2001: Kansas; Defensive line coach
- 2003: Tennessee–Chattanooga; Defensive coordinator/defensive backs coach
- 2004: Indiana State; Defensive coordinator/defensive backs coach
- 2005–2007: Calgary Stampeders; Defensive backs coach
- 2007: Calgary Stampeders; Defensive coordinator (interim)
- 2008–2010: Montreal Alouettes; Defensive coordinator/defensive backs coach
- 2011–2013: Winnipeg Blue Bombers; Defensive coordinator/defensive backs coach
- 2014: Toronto Argonauts; Defensive coordinator

Tim Burke is an American born Canadian football coach who was the defensive coordinator for the Toronto Argonauts of the Canadian Football League. Burke was previously the head coach of the CFL's Winnipeg Blue Bombers.

== Career ==
Burke played running back for Luther College in Decorah, Iowa from 1974 to 1977. After graduating in 1977, Burke started his coaching career with the University of Minnesota. He later coached at University of South Dakota, University of North Dakota, Ball State University, University of Wyoming, Indiana State University, and University of Kansas. His most notable NCAA coaching job was as the defensive backs coach for Purdue University from 1997 to 1999, where he was a part of two Alamo Bowl championship teams (1997, 1998)

Burke made the move to the CFL as the defensive backs coach with Calgary Stampeders from 2005 to 2007. He later joined the Montreal Alouettes as defensive coordinator under head coach Marc Trestman from 2008 to 2010, where he won two Grey Cups. In 2011, he took over as defensive coordinator for the Blue Bombers. The next year, Burke interviewed for the vacant Hamilton Tiger-Cats head coaching position, but did not get the job. He returned to the Blue Bombers for the 2012 season and was promoted to interim head coach on August 25 following the dismissal of Paul LaPolice. At the end of the season, the interim tag was removed and the Blue Bombers officially named Burke the 29th head coach in team history.

Burke was fired by the Blue Bombers only a year later, after the team finished last in the league with only three wins. Shortly after, the Toronto Argonauts hired Burke as their new defensive coordinator. Burke left the Argonauts after one year for personal reasons.

== Personal ==
Burke is a native of Cedar Rapids, Iowa. He and his wife Rita live in Lawrence, Kansas during the off-season.

Burke has two sons from a previous marriage: Kelly is a sergeant in the United States Air Force and Evan is a former member of the gymnastics team at Temple University.

== CFL coaching record ==
Team	Year	Regular season					Postseason		
Team	Year	Won	Lost	Ties	Win %	Finish	Won	Lost	Result
WPG	2012	4	6	0	.400	3rd in East Division	-	-	Missed playoffs
WPG	2013	3	15	0	.166	4th in East Division	-	-	Missed playoffs
Total		7	21	0	.250	0 Division; Championships	0	0	0 Grey Cups
