= 1980 Rose Bowl =

American college football game

- 66th Rose Bowl Game
USC Trojans	Ohio State Buckeyes
(10–0–1)	(11–0)
17	16
Head coach: John Robinson	Head coach: Earle Bruce
AP / Coaches; 3 / 2	AP / Coaches; 1 / 3
	1	2	3	4	Total
USC	3	7	0	7	17
Ohio State	0	10	3	3	16
- Date: January 1, 1980
- Season: 1979
- Stadium: Rose Bowl
- Location: Pasadena, California
- MVP: Charles White (USC RB)
- Favorite: USC by 7½ points
- Referee: Gene Calhoun (Big Ten) (split crew: Big Ten, Pac-10)
- Attendance: 105,526

United States TV coverage
- Network: NBC
- Announcers: Dick Enberg, Merlin Olsen, and O. J. Simpson
- Nielsen ratings: 28.6

The 1980 Rose Bowl was It was the 66th edition of the college football bowl game, played on Tuesday, January 1, at the Rose Bowl in Pasadena, California. The USC Trojans, champions of the Pacific-10 Conference, defeated the Ohio State Buckeyes, champions of the Big Ten Conference, 17–16.

USC's Heisman Trophy running back Charles White was named the Player of the Game (for a second time, having shared the previous game's award with Rick Leach), rushing for a record 247 yards, including the game-winning touchdown with little more than a minute remaining in the contest.

Ohio State entered the game with an 11–0 record, and was one of two undefeated and untied teams in the nation, along with Alabama. If the Buckeyes had won, they likely would have gained at least a share of the national championship, since they were ranked first in the AP Poll at kickoff.

The game received a 28.6 Nielsen Rating, making it one of the highest-rated college football games of all time.

USC, having suffered a shocking 21–21 tie with Stanford (a home game in which they led 21–0 at halftime) that cost them the #1 ranking in mid-October, was runner-up in both final polls, behind Alabama.

This was the sixth consecutive Rose Bowl win for the Pac-10, with ten wins in the last eleven.

== Scoring ==
First quarter

- USC – Eric Hipp 41-yard field goal

Second quarter

- USC – Kevin Williams 53-yard pass from Paul McDonald (Hipp kick)
- OSU – Vlade Janakievski 35-yard field goal
- OSU – Gary Williams 67-yard pass from Art Schlichter (Janakievski kick)

Third quarter

- OSU – Janakievski 37-yard field goal

Fourth quarter

- OSU – Janakievski, 24-yard field goal
- USC – Charles White 1-yard run (Hipp kick)
