= 1979 Holiday Bowl =

Indiana Hoosiers	BYU Cougars
(7–4)	(11–0)
Big Ten	WAC
38	37
Head coach: Lee Corso	Head coach: LaVell Edwards
	AP / Coaches; 9 / 9
	1	2	3	4	Total
Indiana	14	7	10	7	38
BYU	14	3	17	3	37
- Date: December 21, 1979
- Season: 1979
- Stadium: San Diego Stadium
- Location: San Diego, California
- MVP: Marc Wilson (BYU); Tim Wilbur (Indiana)
- Attendance: 52,500
- Payout: US$271,214 per team

The 1979 Holiday Bowl was a college football bowl game played December 21, 1979, in San Diego, California. It was part of the 1979 NCAA Division I-A football season. It featured the Indiana Hoosiers against the BYU Cougars. Indiana won 38–37.

== Background ==
Indiana won seven games to complete their first winning season since 1968 while qualifying for a bowl game for the first time since the Rose Bowl team of 1967, while finishing fourth in the Big Ten Conference. Western Athletic Conference champion BYU was a perfect 11-0 going into this game, having risen from #20 to #9 by the fourth game, with a win over #14 Texas A&M beginning a season that saw the most wins in one season in school history up to that point.

== Game summary ==
- BYU – Eric Lane 1-yard touchdown run (Brent Johnson kick)
- Indiana – Bob Stephenson 38-yard touchdown pass from Tim Clifford (Kevin Kellog kick)
- Indiana – Clifford 1-yard touchdown run (Kellog kick)
- BYU – Marc Wilson 3-yard touchdown run (Johnson kick)
- BYU – Johnson 40-yard field goal
- Indiana – Clifford 1-yard touchdown run (Kellog kick)
- BYU – Homer Jones 13-yard touchdown pass from Wilson (Johnson kick)
- Indiana – Mike Harkrader 1-yard touchdown run (Kellog kick)
- Indiana – Kellog 26-yard field goal
- BYU – Johnson 29-yard field goal
- BYU – Eric Lane 15-yard touchdown pass from Wilson (Johnson kick)
- Indiana – Tim Wilbur 62-yard punt return (Kellog kick)

The game, which featured an 11-0 BYU team going against a 7-4 Indiana team coached by future ESPN college football analyst Lee Corso, went back and forth from start to finish. The Cougars held a 37–31 lead late in the fourth quarter when Tim Wilbur took a punt back for 62 yards and a touchdown for the go-ahead score. Brent Johnson's 27 yard field goal attempt with seven seconds to go was blocked and Indiana held on to get their first ever bowl win in school history. Wilbur was named co-MVP, along with Marc Wilson of BYU, who threw 28-of-43 for 380 yards with 2 touchdowns and 3 interceptions while rushing for 40 yards on 9 carries for a touchdown.

== Statistics ==
Statistics	Indiana	BYU
First downs	21	31
Rushing yards	183	140
Passing yards	171	380
Total Net Yards	354	520
Passing	11–30–1	28–43–3
Fumbles–lost	1–0	1–1
Penalties–yards	7–70	1–15
Punts–average	6–41.3	2–38.0
Kickoff return yards	114	126
Punt return yards	66	30
Time of possession	35:07	24:53

== Aftermath ==
Indiana did not make a bowl game again until 1986, while BYU continued to make bowl games, including five more Holiday Bowls in a five-year span, with the 1980 team breaking the record for most wins a season with 12.
