= Ray Snell =

American football player (1958–2021)

No. 72, 61
- Position: Guard

Personal information
- Born: February 24, 1958; Baltimore, Maryland, U.S.
- Died: September 28, 2021 (aged 63); Tampa, Florida, U.S.
- Listed height: 6 ft 4 in (1.93 m)
- Listed weight: 262 lb (119 kg)

Career information
- High school: Northwestern (Baltimore, Maryland)
- College: Wisconsin
- NFL draft: 1980: 1st round, 22nd overall pick

Career history
- Tampa Bay Buccaneers (1980–1983); Pittsburgh Steelers (1984–1985); Detroit Lions (1985)

Awards and highlights
- PFWA All-Rookie Team (1980); Second-team All-American (1979); First-team All-Big Ten (1979)

Career NFL statistics
- Games played: 65
- Games started: 42
- Fumble recoveries: 1
- Stats at Pro Football Reference

Ray Michael Snell (February 24, 1958 – September 28, 2021) was an American professional football player who was a guard in the National Football League (NFL) for the Tampa Bay Buccaneers, Pittsburgh Steelers and the Detroit Lions. Tampa Bay, using their 4th ever first round draft pick, acquired Snell with the 22nd pick in the first round of the 1980 NFL draft. After four seasons in Tampa Bay in which he started 46 of 64 games he was traded to the Pittsburgh Steelers. Once in Pittsburgh he immediately started 13 games. In 1986, he suffered a blow out fracture to the right eye, in which a bone was lodged behind it. He was then traded to the Detroit Lions where he retired. During 1981, he and George Yarno alternated plays bringing in the offensive play call for Doug Williams.

Ray Snell died of cancer in Tampa on September 28, 2021, at the age of 63.
