= Joe Salem (American football) =

American football player and coach (born 1938)

Biographical details
- Born: May 1, 1938 (age 88); Sioux Falls, South Dakota, U.S.

Playing career
- 1958–1960: Minnesota
- Position: Quarterback

Coaching career (HC unless noted)
- 1961–1965: Minnesota (assistant)
- 1966–1974: South Dakota
- 1975–1978: Northern Arizona
- 1979–1983: Minnesota
- 2006–2009: Augustana (SD) (QB)

Head coaching record
- Overall: 96–91–3
- Tournaments: 0–2 (NCAA D-II playoffs)

Accomplishments and honors

Championships
- 3 NCC (1972–1974); 1 Big Sky (1978)

Joseph N. "Smokey Joe" Salem (born May 1, 1938) is an American former college football player and coach. He served as the head football coach at the University of South Dakota (1966–1974), Northern Arizona University (1975–1978), and the University of Minnesota (1979–1983), compiling a career head coaching record of 96–91–3. Salem was most recently the quarterbacks coach at Augustana College in Sioux Falls, South Dakota, a position he held from 2006 to 2009.

== Head coaching record ==
Year	Team	Overall	Conference	Standing	Bowl/playoffs
South Dakota Coyotes (North Central Conference) (1966–1974)
1966	South Dakota	5–5	2–4	T–4th	
1967	South Dakota	2–8	0–6	7th	
1968	South Dakota	9–1	5–1	2nd	
1969	South Dakota	3–7	2–4	T–5th	
1970	South Dakota	4–4–2	3–2–1	3rd	
1971	South Dakota	3–7	3–3	T–4th	
1972	South Dakota	9–1	6–1	T–1st	
1973	South Dakota	8–3	6–1	T–1st	L NCAA Division II Quarterfinal
1974	South Dakota	8–3	5–2	T–1st	
South Dakota:		51–39–2	32–24–1		
Northern Arizona Lumberjacks (Big Sky Conference) (1975–1978)
1975	Northern Arizona	1–9	0–6	7th	
1976	Northern Arizona	8–3	4–2	3rd	
1977	Northern Arizona	9–3	5–1	2nd	L NCAA Division II Quarterfinal
1978	Northern Arizona	8–2	6–0	1st	
Northern Arizona:		26–17	15–9		
Minnesota Golden Gophers (Big Ten Conference) (1979–1983)
1979	Minnesota	4–6–1	3–5–1	6th	
1980	Minnesota	5–6	4–5	5th	
1981	Minnesota	6–5	4–5	T–6th	
1982	Minnesota	3–8	1–8	10th	
1983	Minnesota	1–10	0–9	10th	
Minnesota:		19–35–1	12–32–1		
Total:		96–91–3			
National championship Conference title Conference division title or championship game berth
