= Dennis Mosley =

American football player (born 1957)

No. 18
- Position: Running back
- Class: Junior

Personal information
- Born: March 19, 1957 (age 69); Birmingham, Alabama, U.S.
- Listed height: 5 ft 10 in (1.78 m)
- Listed weight: 180 lb (82 kg)

Career information
- College: Iowa (1976–1979)

Awards and highlights
- Second-team All-American (1979); First-team All-Big Ten (1979); Big Ten rushing yards leader (1979)

Dennis Earl Mosley (born March 19, 1957) is an American former football running back. He attended the University of Iowa where he became the leading rusher in the Big Ten Conference in 1979. He also set Iowa records for single-season and career rushing yardage.

== Early life ==
Mosley was born in Birmingham, Alabama in 1957. He grew up in Youngstown, Ohio, and in high school, he was the state champion in 100-, 220- and 440-yard dashes.

== University of Iowa ==
Mosley played college football for the Iowa Hawkeyes from 1976 to 1979. His 1977 and 1978 seasons were cut short by elbow and hip injuries. As a senior, he led the Big Ten Conference with 1,267 rushing yards, 1,502 yards from scrimmage, and 16 touchdowns. On September 29, 1979, he rushed for a career-high 229 rushing yards and three touchdowns in Iowa's annual rivalry game with Iowa State. He was also selected as a first-team All-Big Ten running back in 1979 and as the most valuable player on the 1979 Iowa football team.

Mosley also had a 77-yard touchdown run against Iowa State in 1977. His 270 rushing carries in 1979 was also an Iowa record, breaking the previous record by 65 carries. He finished his career as Iowa's career rushing leader with 2,133 yards.

== Professional football ==
Mosley was selected by the Minnesota Vikings in the ninth round (232nd overall pick) of the 1980 NFL draft. In late August 1980, Mosley was cut by the Vikings before the start of the 1980 NFL season.

In the summer of 1981, Mosley participated in training camp and preseason games with the Ottawa Roughriders and Winnipeg Blue Bombers.
