= Angelo Fields =

American football player (born 1957)

No. 77, 79
- Position: Offensive tackle

Personal information
- Born: September 15, 1957 (age 69); Washington, D.C., U.S.
- Listed height: 6 ft 6 in (1.98 m)
- Listed weight: 321 lb (146 kg)

Career information
- High school: Woodrow Wilson (Washington, D.C.)
- College: Michigan State
- NFL draft: 1980: 2nd round, 38th overall pick

Career history
- Houston Oilers (1980–1981); Green Bay Packers (1982); New Orleans Saints (1984)*
- * Offseason or practice squad member only

Awards and highlights
- Second-team All-Big Ten (1979)

Career NFL statistics
- Games played: 30
- Games started: 3
- Stats at Pro Football Reference

Angelo Bertell Fields (born September 15, 1957) is an American former professional football player who was an offensive tackle in the National Football League (NFL) for the Houston Oilers. He played college football for the Michigan State Spartans and was selected by the Oilers in the second round of the 1980 NFL draft.

== Football career ==
Fields was born in Washington D.C. where he attended Woodrow Wilson High School. Recruited to play collegiate football for Michigan State in 1976 where he played both offensive tackle and defensive tackle. During his time with the Spartans, Fields played alongside both Dan Bass and Larry Bethea. In 1977, MSU went 7-3-1 and in 1978 Michigan State won the Big Ten championship. However, the Spartans were on NCAA probation and unable to attend the Rose Bowl. He was selected in the second round of the 1980 NFL Draft by the Houston Oilers with whom he played three seasons before being released.
