= Ken Fritz =

American football player (1957–2024)

Profile
- Position: G

Personal information
- Born: November 21, 1957; Ironton, Ohio, U.S.
- Died: February 6, 2024 (aged 66)
- Listed height: 6 ft 3 in (1.91 m)
- Listed weight: 238 lb (108 kg)

Career information
- High school: Ironton
- College: Ohio State University

Career history
- 1976–1979: Ohio State

Awards and highlights
- Consensus All-American (1979); 2× First-team All-Big Ten (1978, 1979)

Ken Fritz (November 21, 1957 – February 6, 2024) was an American college football player who was a guard for the Ohio State Buckeyes. He was recognized as a consensus All-American in 1979.

== Early life ==
Fritz was born on November 21, 1957, in Ironton, Ohio. He graduated from Ironton High School, where he played on the football team and lettered three times. In 1975, he earned several honors including being named Southeastern Ohio Athletic League (SEOAL) Co-Player of the Year and Associated Press Ohio Class AA Lineman of the Year.

== College career ==
Fritz played and lettered for the Ohio State Buckeyes football team under coaches Woody Hayes during the 1976, 1977 and 1978 seasons and Earle Bruce in the 1979 season. He made All-Big Ten team in both the 1978 and 1979 seasons. At the end of the 1978 season Fritz restrained his coach Woody Hayes after he punched Clemson linebacker Charlie Bauman of Clemson University in the Gator Bowl. The television replay and several still photos also show Hayes punching Fritz as he restrained him, but Fritz at the time denied that he was punched. Fritz said “...He was just trying to wrestle his way free. He didn't want anyone to restrain him.” In 1979, his senior season, he helped the Buckeyes to a Big Ten championship with a perfect 11–0 regular season record, and a berth in the Rose Bowl. Following his senior year, as a 6-foot, 3-inch, 238-pound guard, he was recognized as a consensus All-American, having received first-team honors from several publications and organizations, including the Associated Press and United Press International. Fritz was drafted by the Pittsburgh Steelers in the 10th round (277 overall selection) of the 1980 NFL draft.

== Death ==
Fritz died on February 6, 2024, at the age of 66.
