= Vlade Janakievski =

American football player (born 1957)

Personal information
- Born: April 10, 1957 (age 69); SR Macedonia, Yugoslavia

Career information
- Position: Placekicker
- College: Ohio State (1977–1980)

Vlade Janakievski (born April 10, 1957) is a former American football placekicker for the Ohio State Buckeyes. Janakievski was born in the Socialist Republic of Macedonia while it was part of Yugoslavia and moved to the United States with his parents in 1967 at the age of 10. He graduated from Whitehall Yearling high School in 1976, where he was the placekicker on the football team.

He was a walk-on player from the soccer team who handled the placekicking duties for the Buckeyes in the 1977–1980 seasons.

During Janakievski's career at Ohio State he:

1. was the first Ohio State kicker to be chosen as an All-Big Ten selection, twice
2. is second in extra points made in a career (172)
3. is second in extra points attempted in a career (179)
4. is second in most consecutive field goals made (15) in 1979–80 season
5. is third for most kicking points in a career (295)
6. is tied for third for extra points made in a game (9 against Northwestern in 1978 and 1980)
7. is tied for third for extra points attempted in a game (9 against Northwestern in 1978 and 1980)
8. is tied for third for most field goals attempted in a single game (5) against Michigan in 1977
9. is fourth for extra points made in a career (41 of 61)
10. is fourth in most consecutive field goals made (10) in 1978–79 season
11. is fifth in consecutive extra points, 45-of-46 during the 1980 season
12. is fifth in the Ohio State record book for points scored in a career with 295 career points
13. is fifth for extra points attempted in a career (61)
14. is fifth for field goal percentage in a single season (.857, 18 of 21 in 1979)
15. is fifth for field goals made in Ohio Stadium (10 in 1978-79 and 10 in 1980)
16. is seventh for kicking points in a single season (97)
17. is seventh in consecutive extra points, 44-of-44 in 1977
18. is ninth in field goal percentage in a career (.672, 41 of 61)
19. is tied for ninth for extra points made in a game (8 against Wisconsin in 1979)
20. Held the OSU scoring record for 1979 (97 points) and 1980 (90)

He set these numerous records during his time playing for coaches Woody Hayes and Earle Bruce.

Janakievski finished his Buckeye career second of the Ohio State's all-time scoring list (behind Pete Johnson), with 179 career points. Nearly 20 years later he remains fifth on that list. Only Keith Byars, Dan Stultz, and Mike Nugent have since surpassed his career total.

Janakievski was selected to the Ohio State Football All-Century Team in 2000, and was inducted into the Ohio State Varsity O Hall of Fame in 2004.

Janakievski currently owns and operates a deli named "Easy Living Deli", located at 1355 W. Lane Ave, Columbus Oh., just a few minutes from The Ohio State University.
