= Gil Krueger =

American football player and coach (1929–2016)

Biographical details
- Born: May 28, 1929; Milwaukee, Wisconsin, U.S.
- Died: October 30, 2016 (aged 87); Walnut Creek, California, U.S.

Playing career

Football
- c. 1950: Marquette

Basketball
- 1949–1951: Marquette

Coaching career (HC unless noted)

Football
- 1954–1955: Grantsburg HS (WI) (assistant)
- 1956–1963: Stoughton HS (WI)
- 1964–1965: North Central (IL) (assistant)
- 1966–1968: Macalester
- 1969–1973: Platteville State / Wisconsin–Platteville
- 1974–1977: Northern Michigan
- 1978–1982: New Mexico State
- 1983: New Jersey Generals (assistant)
- 1984–1987: Wisconsin–Superior

Head coaching record
- Overall: 104–114–4 (college football); 52–11–1 (high school football)
- Tournaments: 0–1 (NAIA D-I playoffs); 4–2 (NCAA D-II playoffs)

Accomplishments and honors

Championships
- 1 NCAA Division II (1975); 3 WIAC (1969–1971); 1 MVC (1978)

Gilbert John Krueger (May 28, 1929 – October 30, 2016) was an American football coach. He served as the head football coach at Macalester College from 1966 to 1968, the University of Wisconsin–Platteville from 1969 to 1973, Northern Michigan University from 1974 to 1977, New Mexico State University from 1978 to 1982, and the University of Wisconsin–Superior from 1984 to 1987, compiling a career college football record of 104–114–4. At Northern Michigan, his team won the NCAA Division II Football Championship in 1975. He died in 2016, aged 87.

== Head coaching record ==
=== College ===
Year	Team	Overall	Conference	Standing	Bowl/playoffs
Macalester Scots (Minnesota Intercollegiate Athletic Conference) (1966–1968)
1966	Macalester	2–7	0–7	8th	
1967	Macalester	3–6	2–5	T–6th	
1968	Macalester	5–4–1	3–3–1	5th	
Macalester:		10–17–1	5–15–1		
Platteville State / Wisconsin–Platteville Pioneers (Wisconsin State University Conference) (1969–1973)
1969	Platteville State	8–1	7–1	T–1st	
1970	Platteville State	10–1	8–0	1st	L NAIA Division I Semifinal
1971	Wisconsin–Platteville	9–1	7–1	1st	
1972	Wisconsin–Platteville	6–4	4–4	T–4th	
1973	Wisconsin–Platteville	8–1–1	6–1–1	2nd	
Platteville State / Wisconsin–Platteville:		41–8–1	32–7–1		
Northern Michigan Wildcats (NCAA Division II independent) (1974–1977)
1974	Northern Michigan	0–10			
1975	Northern Michigan	13–1			W NCAA Division II Championship
1976	Northern Michigan	11–2			L NCAA Division II Semifinal
1977	Northern Michigan	7–3			L NCAA Division II First Round
Northern Michigan:		31–16			
New Mexico State Aggies (Missouri Valley Conference) (1978–1982)
1978	New Mexico State	6–5	5–1	1st	
1979	New Mexico State	2–9	1–4	T–4th	
1980	New Mexico State	3–7–1	1–4–1	6th	
1981	New Mexico State	3–8	1–5	7th	
1982	New Mexico State	3–8	1–4	T–6th	
New Mexico State:		17–37–1	10–18–1		
Wisconsin–Superior Yellowjackets (Wisconsin Intercollegiate Athletic Conference) (1984–1987)
1984	Wisconsin–Superior	0–11	0–8	9th	
1985	Wisconsin–Superior	2–8–1	1–6–1	9th	
1986	Wisconsin–Superior	0–10	0–8	9th	
1987	Wisconsin–Superior	3–7	2–6	8th	
Wisconsin–Superior:		5–36–1	3–28–1		
Total:		104–114–4			
National championship Conference title Conference division title or championship game berth
