= Tom Reed (American football) =

American football player and coach (1945–2022)

Biographical details
- Born: January 7, 1945
- Died: September 26, 2022 (aged 77); Zebulon, North Carolina, U.S.

Playing career
- 1964–1966: Miami (OH)
- Position: Halfback

Coaching career (HC unless noted)
- 1967–1968: Miami (OH) (GA)
- 1969–1972: Akron (DL)
- 1973: Arizona (DB)
- 1974–1977: Michigan (DL)
- 1978–1982: Miami (OH)
- 1983–1985: NC State
- 1987–1991: Michigan (DL)

Head coaching record
- Overall: 43–43–2

Tom Reed (January 7, 1945 – September 26, 2022) was an American college football player and coach. He served as the head football coach at Miami University from 1978 to 1982 and at North Carolina State University from 1983 to 1985, compiling a career head coaching record of 43–43–2.

== Early life and playing career ==
Reed studied at Miami University in Oxford, Ohio, graduating in 1967. There, he played two season for the Miami Redskins under Bo Schembechler. He recorded 38 and 34 rushing yards in 1964 and 1966, respectively.

== Coaching career ==
=== Assistant (1967–1977) ===
After graduating, Reed remained at his alma mater and took up his first coaching role as graduate assistant for the Redskins. He then became the defensive line coach for the Akron Zips from 1969 to 1972. After a brief stint as defensive back coach with the Arizona Wildcats, he went back to coaching defensive line with the Michigan Wolverines in 1974. He served for three seasons in that capacity, his final assistant role before becoming head coach.

=== Miami (1978–1982) ===
Reed served as the head coach at Miami University from 1978 to 1982, replacing Dick Crum who became the North Carolina Tar Heels coach. His best seasons came in 1978 (where he inherited 15 starters and 30 returning players) and 1981, when he led the Redskins to 8–2–1 records. Reed's squads orchestrated several big upset wins including a victory over North Carolina during the 1978 season and a victory over Kentucky in Lexington in 1979. Reed had four winning seasons in five years and tallied a career record of 34–19–2 at Miami. After the 1981 season, Reed accepted the head coaching position at NC State and was replaced by Tim Rose.

=== NC State (1983–1985) ===
Reed was appointed as head coach at North Carolina State University on December 22, 1982, succeeding Monte Kiffin who became linebacker coach for the Green Bay Packers. During his tenure with the Wolfpack, Reed raised the school's recruiting to a national level and ameliorated the team's academic standing within the institution. However, he never had a winning season in three years and compiled a record of 9–24 with the Wolfpack. He also feuded with Bruce Poulton – the university's chancellor at the time – over freshman athletic eligibility, as well as over the school administration's support for the team.

It was predicted that Reed would be dismissed at the conclusion of the 1985 season, despite having two years remaining on his contract. However, he pre-empted this by resigning suddenly on December 13, 1985, after losing to North Carolina in the final game of the regular season. He ultimately agreed to a financial settlement, and was succeeded by Dick Sheridan two weeks later. Reed subsequently went back to Michigan, serving as its defensive assistant from 1987 to 1991.

== Later life ==
After retiring from coaching, Reed returned to the Research Triangle and managed an executive-search consultant business that he established. He resided in that area until his death.

Reed died on September 26, 2022, at a retirement facility in Zebulon, North Carolina. He was 77 years old.

== Head coaching record ==
Year	Team	Overall	Conference	Standing	Bowl/playoffs
Miami Redskins (Mid-American Conference) (1978–1982)
1978	Miami	8–2–1	5–2	3rd	
1979	Miami	6–5	3–4	7th	
1980	Miami	5–6	4–3	T–3rd	
1981	Miami	8–2–1	6–1–1	2nd	
1982	Miami	7–4	5–3	3rd	
Miami:		34–19–2	23–13–1		
NC State Wolfpack (Atlantic Coast Conference) (1983–1985)
1983	NC State	3–8	1–6	T–7th	
1984	NC State	3–8	1–6	T–7th	
1985	NC State	3–8	2–5	T–6th	
NC State:		9–24	4–17		
Total:		43–43–2			
