= Larry Beightol =

American football player and coach (1942–2024)

Biographical details
- Born: November 21, 1942; Morrisdale, Pennsylvania, U.S.
- Died: April 4, 2024 (aged 81); Fayetteville, Arkansas, U.S.

Playing career
- 1961–1963: Catawba
- Positions: Guard, linebacker

Coaching career (HC unless noted)
- 1968–1971: William & Mary (OL)
- 1972–1975: NC State (OL)
- 1976: Auburn (OC/OL)
- 1977–1978: Arkansas (OL)
- 1979: Louisiana Tech
- 1981: Arkansas (OC)
- 1983–1984: Missouri (OC)
- 1985–1986: Atlanta Falcons (OL)
- 1987–1988: Tampa Bay Buccaneers (OL)
- 1989: San Diego Chargers (OL)
- 1990–1994: New York Jets (OL)
- 1995: Houston Oilers (OL)
- 1996–1998: Miami Dolphins (OL)
- 1999–2005: Green Bay Packers (OL)
- 2006: Detroit Lions (OL)

Administrative career (AD unless noted)
- 1979: Louisiana Tech

Head coaching record
- Overall: 2–8

Accomplishments and honors

Awards
- Pennsylvania Sports Hall of Fame; Catawba College Sports Hall of Fame

Larry Beightol (November 21, 1942 – April 4, 2024) was an American football coach. He has been inducted into both the Pennsylvania Sports Hall of Fame (Western Division) and the Catawba College Hall of Fame.

== Early years ==
Beightol played high school football at West Branch High School and college football at Catawba College. He obtained his master's degree at The College of William & Mary.

== Career ==
Beightol's coaching career began in 1968 at the College of William and Mary, where he served as offensive line coach until 1971. From there, Beightol moved on to coach at North Carolina State, Auburn, the University of Arkansas, the University of Missouri, and Louisiana Tech University, where he spent the 1979 season as head football coach. In 1985, Beightol began his National Football League (NFL) coaching career, where he led the offensive lines for the Atlanta Falcons, Tampa Bay Buccaneers, San Diego Chargers, New York Jets, Houston Oilers, and Miami Dolphins before joining the Green Bay Packers as offensive line coach in 1999 under head coach Ray Rhodes. When Mike Sherman became the Packers coach in 2000, Beightol was one of the few assistant coaches he retained from the previous coaching regime.

In early 2006, Sherman was fired by the Packers after a disappointing 4–12 season. The new head coach, Mike McCarthy, released much of the coaching staff after he was hired, including Beightol. He was hired in late January 2006 by the Detroit Lions and new head coach Rod Marinelli to coach the Lions' offensive line. In January 2007 he was fired from the Detroit Lions.

After his NFL career, Beightol served as an offensive line coach preparing college stars for the NFL combine, at Competitive Edge Sports (CES) of Atlanta. Beightol also ran a national football camps for high school stars in training.

== Death ==
Beightol died of complications from heart failure, dementia, and diabetes, in Fayetteville, Arkansas, on April 4, 2024. He was 81.

== Head coaching record ==
Year	Team	Overall	Conference	Standing	Bowl/playoffs
Louisiana Tech Bulldogs (Southland Conference) (1979)
1979	Louisiana Tech	2–8 (Note: Beightol was fired with one game remaining; Pat Patterson coached the finale.)	1–4	5th	
Louisiana Tech:		2–8	1–4		
Total:		2–8			
