= Dick Jamieson =

American football player and coach (1937–2001)

No. 15
- Position: Quarterback

Personal information
- Born: November 13, 1937; Streator, Illinois, U.S.
- Died: May 2, 2001 (aged 63); Kirkwood, Missouri, U.S.
- Listed height: 6 ft 1 in (1.85 m)
- Listed weight: 191 lb (87 kg)

Career information
- High school: Peoria (Peoria, Illinois)
- College: Bradley
- NFL draft: 1959: 25th round, 291st overall pick

Career history

Playing
- Football: Philadelphia Eagles (1959)*; New York Titans (1960–1961); Houston Oilers (1965)*; Baseball: Beaumont Pirates (1958); Grand Forks Chiefs (1958); San Angelo Pirates (1958)
- * Offseason or practice squad member only

Coaching
- Missouri (1972–1977) Offensive coordinator; Indiana State (1978–1979) Head coach; St. Louis Cardinals (1980–1984) Running backs coach; St. Louis Cardinals (1985) Offensive coordinator; Houston Oilers (1986–1987) Offensive coordinator; Northwestern (1990–1991) Assistant coach; Rutgers (1992–1994) Assistant coach; Philadelphia Eagles (1995–1996) Running backs coach; Arizona Cardinals (1997) Offensive coordinator

Awards and highlights
- Third-team Little All-American (1956)

Career AFL statistics
- Passing attempts: 70
- Passing completions: 35
- Completion percentage: 50.0%
- TD–INT: 6–2
- Passing yards: 586
- Passer rating: 95.3
- Stats at Pro Football Reference

Head coaching record
- Regular season: 11–11–0 (.500)
- Coaching profile at Pro Football Reference

Richard Alexander Jamieson (November 13, 1937 – May 2, 2001) was an American football and baseball player and coach of football. He was the offensive coordinator for the Arizona Cardinals of the National Football League (NFL) in 1997. He also served as offensive coordinator for the Cardinals in 1985 when the franchise was in St. Louis, Missouri.

== Playing career ==
Jamieson spent three seasons in professional football, 1959 with the NFL's Baltimore Colts and 1960 and 1961 in the American Football League, in which he was originally the property of the Dallas Texans but was traded to the New York Titans, now the New York Jets. He also spent two seasons in the farm system of Major League Baseball's Pittsburgh Pirates after graduating from Bradley University in 1959. He was a 'Little All-American' as a sophomore in 1956.

== Coaching career ==
Prior to joining the Cardinals staff, Jamieson was the head coach at Indiana State University from 1978 to 1979, leading the Sycamores to a record of 11–11.

Jamieson returned to Peoria and began a coaching career that took him from Peoria High, where his teams were renowned for their offensive prowess, to an assistant coaching position at the University of Missouri. He left there to become head coach at Indiana State, then was hired onto the staff of the NFL's Cardinals, for whom he would serve two stints as offensive coordinator, one in St. Louis and one in Arizona. Jamieson's career included time as an assistant coach for the NFL's Philadelphia Eagles and the Houston Oilers; he also served in the college ranks for Northwestern University, Rutgers University and Cerritos College.

== Personal life ==
Jamieson's father was Robert Arthur Jamieson, a Scottish emigrant who was a prominent citizen of Peoria, Illinois. His younger brother is Bob Jamieson, a longtime television news correspondent at NBC News and ABC News.

== Head coaching record ==
Year	Team	Overall	Conference	Standing	Bowl/playoffs
Indiana State Sycamores (Missouri Valley Conference) (1978–1979)
1978	Indiana State	3–8	2–3	5th	
1979	Indiana State	8–3	3–2	4th	
Indiana State:		11–11	5–5		
Total:		11–11			

== See also ==
- List of American Football League players
