= 1979 Dartmouth Big Green football team =

American college football season

1979 Dartmouth Big Green football
- Conference: Ivy League
- Record: 4–4–1 (4–3 Ivy)
- Head coach: Joe Yukica (2nd season)
- Home stadium: Memorial Field

1979 Ivy League football standings
	Conf.					Overall
Team	W		L		T	W		L		T
Yale $	6	–	1	–	0	8	–	1	–	0
Brown	5	–	2	–	0	6	–	3	–	0
Princeton	5	–	2	–	0	5	–	4	–	0
Cornell	4	–	3	–	0	5	–	4	–	0
Dartmouth	4	–	3	–	0	4	–	4	–	1
Harvard	3	–	4	–	0	3	–	6	–	0
Columbia	1	–	6	–	0	1	–	8	–	0
Penn	0	–	7	–	0	0	–	9	–	0
$ – Conference champion

The 1979 Dartmouth Big Green football team represented Dartmouth College in the 1979 NCAA Division I-A football season.

== Schedule ==
Date	Opponent	Site	Result	Attendance	Source
September 22	Princeton	Memorial Field; Hanover, NH	L 0–16	14,500	
September 29	at No. 8 New Hampshire*	Cowell Stadium; Durham, NH (rivalry)	T 10–10	13,500	
October 6	Holy Cross*	Memorial Field; Hanover, NH	L 7–13	10,700	
October 13	at Yale	Yale Bowl; New Haven, CT	L 0–3	26,000	
October 20	at Harvard	Harvard Stadium; Boston, MA (rivalry)	W 10–7	32,000	
October 27	Cornell	Memorial Field; Hanover, NH (rivalry)	L 10–21	10,600	
November 3	at Columbia	Baker Field; New York, NY	W 17–0	2,150	
November 10	Brown	Memorial Field; Hanover, NH	W 24–10	9,700	
November 17	at Penn	Franklin Field; Philadelphia, PA	W 20–6	10,397	
*Non-conference game; Rankings from AP Poll released prior to the game

== Roster ==
1979 Dartmouth Big Green football team roster
Players
Coaches
Offense

Pos.	#	Name	Class
QB	14	Jeff Kemp	Jr
WR	13	Dave Shula	Jr

Defense

Pos.	#	Name	Class

Special teams

Pos.	#	Name	Class

Head coach

- Joe Yukica

Coordinators/assistant coaches

Legend

- (C) Team captain
- (S) Suspended
- (I) Ineligible
- Injured
- Redshirt
