= 1979 New Mexico State Aggies football team =

American college football season

1979 New Mexico State Aggies football
- Conference: Missouri Valley Conference
- Record: 2–9 (1–4 MVC)
- Head coach: Gil Krueger (2nd season)
- Home stadium: Aggie Memorial Stadium

1979 Missouri Valley Conference football standings
	Conf.					Overall
Team	W		L		T	W		L		T
West Texas State $	5	–	0	–	0	5	–	5	–	1
Southern Illinois	4	–	1	–	0	8	–	3	–	0
Indiana State	3	–	2	–	0	8	–	3	–	0
Drake	1	–	4	–	0	3	–	8	–	0
New Mexico State	1	–	4	–	0	2	–	9	–	0
Wichita State	1	–	4	–	0	1	–	10	–	0
Tulsa	0	–	0	–	0	6	–	5	–	0
$ – Conference champion; Tulsa was ineligible for MVC title

The 1979 New Mexico State Aggies football team was an American football team that represented New Mexico State University in the Missouri Valley Conference during the 1979 NCAA Division I-A football season. In their second year under head coach Gil Krueger, the Aggies compiled a 2–9 record. The team played its home games at Aggie Memorial Stadium in Las Cruces, New Mexico.

== Schedule ==
Date	Opponent	Site	Result	Attendance	Source
September 1	Wichita State	Aggie Memorial Stadium; Las Cruces, NM	W 23–13	18,821	
September 8	at Drake	Drake Stadium; Des Moines, IA	L 13–14		
September 15	at UTEP*	Sun Bowl; El Paso, TX (rivalry)	W 14–13	30,132	
September 22	Indiana State	Aggie Memorial Stadium; Las Cruces, NM	L 23–40	18,175	
September 29	New Mexico*	Aggie Memorial Stadium; Las Cruces, NM (rivalry)	L 16–30	26,271	
October 6	at No. 5 Nebraska*	Memorial Stadium; Lincoln, NE	L 0–57	76,135	
October 13	at North Texas State*	Fouts Field; Denton, TX	L 7–21	13,011	
October 20	UT Arlington*	Aggie Memorial Stadium; Las Cruces, NM	L 14–42	15,224	
November 3	West Texas State	Aggie Memorial Stadium; Las Cruces, NM	L 21–54	12,202	
November 10	at Tulsa*	Skelly Stadium; Tulsa, OK	L 16–38	10,065	
November 17	at Southern Illinois	McAndrew Stadium; Carbondale, IL	L 28–45	8,700	
*Non-conference game; Rankings from AP Poll released prior to the game
