= 1979 Wichita State Shockers football team =

American college football season

1979 Wichita State Shockers football
- Conference: Missouri Valley Conference
- Record: 1–10 (1–4 MVC)
- Head coach: Willie Jeffries (1st season)
- Defensive coordinator: Ben Blacknall (1st season)
- Home stadium: Cessna Stadium

1979 Missouri Valley Conference football standings
| | Conf. | | | | | Overall |
| Team | W | | L | | T | W | | L | | T |
|---|---|---|---|---|---|---|---|---|---|---|
| West Texas State $ | 5 | – | 0 | – | 0 | 5 | – | 5 | – | 1 |
| Southern Illinois | 4 | – | 1 | – | 0 | 8 | – | 3 | – | 0 |
| Indiana State | 3 | – | 2 | – | 0 | 8 | – | 3 | – | 0 |
| Drake | 1 | – | 4 | – | 0 | 3 | – | 8 | – | 0 |
| New Mexico State | 1 | – | 4 | – | 0 | 2 | – | 9 | – | 0 |
| Wichita State | 1 | – | 4 | – | 0 | 1 | – | 10 | – | 0 |
| Tulsa | 0 | – | 0 | – | 0 | 6 | – | 5 | – | 0 |
$ – Conference champion; Tulsa was ineligible for MVC title

The 1979 Wichita State Shockers football team was an American football team that represented Wichita State as a member of the Missouri Valley Conference during the 1979 NCAA Division I-A football season. In their first year under head coach Willie Jeffries, the team compiled a 1–10 record.

== Schedule ==
| Date | Opponent | Site | Result | Attendance | Source |
|---|---|---|---|---|---|
| September 1 | at New Mexico State | Aggie Memorial Stadium; Las Cruces, NM | L 13–23 | 18,821 | |
| September 8 | Indiana State | Cessna Stadium; Wichita, KS | L 9–28 | 20,876 | |
| September 15 | at Oklahoma State* | Lewis Field; Stillwater, OK | L 6–16 | 42,000 | |
| September 22 | Memphis State* | Cessna Stadium; Wichita, KS | L 10–16 | 17,922 | |
| October 6 | at No. 2 Alabama* | Bryant–Denny Stadium; Tuscaloosa, AL | L 0–38 | 51,000 | |
| October 13 | at Southern Illinois | McAndrew Stadium; Carbondale, IL | L 7–31 | 12,300 | |
| October 20 | Drake | Cessna Stadium; Wichita, KS | W 24–17 | 10,020 | |
| October 27 | West Texas State | Cessna Stadium; Wichita, KS | L 0–58 | 9,127 | |
| November 3 | at Tulsa* | Skelly Stadium; Tulsa, OK | L 26–28 | 17,821 | |
| November 10 | SMU* | Cessna Stadium; Wichita, KS | L 0–34 | 6,110 | |
| November 17 | Long Beach State* | Cessna Stadium; Wichita, KS | L 10–16 | 5,917 | |
*Non-conference game; Rankings from AP Poll released prior to the game
