= 1979 Toledo Rockets football team =

American college football season

1979 Toledo Rockets football
- Conference: Mid-American Conference
- Record: 7–3–1 (7–1–1 MAC)
- Head coach: Chuck Stobart (3rd season)
- Home stadium: Glass Bowl

1979 Mid-American Conference football standings
	Conf.					Overall
Team	W		L		T	W		L		T
Central Michigan $	8	–	0	–	1	10	–	0	–	1
Toledo	7	–	1	–	1	7	–	3	–	1
Western Michigan	5	–	4	–	0	6	–	5	–	0
Ball State	4	–	4	–	0	6	–	5	–	0
Ohio	4	–	4	–	0	6	–	5	–	0
Northern Illinois	3	–	3	–	1	5	–	5	–	1
Miami (OH)	3	–	4	–	0	6	–	5	–	0
Bowling Green	3	–	5	–	0	4	–	7	–	0
Eastern Michigan	1	–	6	–	1	2	–	8	–	1
Kent State	1	–	8	–	0	1	–	10	–	0
$ – Conference champion

The 1979 Toledo Rockets football team was an American football team that represented the University of Toledo in the Mid-American Conference (MAC) during the 1979 NCAA Division I-A football season. In their third season under head coach Chuck Stobart, the Rockets compiled a 7–3–1 record (7–1–1 against MAC opponents), finished in second place in the MAC, and outscored all opponents by a combined total of 213 to 190.

The team's statistical leaders included Maurice Hall with 648 passing yards, Mike Alston with 806 rushing yards, and Butch Hunyadi with 500 receiving yards.

== Schedule ==
Date	Opponent	Site	Result	Attendance	Source
September 8	at Marshall*	Fairfield Stadium; Huntington, WV	L 14–31	17,200	
September 15	Ball State	Glass Bowl; Toledo, OH	W 31–14		
September 22	at Arizona State*	Sun Devil Stadium; Tempe, AZ	L 0–49	68,756	
September 29	at Eastern Michigan	Rynearson Stadium; Ypsilanti, MI	W 37–7		
October 6	at Bowling Green	Doyt Perry Stadium; Bowling Green, OH (rivalry)	W 23–17		
October 13	Western Michigan	Glass Bowl; Toledo, OH	W 17–0		
October 20	Ohio	Glass Bowl; Toledo, OH	W 21–13		
October 27	at Miami (OH)	Miami Field; Oxford, OH	W 24–21		
November 3	Central Michigan	Glass Bowl; Toledo, OH	T 7–7	25,570	
November 10	at Northern Illinois	Huskie Stadium; DeKalb, IL	L 10–28		
November 17	Kent State	Dix Stadium; Kent, OH	W 29–3	16,979	
*Non-conference game

== Roster ==
1979 Toledo Rockets football team roster
Players
Coaches
Offense

Pos.	#	Name	Class
RB	22	Willis Bell	So

Defense

Pos.	#	Name	Class
DB	26	Darryl Meadows	Fr
DB	46	Mike Kennedy	So

Special teams

Pos.	#	Name	Class

Head coach

- Chuck Stobart

Coordinators/assistant coaches

Legend

- (C) Team captain
- (S) Suspended
- (I) Ineligible
- Injured
- Redshirt
