= 1979 Harvard Crimson football team =

American college football season

1979 Harvard Crimson football
- Conference: Ivy League
- Record: 3–6 (3–4 Ivy)
- Head coach: Joe Restic (9th season)
- Captain: Michael G. Brown
- Home stadium: Harvard Stadium

1979 Ivy League football standings
	Conf.					Overall
Team	W		L		T	W		L		T
Yale $	6	–	1	–	0	8	–	1	–	0
Brown	5	–	2	–	0	6	–	3	–	0
Princeton	5	–	2	–	0	5	–	4	–	0
Cornell	4	–	3	–	0	5	–	4	–	0
Dartmouth	4	–	3	–	0	4	–	4	–	1
Harvard	3	–	4	–	0	3	–	6	–	0
Columbia	1	–	6	–	0	1	–	8	–	0
Penn	0	–	7	–	0	0	–	9	–	0
$ – Conference champion

The 1979 Harvard Crimson football team was an American football team that represented Harvard University during the 1979 NCAA Division I-A football season. Harvard finished sixth in the Ivy League.

In their ninth year under head coach Joe Restic, the Crimson compiled a 3–6 record and were outscored 157 to 148. Michael G. Brown was the team captain.

Harvard's 3–4 conference record placed sixth in the Ivy League standings. The Crimson outscored Ivy opponents 131 to 123.

Harvard played its home games at Harvard Stadium in the Allston neighborhood of Boston, Massachusetts.

== Schedule ==
Date	Opponent	Site	Result	Attendance	Source
September 22	at Columbia	Baker Field; New York, NY	W 26–7	4,525	
September 29	UMass*	Harvard Stadium; Boston, MA	L 7–20	15,000	
October 6	No. T–3 Boston University*	Harvard Stadium; Boston, MA	L 10–14	12,500	
October 13	at Cornell	Schoellkopf Field; Ithaca, NY	L 14–41	9,000	
October 20	Dartmouth	Harvard Stadium; Boston, MA (rivalry)	L 7–10	32,000	
October 27	Princeton	Harvard Stadium; Boston, MA (rivalry)	L 7–9	15,000	
November 3	at Brown	Brown Stadium; Providence, RI	L 14–23	8,760	
November 10	Penn	Harvard Stadium; Boston, MA (rivalry)	W 41–26	7,500	
November 17	at Yale	Yale Bowl; New Haven, CT (The Game)	W 22–7	72,000	
*Non-conference game; Rankings from AP Poll released prior to the game
