= 1979 Kent State Golden Flashes football team =

American college football season

1979 Kent State Golden Flashes football
- Conference: Mid-American Conference
- Record: 1–10 (1–8 MAC)
- Head coach: Ron Blackledge (2nd season)
- Home stadium: Dix Stadium

1979 Mid-American Conference football standings
	Conf.					Overall
Team	W		L		T	W		L		T
Central Michigan $	8	–	0	–	1	10	–	0	–	1
Toledo	7	–	1	–	1	7	–	3	–	1
Western Michigan	5	–	4	–	0	6	–	5	–	0
Ball State	4	–	4	–	0	6	–	5	–	0
Ohio	4	–	4	–	0	6	–	5	–	0
Northern Illinois	3	–	3	–	1	5	–	5	–	1
Miami (OH)	3	–	4	–	0	6	–	5	–	0
Bowling Green	3	–	5	–	0	4	–	7	–	0
Eastern Michigan	1	–	6	–	1	2	–	8	–	1
Kent State	1	–	8	–	0	1	–	10	–	0
$ – Conference champion

The 1979 Kent State Golden Flashes football team was an American football team that represented Kent State University in the Mid-American Conference (MAC) during the 1979 NCAA Division I-A football season. In their second season under head coach Ron Blackledge, the Golden Flashes compiled a 1–10 record (1–8 against MAC opponents), finished in tenth place in the MAC, and were outscored by all opponents by a combined total of 298 to 127.

The team's statistical leaders included J.C. Stafford with 497 rushing yards, Jeff Morrow with 1,284 passing yards, and Mike Moore with 334 receiving yards. Punter Jeff Morrow was selected as a first-team All-MAC player.

== Schedule ==
Date	Opponent	Site	Result	Attendance	Source
September 8	Eastern Kentucky*	Dix Stadium; Kent, OH	L 14–17	11,045	
September 15	at Akron*	Rubber Bowl; Akron, OH (Wagon Wheel)	L 13–15	21,645	
September 22	Ball State	Dix Stadium; Kent, OH	L 10–35	4,000	
September 29	at Ohio	Peden Stadium; Athens, OH	L 13–43		
October 6	at Western Michigan	Waldo Stadium; Kalamazoo, MI	W 18–13		
October 13	Bowling Green	Dix Stadium; Kent, OH (rivalry)	L 17–28		
October 20	at Eastern Michigan	Rynearson Stadium; Ypsilanti, MI	L 10–14		
October 27	Central Michigan	Dix Stadium; Kent, OH	L 21–44	3,500	
November 3	at Northern Illinois	Huskie Stadium; DeKalb, IL	L 0–25	15,365	
November 10	Miami (OH)	Dix Stadium; Kent, OH	L 8–35		
November 17	at Toledo	Glass Bowl; Toledo, OH	L 3–29	16,879	
*Non-conference game
