= 1979 Ohio Bobcats football team =

American college football season

1979 Ohio Bobcats football
- Conference: Mid-American Conference
- Record: 6–5 (4–4 MAC)
- Head coach: Brian Burke (1st season)
- Home stadium: Peden Stadium

1979 Mid-American Conference football standings
	Conf.					Overall
Team	W		L		T	W		L		T
Central Michigan $	8	–	0	–	1	10	–	0	–	1
Toledo	7	–	1	–	1	7	–	3	–	1
Western Michigan	5	–	4	–	0	6	–	5	–	0
Ball State	4	–	4	–	0	6	–	5	–	0
Ohio	4	–	4	–	0	6	–	5	–	0
Northern Illinois	3	–	3	–	1	5	–	5	–	1
Miami (OH)	3	–	4	–	0	6	–	5	–	0
Bowling Green	3	–	5	–	0	4	–	7	–	0
Eastern Michigan	1	–	6	–	1	2	–	8	–	1
Kent State	1	–	8	–	0	1	–	10	–	0
$ – Conference champion

The 1979 Ohio Bobcats football team was an American football team that represented Ohio University in the Mid-American Conference (MAC) during the 1979 NCAA Division I-A football season. In their first season under head coach Brian Burke, the Bobcats compiled a 6–5 record (4–4 against MAC opponents), finished in a tie for fourth place in the MAC, and outscored all opponents by a combined total of 238 to 174. They played their home games in Peden Stadium in Athens, Ohio.

== Schedule ==
Date	Opponent	Site	Result	Attendance	Source
September 8	at Minnesota*	Memorial Stadium; Minneapolis, MN	L 10–24	33,435	
September 15	Eastern Michigan	Peden Stadium; Athens, OH	W 20–7		
September 22	Marshall*	Peden Stadium; Athens, OH (rivalry)	W 35–0		
September 29	Kent State	Peden Stadium; Athens, OH	W 43–13		
October 6	at Central Michigan	Perry Shorts Stadium; Mount Pleasant, MI	L 0–26		
October 13	at Miami (OH)	Miami Field; Oxford, OH (rivalry)	W 9–7	19,674	
October 20	at Toledo	Glass Bowl; Toledo, OH	L 13–21		
October 27	Western Michigan	Peden Stadium; Athens, OH	L 6–20		
November 10	at Cincinnati*	Nippert Stadium; Cincinnati, OH	W 27–7	9,916	
November 17	Bowling Green	Peden Stadium; Athens, OH	W 48–21		
November 24	at Northern Illinois	Huskie Stadium; DeKalb, IL	L 27–28	2,709	
*Non-conference game
