= 1979 Indiana State Sycamores football team =

American college football season

1979 Indiana State Sycamores football
- Conference: Missouri Valley Conference
- Record: 8–3 (3–2 MVC)
- Head coach: Dick Jamieson (2nd season)
- Offensive coordinator: Dick Jamieson
- Defensive coordinator: Dennis Raetz (2nd season)
- Home stadium: Memorial Stadium

1979 Missouri Valley Conference football standings
	Conf.					Overall
Team	W		L		T	W		L		T
West Texas State $	5	–	0	–	0	5	–	5	–	1
Southern Illinois	4	–	1	–	0	8	–	3	–	0
Indiana State	3	–	2	–	0	8	–	3	–	0
Drake	1	–	4	–	0	3	–	8	–	0
New Mexico State	1	–	4	–	0	2	–	9	–	0
Wichita State	1	–	4	–	0	1	–	10	–	0
Tulsa	0	–	0	–	0	6	–	5	–	0
$ – Conference champion; Tulsa was ineligible for MVC title

The 1979 Indiana State Sycamores football team represented Indiana State University as a member of the Missouri Valley Conference (MVC) during the 1979 NCAA Division I-A football season. Led by second-year head coach Dick Jamieson, the Sycamores compiled an overall record of 8–3 with a mark of 3–2 in conference play, placing third in the MVC. Indiana State played home games at Memorial Stadium.

The roster included such standout performers as: quarterback Reggie Allen, the 1979 MVC Offensive MVP; defensive end Gerry Glusic, the 1979 MVC Defensive MVP; defensive back Alvin Reynolds; linebacker Craig Shaffer, the 1981 MVC Defensive MVP; and offensive lineman Tunch Ilkin. Allen and Ilkin went on to careers in the National Football League (NFL), Reynolds as an assistant coach and Ilkin as a Pro Bowl-lineman for the Pittsburgh Steelers. Shaffer spent three seasons with the St. Louis Cardinals Glusic was named to the AP All-American Team. Six Sycamores would be named to the All-MVC Team: Allen, wide receivers Kirk Wilson and Eddie Ruffin, lineman George DeTella, Glusic, and defensive back John Allman. Allen, Glusic and Ilkin have been inducted into the Indiana State University Athletics Hall of Fame.

== Schedule ==
Date	Time	Opponent	Site	Result	Attendance	Source
September 1	7:30 p.m.	Drake	Memorial Stadium; Terre Haute, IN	W 19-12	5,500	
September 8	8:30 p.m.	at Wichita State	Cessna Stadium; Wichita, KS	W 28–9	20,876	
September 15	8:30 p.m.	at Western Illinois*	Hanson Field; Macomb, IL	W 17–14	7,549	
September 22	9:30 p.m.	at New Mexico State	Aggie Memorial Stadium; Las Cruces, NM	W 40–23	18,175	
September 29	7:30 p.m.	at Akron*	Rubber Bowl; Akron, OH	W 28–27	11,684	
October 6	7:30 p.m.	Ball State*	Memorial Stadium; Terre Haute, IN (rivalry)	W 18–13	11,278	
October 13	8:30 p.m.	at West Texas State	Kimbrough Memorial Stadium; Canyon, TX	L 17–33	15,766	
October 20	1:30 p.m.	Louisville*^{†}	Memorial Stadium; Terre Haute, IN	L 10–34	16,279	
October 27	1:30 p.m.	Illinois State*	Memorial Stadium; Terre Haute, IN	W 23–21	14,117	
November 3	2:30 p.m.	at Southern Illinois	McAndrew Stadium; Carbondale, IL	L 38–41	9,100	
November 10	1:30 p.m.	Northeast Louisiana*	Memorial Stadium; Terre Haute, IN	W 38–21	5,500	
*Non-conference game; ^{†}Homecoming; All times are in Eastern time
