= 1979 Southern Illinois Salukis football team =

American college football season

1979 Southern Illinois Salukis football
- Conference: Missouri Valley Conference
- Record: 8–3 (4–1 MVC)
- Head coach: Rey Dempsey (4th season)
- Home stadium: McAndrew Stadium

1979 Missouri Valley Conference football standings
| | Conf. | | | | | Overall |
| Team | W | | L | | T | W | | L | | T |
|---|---|---|---|---|---|---|---|---|---|---|
| West Texas State $ | 5 | – | 0 | – | 0 | 5 | – | 5 | – | 1 |
| Southern Illinois | 4 | – | 1 | – | 0 | 8 | – | 3 | – | 0 |
| Indiana State | 3 | – | 2 | – | 0 | 8 | – | 3 | – | 0 |
| Drake | 1 | – | 4 | – | 0 | 3 | – | 8 | – | 0 |
| New Mexico State | 1 | – | 4 | – | 0 | 2 | – | 9 | – | 0 |
| Wichita State | 1 | – | 4 | – | 0 | 1 | – | 10 | – | 0 |
| Tulsa | 0 | – | 0 | – | 0 | 6 | – | 5 | – | 0 |
$ – Conference champion; Tulsa was ineligible for MVC title

The 1979 Southern Illinois Salukis football team was an American football team that represented Southern Illinois University (now known as Southern Illinois University Carbondale) in the Missouri Valley Conference (MVC) during the 1979 NCAA Division I-A football season. Under fourth-year head coach Rey Dempsey, the team compiled an 8–3 record. The team played its home games at McAndrew Stadium in Carbondale, Illinois.

== Schedule ==
| Date | Opponent | Site | Result | Attendance | Source |
|---|---|---|---|---|---|
| September 1 | at West Texas State | Kimbrough Memorial Stadium; Canyon, TX | L 0–14 | 12,300 | |
| September 8 | Southwestern Louisiana* | McAndrew Stadium; Carbondale, IL | W 17–7 | 13,388 | |
| September 15 | at Tennessee State* | Hale Stadium; Nashville, TN | W 18–16 | 16,012 | |
| September 22 | at Arkansas State* | Indian Stadium; Jonesboro, AR | L 16–24 | 16,803 | |
| September 29 | Eastern Illinois* | McAndrew Stadium; Carbondale, IL | L 14–22 | 17,769 | |
| October 6 | Illinois State* | McAndrew Stadium; Carbondale, IL | W 7–0 | 8,100 | |
| October 20 | Wichita State | McAndrew Stadium; Carbondale, IL | W 31–7 | 12,300 | |
| October 27 | at Northern Illinois* | Huskie Stadium; DeKalb, IL | W 21–11 | 23,740 | |
| November 3 | Indiana State | McAndrew Stadium; Carbondale, IL | W 41–38 | 9,100 | |
| November 10 | at Drake | Drake Stadium; Des Moines, IA | W 22–21 | 5,070 | |
| November 17 | New Mexico State | McAndrew Stadium; Carbondale, IL | W 45–28 | 8,700 | |
*Non-conference game
