= 1979 Colgate Red Raiders football team =

American college football season

1979 Colgate Red Raiders football
- Conference: Independent
- Record: 5–4–1
- Head coach: Frederick Dunlap (4th season)
- Captains: Angelo Colosimo; John Marzo
- Home stadium: Andy Kerr Stadium

1979 NCAA Division I-A independents football records
	Conf.					Overall
Team	W		L		T	W		L		T
No. 6 Florida State		–		–		11	–	1	–	0
No. 7 Pittsburgh		–		–		11	–	1	–	0
UNLV		–		–		9	–	1	–	2
No. 17 Temple		–		–		10	–	2	–	0
Tulane		–		–		9	–	3	–	0
Rutgers		–		–		8	–	3	–	0
Tennessee State		–		–		8	–	3	–	0
East Carolina		–		–		7	–	3	–	1
No. 20 Penn State		–		–		8	–	4	–	0
South Carolina		–		–		8	–	4	–	0
Navy		–		–		7	–	4	–	0
Notre Dame		–		–		7	–	4	–	0
Southern Miss		–		–		6	–	4	–	1
Syracuse		–		–		7	–	5	–	0
Colgate		–		–		5	–	4	–	1
Boston College		–		–		5	–	6	–	0
Holy Cross		–		–		5	–	6	–	0
Memphis State		–		–		5	–	6	–	0
Miami (FL)		–		–		5	–	6	–	0
North Texas State		–		–		5	–	6	–	0
Villanova		–		–		5	–	6	–	0
Virginia Tech		–		–		5	–	6	–	0
West Virginia		–		–		5	–	6	–	0
Georgia Tech		–		–		4	–	6	–	1
Louisville		–		–		4	–	6	–	1
William & Mary		–		–		4	–	7	–	0
Illinois State		–		–		3	–	8	–	0
Northeast Louisiana		–		–		3	–	8	–	0
Army		–		–		2	–	8	–	1
Air Force		–		–		2	–	9	–	0
Cincinnati		–		–		2	–	9	–	0
Richmond		–		–		0	–	11	–	0
Rankings from AP Poll

The 1979 Colgate Red Raiders football team was an American football team that represented Colgate University as an independent during the 1979 NCAA Division I-A football season. In its fourth season under head coach Frederick Dunlap, the team compiled a 5–4–1 record. Angelo Colosimo and John Marzo were the team captains.

The team played its home games at Andy Kerr Stadium in Hamilton, New York.

== Schedule ==
Date	Opponent	Site	Result	Attendance	Source
September 15	at William & Mary	Cary Field; Williamsburg, VA	L 15–28	10,000	
September 22	No. 9 Lehigh	Andy Kerr Stadium; Hamilton, NY	W 10–3	7,200	
September 29	at Cornell	Schoellkopf Field; Ithaca, NY (rivalry)	L 21–36	12,000	
October 6	at Yale	Yale Bowl; New Haven, CT	L 0–27	18,500	
October 13	at Holy Cross	Fitton Field; Worcester, MA	W 17–16	12,241	
October 20	at Princeton	Palmer Stadium; Princeton, NJ	W 17–6	12,687	
October 27	at Columbia	Baker Field; New York, NY	W 24–14	5,025	
November 3	at Lafayette	Fisher Field; Easton, PA	T 7–7	6,000	
November 10	Bucknell	Andy Kerr Stadium; Hamilton, NY	W 20–2	5,000	
November 17	No. 1 (D-II) Delaware	Andy Kerr Stadium; Hamilton, NY	L 16–24	5,000	
Rankings from AP Poll released prior to the game

== Leading players ==
Two trophies were awarded to the Red Raiders' most valuable players in 1979:

- John Marzo, quarterback, received the Andy Kerr Trophy, awarded to the most valuable offensive player.
- Karl Grabowski, linebacker, received the Hal W. Lahar Trophy, awarded to the most valuable defensive player.

Statistical leaders for the 1979 Red Raiders included:

- Rushing: Angelo Colosimo, 557 yards and 3 touchdowns on 153 attempts
- Passing: John Marzo, 845 yards, 71 completions and 8 touchdowns on 133 attempts
- Receiving: Frank Rossi, 282 yards and 1 touchdowns on 26 receptions
- Total offense: John Marzo, 1,005 yards (845 passing, 160 rushing)
- Scoring: Angelo Colosimo, 36 points from 6 touchdowns
- All-purpose yards: Jim Freeman, 868 yards (309 kickoff returning, 283 receiving, 276 rushing)
- Tackles: Joe Murphy, 146 total tackles
- Sacks: Jeff King, 14 quarterback sacks
