= 1979 Miami Redskins football team =

American college football season

1979 Miami Redskins football
- Conference: Mid-American Conference
- Record: 6–5 (3–4 MAC)
- Head coach: Tom Reed (2nd season)
- Defensive coordinator: Tim Rose (2nd season)
- Home stadium: Miami Field

1979 Mid-American Conference football standings
	Conf.					Overall
Team	W		L		T	W		L		T
Central Michigan $	8	–	0	–	1	10	–	0	–	1
Toledo	7	–	1	–	1	7	–	3	–	1
Western Michigan	5	–	4	–	0	6	–	5	–	0
Ball State	4	–	4	–	0	6	–	5	–	0
Ohio	4	–	4	–	0	6	–	5	–	0
Northern Illinois	3	–	3	–	1	5	–	5	–	1
Miami (OH)	3	–	4	–	0	6	–	5	–	0
Bowling Green	3	–	5	–	0	4	–	7	–	0
Eastern Michigan	1	–	6	–	1	2	–	8	–	1
Kent State	1	–	8	–	0	1	–	10	–	0
$ – Conference champion

The 1979 Miami Redskins football team was an American football team that represented Miami University in the Mid-American Conference (MAC) during the 1979 NCAA Division I-A football season. In its second season under head coach Tom Reed, the team compiled a 6–5 record (3–4 against MAC opponents), finished in seventh place in the MAC, and outscored all opponents by a combined total of 223 to 142.

The team's statistical leaders included Chuck Hauck with 1,258 passing yards, Paul Drennan with 503 rushing yards, and Don Treadwell with 395 receiving yards.

== Schedule ==
Date	Opponent	Site	Result	Attendance	Source
September 8	Ball State	Miami Field; Oxford, OH	W 27–3	16,438	
September 15	at Kentucky*	Commonwealth Stadium; Lexington, KY	W 15–14	57,800	
September 22	at No. 8 Michigan State*	Spartan Stadium; East Lansing, MI	L 21–24	78,582	
September 29	at Central Michigan	Kelly Shorts Stadium; Mount Pleasant, MI	L 18–19	24,348	
October 6	at Marshall*	Fairfield Stadium; Huntington, WV	W 28–0		
October 13	Ohio	Miami Field; Oxford, OH (rivalry)	L 7–9	19,674	
October 20	at Bowling Green	Doyt Perry Stadium; Bowling Green, OH	W 21–3		
October 27	Toledo	Miami Field; Oxford, OH	L 21–24		
November 3	at Western Michigan	Waldo Stadium; Kalamazoo, MI	L 3–24		
November 10	at Kent State	Dix Stadium; Kent, OH	W 35–8		
November 17	Cincinnati*	Miami Field; Oxford, OH (rivalry)	W 27–14	12,060	
*Non-conference game; Rankings from AP Poll released prior to the game

== Roster ==
1979 Miami Redskins football team roster
Players
Coaches
Offense

Pos.	#	Name	Class
FB	35	John Cornerty	Sr
QB	15	Jim Finley	Fr
QB	3	Mark Kelly	So
C	68	Doug Lantz	Sr
QB	2	Pat Moore	Fr

Defense

Pos.	#	Name	Class
DT	63	John Anderson	Sr
DB	22	Tim Dillon	Sr
DB	16	Alvin Hall	Sr
DB	9	Kirk Springs	Sr
LB	88	Dan Williams	Jr
DB	38	David Williams	Fr
LB	53	Joe Wolf	Jr

Special teams

Pos.	#	Name	Class
K	4	Blaine Owens	Fr

Head coach

- Tom Reed

Coordinators/assistant coaches

Legend

- (C) Team captain
- (S) Suspended
- (I) Ineligible
- Injured
- Redshirt
