= 1979 Yale Bulldogs football team =

American college football season

1979 Yale Bulldogs football

Ivy League champion
- Conference: Ivy League
- Record: 8–1 (6–1 Ivy)
- Head coach: Carmen Cozza (15th season)
- Home stadium: Yale Bowl

1979 Ivy League football standings
	Conf.					Overall
Team	W		L		T	W		L		T
Yale $	6	–	1	–	0	8	–	1	–	0
Brown	5	–	2	–	0	6	–	3	–	0
Princeton	5	–	2	–	0	5	–	4	–	0
Cornell	4	–	3	–	0	5	–	4	–	0
Dartmouth	4	–	3	–	0	4	–	4	–	1
Harvard	3	–	4	–	0	3	–	6	–	0
Columbia	1	–	6	–	0	1	–	8	–	0
Penn	0	–	7	–	0	0	–	9	–	0
$ – Conference champion

The 1979 Yale Bulldogs football team represented Yale University in the 1979 NCAA Division I-A football season. The Bulldogs were led by 15th-year head coach Carmen Cozza, played their home games at the Yale Bowl and finished in first place in the Ivy League with a 6–1 record, 8–1 overall.

== Schedule ==
Date	Opponent	Site	Result	Attendance	Source
September 22	Brown	Yale Bowl; New Haven, CT	W 13–12	15,000	
September 29	Connecticut*	Yale Bowl; New Haven, CT	W 24–17	21,300	
October 6	Colgate*	Yale Bowl; New Haven, CT	W 27–0	18,500	
October 13	Dartmouth	Yale Bowl; New Haven, CT	W 3–0	26,000	
October 20	at Columbia	Baker Field; New York, NY	W 37–7	7,350	
October 27	Penn	Yale Bowl; New Haven, CT	W 24–6	19,852	
November 3	at Cornell	Schoellkopf Field; Ithaca, NY	W 23–20	18,500	
November 10	at Princeton	Palmer Stadium; Princeton, NJ (rivalry)	W 35–10	22,825	
November 17	Harvard	Yale Bowl; New Haven, CT (The Game)	L 7–22	72,000	
*Non-conference game

== Roster ==
1979 Yale Bulldogs football team roster
Players
Coaches
Offense

Pos.	#	Name	Class
TE	95	Dale Bernhard	Jr
OT	79	Jim Britt	So
WR	88	Bob Burkitt	So
QB	12	David Daugherty	So
RB	7	Rich Diana	So
QB	6	Dennis Dunn	Sr
RB	42	Kenny Hill	Sr
C	56	Jeff Manning	Jr
RB	20	Cornell McCullom	Jr
RB	41	John Nitti	Jr
QB	19	John Rogan	So
OT	70	Dan Skarzynski	Jr
G	76	Tim Spears	Sr
WR	87	Dan Stratton	Jr
FB	28	Mike Sullivan	Sr
G	58	Bill Whitehurst	Jr

Defense

Pos.	#	Name	Class
LB	21	Danny Barnett	Jr
QB	13	Blake Bennett	Sr
DB	14	Kerry Bensinger	So
DT	71	David Conrad	Sr
DB	49	Pat Conran	So
DE	86	Tim Dwyer	Sr
DT	97	John Ford	Jr
DB	23	Chip Kelly	Sr
DE	99	John Kelly	Jr
DT	89	Bill Kirk	Sr
DT	83	Bill Mattick	Jr
LB	37	Scott McKenzie	Jr
S	8	Mike Muscatello	Jr

Special teams

Pos.	#	Name	Class
K	3	Tony Jones	So

Head coach

- Carmen Cozza

Coordinators/assistant coaches

Legend

- (C) Team captain
- (S) Suspended
- (I) Ineligible
- Injured
- Redshirt

== NFL draft ==
The following Bulldog was selected in the National Football League draft following the season.

Round	Pick	Player	Position	NFL team
9	194	Kenny Hill	DB	Oakland Raiders
