= 1979 Bowling Green Falcons football team =

American college football season

1979 Bowling Green Falcons football
- Conference: Mid-American Conference
- Record: 4–7 (3–5 MAC)
- Head coach: Denny Stolz (3rd season)
- Offensive coordinator: Mike Rasmussen (3rd season)
- Home stadium: Doyt Perry Stadium

1979 Mid-American Conference football standings
	Conf.					Overall
Team	W		L		T	W		L		T
Central Michigan $	8	–	0	–	1	10	–	0	–	1
Toledo	7	–	1	–	1	7	–	3	–	1
Western Michigan	5	–	4	–	0	6	–	5	–	0
Ball State	4	–	4	–	0	6	–	5	–	0
Ohio	4	–	4	–	0	6	–	5	–	0
Northern Illinois	3	–	3	–	1	5	–	5	–	1
Miami (OH)	3	–	4	–	0	6	–	5	–	0
Bowling Green	3	–	5	–	0	4	–	7	–	0
Eastern Michigan	1	–	6	–	1	2	–	8	–	1
Kent State	1	–	8	–	0	1	–	10	–	0
$ – Conference champion

The 1979 Bowling Green Falcons football team was an American football team that represented Bowling Green University in the Mid-American Conference (MAC) during the 1979 NCAA Division I-A football season. In their third season under head coach Denny Stolz, the Falcons compiled a 4–7 record (3–5 against MAC opponents), finished in eighth place in the MAC, and were outscored by their opponents by a combined total of 265 to 194.

The team's statistical leaders included Mike Wright with 1,148 passing yards, Kevin Folkes with 696 rushing yards, and Dan Shetler with 502 receiving yards.

== Schedule ==
Date	Opponent	Site	Result	Attendance	Source
September 8	Eastern Michigan	Doyt Perry Stadium; Bowling Green, OH	W 32–6		
September 15	at Iowa State*	Cyclone Stadium; Ames, IA	L 10–38	47,300	
September 22	Central Michigan	Doyt Perry Stadium; Bowling Green, OH	L 0–24		
September 29	at Western Michigan	Waldo Stadium; Kalamazoo, MI	W 15–3		
October 6	Toledo	Doyt Perry Stadium; Bowling Green, OH (rivalry)	L 17–23		
October 13	at Kent State	Dix Stadium; Kent, OH (rivalry)	W 28–17		
October 20	Miami (OH)	Doyt Perry Stadium; Bowling Green, OH	L 3–21		
October 27	at Ball State	Ball State Stadium; Muncie, IN	L 23–38	15,736	
November 3	at Kentucky*	Commonwealth Stadium; Lexington, KY	L 14–20	57,500	
November 10	Southern Miss*	Doyt Perry Stadium; Bowling Green, OH	W 31–27	10,556	
November 17	at Ohio	Peden Stadium; Athens, OH	L 21–48		
*Non-conference game

== Roster ==
1979 Bowling Green Falcons football team roster
Players			Coaches
Offense: Pos. / # / Name / Class	Defense: Pos. / # / Name / Class; DE / 90 / Tim Ross / Jr	Special teams: Pos. / # / Name / Class	Head coach: Denny Stolz; Coordinators/assistant coaches: Kit Cartwright (DB); Legend: (C) Team captain; (S) Suspended; (I) Ineligible; Injured; Redshirt
