= 1979 McNeese State Cowboys football team =

American college football season

1979 McNeese State Cowboys football

Southland champion

Independence Bowl, L 7–31 vs. Syracuse
- Conference: Southland Conference
- Record: 11–1 (5–0 Southland)
- Head coach: Ernie Duplechin (1st season)
- Defensive coordinator: Hubert Boales (1st season)
- Home stadium: Cowboy Stadium

1979 Southland Conference football standings
	Conf.					Overall
Team	W		L		T	W		L		T
McNeese State $	5	–	0	–	0	11	–	1	–	0
UT Arlington	4	–	1	–	0	9	–	2	–	0
Lamar	3	–	2	–	0	6	–	3	–	2
Arkansas State	1	–	4	–	0	4	–	7	–	0
Southwestern Louisiana	1	–	4	–	0	4	–	7	–	0
Louisiana Tech	1	–	4	–	0	2	–	9	–	0
$ – Conference champion; Louisiana Tech record includes one win by forfeit.

The 1979 McNeese State Cowboys football team represented McNeese State University as a member of the Southland Conference during the 1979 NCAA Division I-A football season. Led by first-year head coach Ernie Duplechin, the Cowboys compiled an overall record of 11–1 with a mark of 5–0 in conference play, winning the Southland title. McNeese State was invited to the Independence Bowl, where they lost to Syracuse.

== Schedule ==
Date	Opponent	Site	Result	Attendance	Source
September 1	at Tulsa*	Skelly Field; Tulsa, OK	W 6–3	24,600	
September 8	Southeastern Louisiana*	Cowboy Stadium; Lake Charles, LA	W 10–7		
September 15	West Texas State*	Cowboy Stadium; Lake Charles, LA	W 21–0	19,500	
September 22	Northeast Louisiana*	Cowboy Stadium; Lake Charles, LA	W 12–10	19,860	
October 6	at UT Arlington	Cravens Field; Arlington, TX	W 14–13	9,303	
October 13	at Lamar	Cardinal Stadium; Beaumont, TX (rivalry)	W 34–25		
October 20	Arkansas State	Cowboy Stadium; Lake Charles, LA	W 10–7		
October 27	at Chattanooga*	Chamberlain Field; Chattanooga, TN	W 24–17		
November 3	Northwestern State*	Cowboy Stadium; Lake Charles, LA (rivalry)	W 44–13	19,875	
November 10	Louisiana Tech	Cowboy Stadium; Lake Charles, LA	W 41–7	19,375	
November 17	at Southwestern Louisiana	Cajun Field; Lafayette, LA (rivalry)	W 10–6		
December 15	vs. Syracuse*	State Fair Stadium; Shreveport, LA (Independence Bowl)	L 7–31	27,234	
*Non-conference game
