= 1979 Central Michigan Chippewas football team =

American college football season

1979 Central Michigan Chippewas football

MAC champion
- Conference: Mid-American Conference
- Record: 10–0–1 (8–0–1 MAC)
- Head coach: Herb Deromedi (2nd season)
- MVP: Gary Hogeboom
- Home stadium: Perry Shorts Stadium

1979 Mid-American Conference football standings
	Conf.					Overall
Team	W		L		T	W		L		T
Central Michigan $	8	–	0	–	1	10	–	0	–	1
Toledo	7	–	1	–	1	7	–	3	–	1
Western Michigan	5	–	4	–	0	6	–	5	–	0
Ball State	4	–	4	–	0	6	–	5	–	0
Ohio	4	–	4	–	0	6	–	5	–	0
Northern Illinois	3	–	3	–	1	5	–	5	–	1
Miami (OH)	3	–	4	–	0	6	–	5	–	0
Bowling Green	3	–	5	–	0	4	–	7	–	0
Eastern Michigan	1	–	6	–	1	2	–	8	–	1
Kent State	1	–	8	–	0	1	–	10	–	0
$ – Conference champion

The 1979 Central Michigan Chippewas football team was an American football team that represented Central Michigan University during the 1979 NCAA Division I-A football season. In their second season under head coach Herb Deromedi, the Chippewas compiled a 10–0–1 record, won the Mid-American Conference championship, and outscored all opponents by a combined total of 291 to 133. The team played its home games in Perry Shorts Stadium in Mount Pleasant, Michigan, with attendance of 101,705 in five home games.

The team's statistical leaders were Gary Hogeboom with 1,404 passing yards, Willie Todd with 1,003 rushing yards, and Mike Ball with 457 receiving yards. Hogeboom was selected as the team's most valuable player and as the MAC Offensive Player of the Year. Seven Central Michigan players (OT Marty Smallbone, WR Mike Ball, RB Willie Todd, QB Gary Hogeboom, DT Bill White, DB Robert Jackson, and LB Tim Hollandsworth) received first-team All-MAC honors.

== Schedule ==
Date	Opponent	Site	Result	Attendance	Source
September 8	Western Michigan	Perry Shorts Stadium; Mount Pleasant, MI (rivalry)	W 10–0	21,980	
September 22	at Bowling Green	Doyt Perry Stadium; Bowling Green, OH	W 24–0		
September 29	Miami (OH)	Perry Shorts Stadium; Mount Pleasant, MI	W 19–18	24,348	
October 6	Ohio	Perry Shorts Stadium; Mount Pleasant, MI	W 26–0		
October 13	Northern Illinois	Perry Shorts Stadium; Mount Pleasant, MI	W 31–11	20,327	
October 20	at Ball State	Ball State Stadium; Muncie, IN	W 31–30	12,713	
October 27	at Kent State	Dix Stadium; Kent, OH	W 44–21		
November 3	at Toledo	Glass Bowl; Toledo, OH	T 7–7	25,570	
November 10	Eastern Michigan	Perry Shorts Stadium; Mount Pleasant, MI (rivalry)	W 37–14	19,889	
November 17	at Northwestern State *	Harry Turpin Stadium; Natchitoches, LA	W 28–0	6,700	
November 24	at San Jose State *	Spartan Stadium; San Jose, CA	W 34–32	10,424	
*Non-conference game

== Roster ==
1979 Central Michigan Chippewas football team roster
Players
Coaches
Offense

Pos.	#	Name	Class
QB	5	Gary Hogeboom	Sr
QB	3	Kevin Northup	Jr
G	67	Tony Vitale	So

Defense

Pos.	#	Name	Class
LB	57	Ray Bentley	Fr
S	23	Robert Jackson	Jr

Special teams

Pos.	#	Name	Class
K	2	Novo Bojovic	Fr

Head coach

- Herb Deromedi

Coordinators/assistant coaches

Legend

- (C) Team captain
- (S) Suspended
- (I) Ineligible
- Injured
- Redshirt
