= 1979 Drake Bulldogs football team =

American college football season

1979 Drake Bulldogs football
- Conference: Missouri Valley Conference
- Record: 3–8 (1–4 MVC)
- Head coach: Chuck Shelton (3rd season)
- Home stadium: Drake Stadium

1979 Missouri Valley Conference football standings
	Conf.					Overall
Team	W		L		T	W		L		T
West Texas State $	5	–	0	–	0	5	–	5	–	1
Southern Illinois	4	–	1	–	0	8	–	3	–	0
Indiana State	3	–	2	–	0	8	–	3	–	0
Drake	1	–	4	–	0	3	–	8	–	0
New Mexico State	1	–	4	–	0	2	–	9	–	0
Wichita State	1	–	4	–	0	1	–	10	–	0
Tulsa	0	–	0	–	0	6	–	5	–	0
$ – Conference champion; Tulsa was ineligible for MVC title

The 1979 Drake Bulldogs football team was an American football team that represented Drake University as a member of the Missouri Valley Conference (MVC) during the 1979 NCAA Division I-A football season. In their third year under head coach Chuck Shelton, the Bulldogs compiled an overall record of 3–8 record with a mark of 1–4 in conference play, placing tied for fourth in the MVC. Drake played home games at Drake Stadium in Des Moines, Iowa.

== Schedule ==
Date	Opponent	Site	Result	Attendance	Source
September 1	at Indiana State	Memorial Stadium; Terre Haute, IN	L 12–19	5,500	
September 8	New Mexico State	Drake Stadium; Des Moines, IA	W 14–13		
September 15	at Temple*	Franklin Field; Philadelphia, PA	L 21–42	10,872	
September 22	at Colorado*	Folsom Field; Boulder, CO	W 13–9	40,126	
September 29	Louisville*	Drake Stadium; Des Moines, IA	L 21–31	13,155	
October 6	Northeast Missouri State*	Drake Stadium; Des Moines, IA	W 41–6	9,380	
October 13	Long Beach State*	Drake Stadium; Des Moines, IA	L 14–17	8,658	
October 20	at Wichita State	Cessna Stadium; Wichita, KS	L 17–24	10,020	
November 3	Northern Michigan*	Drake Stadium; Des Moines, IA	L 26–30	7,665	
November 10	Southern Illinois	Drake Stadium; Des Moines, IA	L 21–22	5,070	
November 17	at West Texas State	Kimbrough Memorial Stadium; Canyon, TX	L 18–28		
*Non-conference game
