= 1979 UT Arlington Mavericks football team =

American college football season

1979 UT Arlington Mavericks football
- Conference: Southland Conference
- Record: 9–2 (4–1 Southland)
- Head coach: Harold Elliott (6th season)
- Home stadium: Cravens Field

1979 Southland Conference football standings
	Conf.					Overall
Team	W		L		T	W		L		T
McNeese State $	5	–	0	–	0	11	–	1	–	0
UT Arlington	4	–	1	–	0	9	–	2	–	0
Lamar	3	–	2	–	0	6	–	3	–	2
Arkansas State	1	–	4	–	0	4	–	7	–	0
Southwestern Louisiana	1	–	4	–	0	4	–	7	–	0
Louisiana Tech	1	–	4	–	0	2	–	9	–	0
$ – Conference champion; Louisiana Tech record includes one win by forfeit.

The 1979 UT Arlington Mavericks football team was an American football team that represented the University of Texas at Arlington in the Southland Conference during the 1979 NCAA Division I-A football season. In their sixth year under head coach Harold Elliott, the team compiled a 9–2 record.

== Schedule ==
Date	Opponent	Site	Result	Attendance	Source
September 8	at West Texas State*	Kimbrough Memorial Stadium; Canyon, TX	W 10–6	12,250	
September 15	vs. North Texas State*	Texas Stadium; Irving, TX	L 14–19	14,297	
September 22	Northwestern State*	Cravens Field; Arlington, TX	W 37–14	6,488	
September 29	at TCU*	Amon G. Carter Stadium; Fort Worth, TX	W 21–14	20,212	
October 6	McNeese State	Cravens Field; Arlington, TX	L 13–14	9,303	
October 20	at New Mexico State*	Aggie Memorial Stadium; Las Cruces, NM	W 42–14	15,224	
October 27	at Louisiana Tech	Joe Aillet Stadium; Ruston, LA	W 30–16	11,200	
November 3	at Arkansas State	Indian Stadium; Jonesboro, AR	W 56–18	12,672	
November 10	at Southwestern Louisiana	Cajun Field; Lafayette, LA	W 24–10	18,115	
November 17	Lamar	Cravens Field; Arlington, TX	W 47–37	7,296	
November 24	Idaho State*	Cravens Field; Arlington, TX	W 48–0	2,100	
*Non-conference game
