= 1979 Lamar Cardinals football team =

American college football season

1979 Lamar Cardinals football
- Conference: Southland Conference
- Record: 6–3–2 (3–2 Southland)
- Head coach: Larry Kennan (1st season)
- Home stadium: Cardinal Stadium

1979 Southland Conference football standings
	Conf.					Overall
Team	W		L		T	W		L		T
McNeese State $	5	–	0	–	0	11	–	1	–	0
UT Arlington	4	–	1	–	0	9	–	2	–	0
Lamar	3	–	2	–	0	6	–	3	–	2
Arkansas State	1	–	4	–	0	4	–	7	–	0
Southwestern Louisiana	1	–	4	–	0	4	–	7	–	0
Louisiana Tech	1	–	4	–	0	2	–	9	–	0
$ – Conference champion; Louisiana Tech record includes one win by forfeit.

The 1979 Lamar Cardinals football team represented Lamar University as a member of the Southland Conference during the 1979 NCAA Division I-A football season. The Cardinals played their home games at Cardinal Stadium now named Provost Umphrey Stadium in Beaumont, Texas. Lamar finished the 1979 season with a 6–3–2 overall record and a 3–2 conference record. The 1979 season marked Larry Kennan's first season as Lamar's head football coach. The season also marked higher attendance at Cardinal Stadium. The second and fourth highest attended games were recorded in the season with 17,600 attending the game against the Louisiana Tech Bulldogs and 17,250 attending the game against the West Texas State Buffaloes.

== Schedule ==
Date	Opponent	Site	Result	Attendance	Source
September 8	at Baylor*	Floyd Casey Stadium; Waco, TX	L 7–20	25,000	
September 15	at Western Kentucky*	L. T. Smith Stadium; Bowling Green, KY	W 58–27	14,600	
September 22	Louisiana Tech	Cardinal Stadium; Beaumont, TX	W 19–17	17,600	
October 6	West Texas State*	Cardinal Stadium; Beaumont, TX	T 12–12	17,250	
October 13	McNeese State	Cardinal Stadium; Beaumont, TX (rivalry)	L 25–34		
October 20	Southwestern Louisiana	Cardinal Stadium; Beaumont, TX (rivalry)	W 21–17		
October 27	at Arkansas State	Indian Stadium; Jonesboro, AR	W 20–10	10,212	
November 3	at Northeast Louisiana*	Malone Stadium; Monroe, LA	W 21–7	9,300	
November 10	Northwestern State*	Cardinal Stadium; Beaumont, TX	W 28–13		
November 17	at UT Arlington	Cravens Stadium; Arlington, TX	L 37–47	7,296	
November 23	at UNLV*	Las Vegas Silver Bowl; Whitney, NV	T 24–24	19,818	
*Non-conference game
