= 1979 West Texas State Buffaloes football team =

American college football season

1979 West Texas State Buffaloes football

MVC champion
- Conference: Missouri Valley Conference
- Record: 5–5–1 (5–0 MVC)
- Head coach: Bill Yung (3rd season)
- Home stadium: Kimbrough Memorial Stadium

1979 Missouri Valley Conference football standings
	Conf.					Overall
Team	W		L		T	W		L		T
West Texas State $	5	–	0	–	0	5	–	5	–	1
Southern Illinois	4	–	1	–	0	8	–	3	–	0
Indiana State	3	–	2	–	0	8	–	3	–	0
Drake	1	–	4	–	0	3	–	8	–	0
New Mexico State	1	–	4	–	0	2	–	9	–	0
Wichita State	1	–	4	–	0	1	–	10	–	0
Tulsa	0	–	0	–	0	6	–	5	–	0
$ – Conference champion; Tulsa was ineligible for MVC title

The 1979 West Texas State Buffaloes football team was an American football team that represented West Texas State University—now known as West Texas A&M University—as a member of the Missouri Valley Conference (MVC) during the 1979 NCAA Division I-A football season. In their third year under head coach Bill Yung, the Buffaloes compiled an overall record of 5–5–1 record with a mark of 5–0 in conference play, winning the MVC title.

== Schedule ==
Date	Opponent	Site	Result	Attendance	Source
September 1	Southern Illinois	Kimbrough Memorial Stadium; Canyon, TX	W 14–0	12,300	
September 8	UT Arlington*	Kimbrough Memorial Stadium; Canyon, TX	L 6–10	12,250	
September 15	at McNeese State*	Cowboy Stadium; Lake Charles, LA	L 3–10	19,500	
September 22	at Southwestern Louisiana*	Cajun Field; Lafayette, LA	L 10–19	20,145	
September 29	at No. 8 Houston*	Astrodome; Houston, TX	L 10–49	27,080	
October 6	at Lamar*	Cardinal Stadium; Beaumont, TX	T 12–12	17,250	
October 13	Indiana State^{†}	Kimbrough Memorial Stadium; Canyon, TX	W 33–17	15,766	
October 20	at North Texas State*	Fouts Field; Denton, TX	L 14–28	13,700	
October 27	at Wichita State	Cessna Stadium; Wichita, KS	W 58–0	9,127	
November 3	at New Mexico State	Aggie Memorial Stadium; Las Cruces, NM	W 54–21	12,202	
November 17	Drake	Kimbrough Memorial Stadium; Canyon, TX	W 28–18		
*Non-conference game; ^{†}Homecoming; Rankings from AP Poll released prior to the game
