= 1979 Princeton Tigers football team =

American college football season

1979 Princeton Tigers football
- Conference: Ivy League
- Record: 5–4 (5–2 Ivy)
- Head coach: Frank Navarro (2nd season)
- Captains: Matthew F. McGrath; Stephen R. Reynolds
- Home stadium: Palmer Stadium

1979 Ivy League football standings
	Conf.					Overall
Team	W		L		T	W		L		T
Yale $	6	–	1	–	0	8	–	1	–	0
Brown	5	–	2	–	0	6	–	3	–	0
Princeton	5	–	2	–	0	5	–	4	–	0
Cornell	4	–	3	–	0	5	–	4	–	0
Dartmouth	4	–	3	–	0	4	–	4	–	1
Harvard	3	–	4	–	0	3	–	6	–	0
Columbia	1	–	6	–	0	1	–	8	–	0
Penn	0	–	7	–	0	0	–	9	–	0
$ – Conference champion

The 1979 Princeton Tigers football team was an American football team that represented Princeton University during the 1979 NCAA Division I-A football season. Princeton tied for second in the Ivy League.

In their second year under head coach Frank Navarro, the Tigers compiled a 5–4 record and outscored opponents 166 to 152. Matthew F. McGrath and Stephen R. Reynolds were the team captains.

Princeton's 5–2 conference record tied for second place in the Ivy League standings. The Tigers outscored Ivy opponents 146 to 97.

Princeton played its home games at Palmer Stadium on the university campus in Princeton, New Jersey.

== Schedule ==
Date	Opponent	Site	Result	Attendance	Source
September 22	at Dartmouth	Memorial Field; Hanover, NH	W 16-0	14,500	
September 29	Rutgers*	Palmer Stadium; Princeton, NJ (rivalry)	L 14–38	23,523	
October 6	at Brown	Brown Stadium; Providence, RI	L 12–31	12,500	
October 13	Columbia	Palmer Stadium; Princeton, NJ	W 35-0	8,705	
October 20	Colgate*	Palmer Stadium; Princeton, NJ	L 6–17	12,687	
October 27	at Harvard	Harvard Stadium; Boston, MA (rivalry)	W 9-7	15,000	
November 3	at Penn	Franklin Field; Philadelphia, PA (rivalry)	W 38–10	13,604	
November 10	Yale	Palmer Stadium; Princeton, NJ (rivalry)	L 10–35	22,825	
November 17	Cornell	Palmer Stadium; Princeton, NJ	W 26-14	11,867	
*Non-conference game

== Roster ==
1979 Princeton Tigers football team roster
Players
Coaches
Offense

Pos.	#	Name	Class
RB	20	Cris Crissy	Jr
QB	9	Bob Holly	So
WR	87	Tom Michel	So
WR	18	Scott Oostdyk	So
QB	7	Steve Reynolds	Sr
RB	27	Fred Rosenberg	Sr
OT	66	Doug Smith	Sr
C	52	Ted Sotir	Sr
TE	81	Tom Trkla	Jr
RB	32	Larry Van Pelt	So

Defense

Pos.	#	Name	Class
DT	75	Steve Hart	Jr
DT	99	Jono Helmerich	So
DB	11	John Kistler	Jr
DT	60	Bob McNulty	Jr
DB	21	Henry Milligan	Jr
LB	35	Russ Moyer	Sr
DE	81	Steve Rowles	Sr
DE	92	Paul Van Pelt	Jr
LB	59	Scott Wright	So

Special teams

Pos.	#	Name	Class

Head coach

- Frank Navarro

Coordinators/assistant coaches

Legend

- (C) Team captain
- (S) Suspended
- (I) Ineligible
- Injured
- Redshirt
