= 1979 Cornell Big Red football team =

American college football season

1979 Cornell Big Red football
- Conference: Ivy League
- Record: 5–4 (4–3 Ivy)
- Head coach: Bob Blackman (3rd season)
- Captains: Brad Decker; Jim DeStefano
- Home stadium: Schoellkopf Field

1979 Ivy League football standings
	Conf.					Overall
Team	W		L		T	W		L		T
Yale $	6	–	1	–	0	8	–	1	–	0
Brown	5	–	2	–	0	6	–	3	–	0
Princeton	5	–	2	–	0	5	–	4	–	0
Cornell	4	–	3	–	0	5	–	4	–	0
Dartmouth	4	–	3	–	0	4	–	4	–	1
Harvard	3	–	4	–	0	3	–	6	–	0
Columbia	1	–	6	–	0	1	–	8	–	0
Penn	0	–	7	–	0	0	–	9	–	0
$ – Conference champion

The 1979 Cornell Big Red football team was an American football team that represented Cornell University during the 1979 NCAA Division I-A football season. Cornell tied for fourth in the Ivy League.

In its third season under head coach Bob Blackman, the team compiled a 5–4 record and outscored opponents 215 to 152. Brad Decker and Jim DeStefano were the team captains.

Cornell's 4–3 conference record tied for fourth place in the Ivy League standings. The Big Red outscored Ivy opponents 179 to 121.

Cornell played its home games at Schoellkopf Field in Ithaca, New York.

== Schedule ==
Date	Opponent	Site	Result	Attendance	Source
September 22	at Penn	Franklin Field; Philadelphia, PA (rivalry)	W 52–13	5,671	
September 29	Colgate*	Schoellkopf Field; Ithaca, NY (rivalry)	W 36–21	12,000	
October 6	No. T–6 Bucknell*	Schoellkopf Field; Ithaca, NY	L 0–10	7,500	
October 13	Harvard	Schoellkopf Field; Ithaca, NY	W 41–14	9,000	
October 20	at Brown	Brown Stadium; Providence, RI	L 7–28	13,500	
October 27	at Dartmouth	Memorial Field; Hanover, NH (rivalry)	W 21–10	10,600	
November 3	Yale	Schoellkopf Field; Ithaca, NY	L 20–23	18,500	
November 10	Columbia	Schoellkopf Field; Ithaca, NY (rivalry)	W 24–7	6,000	
November 17	at Princeton	Palmer Stadium; Princeton, NJ	L 14–26	11,867	
*Non-conference game
