= 1979 Western Michigan Broncos football team =

American college football season

1979 Western Michigan Broncos football
- Conference: Mid-American Conference
- Record: 6–5 (5–4 MAC)
- Head coach: Elliot Uzelac (5th season)
- MVP: Matt Murphy
- Captains: Tom Henry; Matt Murphy
- Home stadium: Waldo Stadium

1979 Mid-American Conference football standings
	Conf.					Overall
Team	W		L		T	W		L		T
Central Michigan $	8	–	0	–	1	10	–	0	–	1
Toledo	7	–	1	–	1	7	–	3	–	1
Western Michigan	5	–	4	–	0	6	–	5	–	0
Ball State	4	–	4	–	0	6	–	5	–	0
Ohio	4	–	4	–	0	6	–	5	–	0
Northern Illinois	3	–	3	–	1	5	–	5	–	1
Miami (OH)	3	–	4	–	0	6	–	5	–	0
Bowling Green	3	–	5	–	0	4	–	7	–	0
Eastern Michigan	1	–	6	–	1	2	–	8	–	1
Kent State	1	–	8	–	0	1	–	10	–	0
$ – Conference champion

The 1979 Western Michigan Broncos football team represented Western Michigan University in the Mid-American Conference (MAC) during the 1979 NCAA Division I-A football season. In their fifth season under head coach Elliot Uzelac, the Broncos compiled a 6–5 record (5–4 against MAC opponents), finished in third place in the MAC, and outscored their opponents, 186 to 120. The team played its home games at Waldo Stadium in Kalamazoo, Michigan.

The team's statistical leaders included Albert Little with 342 passing yards, Larry Caper with 844 rushing yards, and Tim Clysdale with 207 receiving yards. Tight end Tom Henry and defensive tackle Matt Murphy were the team captains. Murphy also received the team's most outstanding player award.

== Schedule ==
Date	Opponent	Site	Result	Attendance	Source
September 8	at Central Michigan	Perry Shorts Stadium; Mount Pleasant, MI (rivalry)	L 0–10	21,980	
September 15	at South Carolina*	Williams–Brice Stadium; Columbia, SC	L 7–24	50,137	
September 22	Northern Illinois	Waldo Stadium; Kalamazoo, MI	W 45–17		
September 29	Bowling Green	Waldo Stadium; Kalamazoo, MI	L 3–15		
October 6	Kent State	Waldo Stadium; Kalamazoo, MI	L 13–18		
October 13	at Toledo	Glass Bowl; Toledo, OH	L 0–17		
October 20	Grand Valley State*	Waldo Stadium; Kalamazoo, MI	W 37–0	14,500	
October 27	at Ohio	Peden Stadium; Athens, OH	W 20–6		
November 3	Miami (OH)	Waldo Stadium; Kalamazoo, MI	W 24–3		
November 10	Ball State	Waldo Stadium; Kalamazoo, MI	W 20–10	8,500	
November 17	at Eastern Michigan	Rynearson Stadium; Ypsilanti, MI	W 17–7		
*Non-conference game
