= 1979 Penn Quakers football team =

American college football season

1979 Penn Quakers football
- Conference: Ivy League
- Record: 0–9 (0–7 Ivy)
- Head coach: Harry Gamble (8th season)
- Home stadium: Franklin Field

1979 Ivy League football standings
	Conf.					Overall
Team	W		L		T	W		L		T
Yale $	6	–	1	–	0	8	–	1	–	0
Brown	5	–	2	–	0	6	–	3	–	0
Princeton	5	–	2	–	0	5	–	4	–	0
Cornell	4	–	3	–	0	5	–	4	–	0
Dartmouth	4	–	3	–	0	4	–	4	–	1
Harvard	3	–	4	–	0	3	–	6	–	0
Columbia	1	–	6	–	0	1	–	8	–	0
Penn	0	–	7	–	0	0	–	9	–	0
$ – Conference champion

The 1979 Penn Quakers football team represented the University of Pennsylvania in the 1979 NCAA Division I-A football season.

== Schedule ==
Date	Opponent	Site	Result	Attendance	Source
September 22	Cornell	Franklin Field; Philadelphia, PA (rivalry)	L 13–52	5,671	
September 29	at Lehigh*	Taylor Stadium; Bethlehem, PA	L 7–31	10,500	
October 6	at Columbia	Baker Field; New York, NY	L 7–12	7,850	
October 13	Brown	Franklin Field; Philadelphia, PA	L 18–24	5,651	
October 19	No. T–8 Lafayette*	Franklin Field; Philadelphia, PA	L 7–9	9,074	
October 27	at Yale	Yale Bowl; New Haven, CT	L 6–24	19,852	
November 3	Princeton	Franklin Field; Philadelphia, PA (rivalry)	L 10–38	13,604	
November 10	at Harvard	Harvard Stadium; Boston, MA (rivalry)	L 26–41	7,500	
November 17	Dartmouth	Franklin Field; Philadelphia, PA	L 6-20	10,397	
*Non-conference game; Rankings from AP Poll released prior to the game

== Roster ==
1979 Penn Quakers football team roster
Players
Coaches
Offense

Pos.	#	Name	Class
QB	15	Doug Marzonie
OT	77	Brian O’Neill
TE	86	Jerry Smith

Defense

Pos.	#	Name	Class
LB	36	Tom Mazich
LB	94	Dan Prendergast
DB	47	Dave Pace
DE	85	Jim Smith

Special teams

Pos.	#	Name	Class

Head coach

- Harry Gamble

Coordinators/assistant coaches

Legend

- (C) Team captain
- (S) Suspended
- (I) Ineligible
- Injured
- Redshirt
