= 1979 Louisiana Tech Bulldogs football team =

American college football season

1979 Louisiana Tech Bulldogs football
- Conference: Southland Conference
- Record: 3–8 (1–4 Southland)
- Head coach: Larry Beightol (1st season; first ten games); Pat Patterson (final game)
- Captains: Rodney Jones; Rick Reggio
- Home stadium: Joe Aillet Stadium

1979 Southland Conference football standings
| | Conf. | | | | | Overall |
| Team | W | | L | | T | W | | L | | T |
|---|---|---|---|---|---|---|---|---|---|---|
| McNeese State $ | 5 | – | 0 | – | 0 | 11 | – | 1 | – | 0 |
| UT Arlington | 4 | – | 1 | – | 0 | 9 | – | 2 | – | 0 |
| Lamar | 3 | – | 2 | – | 0 | 6 | – | 3 | – | 2 |
| Arkansas State | 1 | – | 4 | – | 0 | 4 | – | 7 | – | 0 |
| Southwestern Louisiana | 1 | – | 4 | – | 0 | 4 | – | 7 | – | 0 |
| Louisiana Tech | 1 | – | 4 | – | 0 | 2 | – | 9 | – | 0 |
$ – Conference champion; Louisiana Tech record includes one win by forfeit.

The 1979 Louisiana Tech Bulldogs football team was an American football team that represented Louisiana Tech University as a member of the Southland Conference during the 1979 NCAA Division I-A football season. In their only year under head coach Larry Beightol, the team compiled a 3–8 record. After going 1–9 through the first ten games of the season, head coach Larry Beightol was fired on November 12. Pat Patterson then served as interim head coach for the final game of the season and led the Bulldogs to a victory over Northeast Louisiana.

== Schedule ==
| Date | Opponent | Site | Result | Attendance | Source |
|---|---|---|---|---|---|
| September 1 | at New Mexico* | University Stadium; Albuquerque, NM | W 0–34 (UNM forfeit) | 27,380 | |
| September 15 | at Chattanooga* | Chamberlain Field; Chattanooga, TN | L 7–24 | 9,100 | |
| September 22 | at Lamar | Cardinal Stadium; Beaumont, TX | L 7–19 | 17,600 | |
| September 29 | at Miami (FL)* | Orange Bowl; Miami, FL | L 0–6 | 20,069 | |
| October 6 | Southwestern Louisiana | Joe Aillet Stadium; Ruston, LA (rivalry) | W 17–0 | 15,600 | |
| October 13 | Arkansas State | Joe Aillet Stadium; Ruston, LA | L 7–14 | 13,800 | |
| October 20 | vs. Northwestern State* | State Fair Stadium; Shreveport, LA (rivalry) | L 21–25 | 19,212 | |
| October 27 | UT Arlington | Joe Aillet Stadium; Ruston, LA | L 16–30 | 11,200 | |
| November 3 | vs. North Texas State* | State Fair Stadium; Shreveport, LA | L 17–19 | 3,600 | |
| November 10 | at McNeese State | Cowboy Stadium; Lake Charles, LA | L 7–41 | 19,375 | |
| November 17 | Northeast Louisiana* | Joe Aillet Stadium; Ruston, LA (rivalry) | W 13–10 | 17,300 | |
*Non-conference game
