= 1979 Northern Illinois Huskies football team =

American college football season

1979 Northern Illinois Huskies football
- Conference: Mid-American Conference
- Record: 5–5–1 (3–3–1 MAC)
- Head coach: Pat Culpepper (4th season)
- MVPs: Frank Lewandoski; Mike Pinckney
- Captain: All seniors
- Home stadium: Huskie Stadium

1979 Mid-American Conference football standings
	Conf.					Overall
Team	W		L		T	W		L		T
Central Michigan $	8	–	0	–	1	10	–	0	–	1
Toledo	7	–	1	–	1	7	–	3	–	1
Western Michigan	5	–	4	–	0	6	–	5	–	0
Ball State	4	–	4	–	0	6	–	5	–	0
Ohio	4	–	4	–	0	6	–	5	–	0
Northern Illinois	3	–	3	–	1	5	–	5	–	1
Miami (OH)	3	–	4	–	0	6	–	5	–	0
Bowling Green	3	–	5	–	0	4	–	7	–	0
Eastern Michigan	1	–	6	–	1	2	–	8	–	1
Kent State	1	–	8	–	0	1	–	10	–	0
$ – Conference champion

The 1979 Northern Illinois Huskies football team represented Northern Illinois University as a member of the Mid-American Conference (MAC) during 1979 NCAA Division I-A football season. Led by Pat Culpepper in his fourth and final season as head coach, the Huskies compiled an overall record of 5–5–1 with a mark of 3–3–1 in conference play, placing sixth in the MAC. Northern Illinois played home games at Huskie Stadium in DeKalb, Illinois.

== Schedule ==
Date	Opponent	Site	Result	Attendance	Source
September 15	East Tennessee State*	Huskie Stadium; DeKalb, IL	W 21–14	17,202	
September 22	at Western Michigan	Waldo Stadium; Kalamazoo, MI	L 17–45		
September 29	Long Beach State*	Huskie Stadium; DeKalb, IL	L 3–9	12,550	
October 6	at Eastern Michigan	Rynearson Stadium; Ypsilanti, MI	T 0–0		
October 13	at Central Michigan	Perry Shorts Stadium; Mount Pleasant, MI	L 11–31	20,327	
October 20	at Illinois State*	Hancock Stadium; Normal, IL	W 33–7	2,921	
October 27	Southern Illinois*	Huskie Stadium; DeKalb, IL	L 11–21	23,740	
November 3	Kent State	Huskie Stadium; DeKalb, IL	W 25–0	15,365	
November 10	Toledo	Huskie Stadium; DeKalb, IL	W 28–10		
November 17	at Ball State	Ball State Stadium; Muncie, IN (rivalry)	L 0–42	5,581	
November 24	Ohio	Huskie Stadium; DeKalb, IL	W 28–27	2,709	
*Non-conference game
