= 1979 Arkansas State Indians football team =

American college football season

1979 Arkansas State Indians football
- Conference: Southland Conference
- Record: 4–7 (1–4 Southland)
- Head coach: Larry Lacewell (1st season)
- Home stadium: Indian Stadium

1979 Southland Conference football standings
	Conf.					Overall
Team	W		L		T	W		L		T
McNeese State $	5	–	0	–	0	11	–	1	–	0
UT Arlington	4	–	1	–	0	9	–	2	–	0
Lamar	3	–	2	–	0	6	–	3	–	2
Arkansas State	1	–	4	–	0	4	–	7	–	0
Southwestern Louisiana	1	–	4	–	0	4	–	7	–	0
Louisiana Tech	1	–	4	–	0	2	–	9	–	0
$ – Conference champion; Louisiana Tech record includes one win by forfeit.

The 1979 Arkansas State Indians football team was an American football team that represented Arkansas State University as a member of the Southland Conference during the 1979 NCAA Division I-A football season. In their first season under head coach Larry Lacewell, Arkansas State compiled an overall record of 4–7 record with a conference mark of 1–4, placing in a three-way tie for fourth in the Southland .

== Schedule ==
Date	Opponent	Site	Result	Attendance	Source
September 8	East Texas State*	Indian Stadium; Jonesboro, AR	W 24–14		
September 15	at Northeast Louisiana*	Malone Stadium; Monroe, LA	L 17–18		
September 22	Southern Illinois*	Indian Stadium; Jonesboro, AR	W 24–16	16,803	
September 29	Southwestern Louisiana	Indian Stadium; Jonesboro, AR	L 9–13	17,638	
October 6	at Richmond*	City Stadium; Richmond, VA	W 24–3		
October 13	at Louisiana Tech	Joe Aillet Stadium; Ruston, LA	W 14–7	13,800	
October 20	at McNeese State	Cowboy Stadium; Lake Charles, LA	L 7–10		
October 27	Lamar^{†}	Indian Stadium; Jonesboro, AR	L 10–20	10,212	
November 3	UT Arlington*	Indian Stadium; Jonesboro, AR	L 18–56	12,672	
November 10	at Wyoming*	War Memorial Stadium; Laramie, WY	L 14–17		
November 17	at Southern Miss*	M. M. Roberts Stadium; Hattiesburg, MS	L 6–14	16,340	
*Non-conference game; ^{†}Homecoming

== 1980 NFL draft ==
The following Indian was selected in the 1980 NFL draft.

Round	Pick	Player	Position	NFL Club
2	37	Gene Bradley	Quarterback	Buffalo Bills
