= 1979 Southwestern Louisiana Ragin' Cajuns football team =

American college football season

1979 Southwestern Louisiana Ragin' Cajuns football
- Conference: Southland Conference
- Record: 4–7 (1–4 Southland)
- Head coach: Augie Tammariello (6th season)
- Home stadium: Cajun Field

1979 Southland Conference football standings
	Conf.					Overall
Team	W		L		T	W		L		T
McNeese State $	5	–	0	–	0	11	–	1	–	0
UT Arlington	4	–	1	–	0	9	–	2	–	0
Lamar	3	–	2	–	0	6	–	3	–	2
Arkansas State	1	–	4	–	0	4	–	7	–	0
Southwestern Louisiana	1	–	4	–	0	4	–	7	–	0
Louisiana Tech	1	–	4	–	0	2	–	9	–	0
$ – Conference champion; Louisiana Tech record includes one win by forfeit.

The 1979 Southwestern Louisiana Ragin' Cajuns football team was an American football team that represented the University of Southwestern Louisiana (now known as the University of Louisiana at Lafayette) in the Southland Conference during the 1979 NCAA Division I-A football season. In their sixth year under head coach Augie Tammariello, the team compiled a 4–7 record.

== Schedule ==
Date	Opponent	Site	Result	Attendance	Source
September 1	Northeast Louisiana*	Cajun Field; Lafayette, LA (rivalry)	W 17–13	19,150	
September 8	at Southern Illinois*	McAndrew Stadium; Carbondale, IL	L 7–17	13,388	
September 15	at Tulsa*	Skelly Stadium; Tulsa, OK	L 20–28	17,500	
September 22	West Texas State*	Cajun Field; Lafayette, LA	W 19–10	20,145	
September 29	at Arkansas State	Indian Stadium; Jonesboro, AR	W 13–9	17,638	
October 6	at Louisiana Tech	Joe Aillet Stadium; Ruston, LA (rivalry)	L 0–17	15,600	
October 13	Pacific (CA)*	Cajun Field; Lafayette, LA	L 7–10		
October 20	at Lamar	Cardinal Stadium; Beaumont, TX (rivalry)	L 17–21		
October 27	Cal Poly Pomona*	Cajun Field; Lafayette, LA	W 31–9	11,200	
November 10	UT Arlington	Cajun Field; Lafayette, LA	L 10–24	18,115	
November 17	McNeese State	Cajun Field; Lafayette, LA (Cajun Crown)	L 6–10		
*Non-conference game
