= 1979 Eastern Michigan Hurons football team =

American college football season

1979 Eastern Michigan Hurons football
- Conference: Mid-American Conference
- Record: 2–8–1 (1–6–1 MAC)
- Head coach: Mike Stock (2nd season)
- Captains: Doug Crisan; Kevin Wilkinson
- Home stadium: Rynearson Stadium

1979 Mid-American Conference football standings
	Conf.					Overall
Team	W		L		T	W		L		T
Central Michigan $	8	–	0	–	1	10	–	0	–	1
Toledo	7	–	1	–	1	7	–	3	–	1
Western Michigan	5	–	4	–	0	6	–	5	–	0
Ball State	4	–	4	–	0	6	–	5	–	0
Ohio	4	–	4	–	0	6	–	5	–	0
Northern Illinois	3	–	3	–	1	5	–	5	–	1
Miami (OH)	3	–	4	–	0	6	–	5	–	0
Bowling Green	3	–	5	–	0	4	–	7	–	0
Eastern Michigan	1	–	6	–	1	2	–	8	–	1
Kent State	1	–	8	–	0	1	–	10	–	0
$ – Conference champion

The 1979 Eastern Michigan Hurons football team represented Eastern Michigan University in the 1979 NCAA Division I-A football season. In their second season under head coach Mike Stock, the Hurons compiled a 2–8–1 record (1–6–1 against conference opponents), finished in ninth place in the Mid-American Conference, and were outscored by their opponents, 236 to 113. The team's statistical leaders included Scott Davis with 1,744 passing yards, Doug Crisan with 412 rushing yards, and Tom Parm with 701 receiving yards.

== Schedule ==
Date	Opponent	Site	Result	Attendance	Source
September 1	at Northern Michigan*	Memorial Field; Marquette, MI	W 21–7		
September 8	at Bowling Green	Doyt Perry Stadium; Bowling Green, OH	L 6–32		
September 15	at Ohio	Peden Stadium; Athens, OH	L 7–20		
September 22	at Illinois State*	Hancock Stadium; Normal, IL	L 15–24	4,949	
September 29	Toledo	Rynearson Stadium; Ypsilanti, MI	L 7–37		
October 6	Northern Illinois	Rynearson Stadium; Ypsilanti, MI	T 0–0		
October 13	Akron*	Rynearson Stadium; Ypsilanti, MI	L 12–24	4,555	
October 20	Kent State^{†}	Rynearson Stadium; Ypsilanti, MI	W 14–10		
November 3	at Ball State	Ball State Stadium; Muncie, IN	L 10–28		
November 10	at Central Michigan	Perry Shorts Stadium; Mount Pleasant, MI (rivalry)	L 14–37	19,889	
November 17	Western Michigan	Rynearson Stadium; Ypsilanti, MI	L 7–17		
*Non-conference game; ^{†}Homecoming

== Roster ==
1979 Eastern Michigan Hurons football team roster
Players
Coaches
Offense

Pos.	#	Name	Class
G	54	Dan DeChristoper	Jr
QB	9	Scott Davis	So

Defense

Pos.	#	Name	Class
LB	41	Ken Banks	Jr
DB	7	Ken Miller	Jr
LB	81	Mark Morgan	Jr

Special teams

Pos.	#	Name	Class
K	1	Craig Motzer	Jr

Head coach

- Mike Stock

Coordinators/assistant coaches

Legend

- (C) Team captain
- (S) Suspended
- (I) Ineligible
- Injured
- Redshirt
