= 1979 Brown Bears football team =

American college football season

1979 Brown Bears football
- Conference: Ivy League
- Record: 6–3 (5–2 Ivy)
- Head coach: John Anderson (7th season)
- Captains: J. Hickey; J. Sinnott
- Home stadium: Brown Stadium

1979 Ivy League football standings
	Conf.					Overall
Team	W		L		T	W		L		T
Yale $	6	–	1	–	0	8	–	1	–	0
Brown	5	–	2	–	0	6	–	3	–	0
Princeton	5	–	2	–	0	5	–	4	–	0
Cornell	4	–	3	–	0	5	–	4	–	0
Dartmouth	4	–	3	–	0	4	–	4	–	1
Harvard	3	–	4	–	0	3	–	6	–	0
Columbia	1	–	6	–	0	1	–	8	–	0
Penn	0	–	7	–	0	0	–	9	–	0
$ – Conference champion

The 1979 Brown Bears football team was an American football team that represented Brown University during the 1979 NCAA Division I-A football season. Brown tied for second place in the Ivy League.

In their seventh season under head coach John Anderson, the Bears compiled a 6–3 record and outscored opponents 197 to 129. J. Hickey and J. Sinnott were the team captains.

The Bears' 5–2 conference record tied for second in the Ivy League standings. They outscored Ivy opponents 159 to 102.

Brown played its home games at Brown Stadium in Providence, Rhode Island.

== Schedule ==
Date	Opponent	Site	Result	Attendance	Source
September 22	at Yale	Yale Bowl; New Haven, CT	L 12–13	15,000	
September 29	Rhode Island*	Brown Stadium; Providence, RI (rivalry)	W 31–13	11,250	
October 6	Princeton	Brown Stadium; Providence, RI	W 31–12	12,500	
October 13	at Penn	Franklin Field; Philadelphia, PA	W 24–18	5,651	
October 20	Cornell	Brown Stadium; Providence, RI	W 28–7	13,500	
October 27	at Holy Cross*	Fitton Field; Worcester, MA	L 7–14	10,011	
November 3	Harvard	Brown Stadium; Providence, RI	W 23–14	8,760	
November 10	at Dartmouth	Memorial Field; Hanover, NH	L 10–24	9,700	
November 17	Columbia	Brown Stadium; Providence, RI	W 31–14	8,500	
*Non-conference game

== Roster ==
1979 Brown Bears football team roster
Players
Coaches
Offense

Pos.	#	Name	Class
WR	4	Doug Brown	So
WR	87	Mike Campbell	So
QB	6	Gerry Ford	Jr
WR	25	Tom Fox	So
TE	85	Steve Jordan	So
OT	74	John Sinnott	Sr

Defense

Pos.	#	Name	Class
DB	17	Chris Bryant	So
LB	45	John Woodring	Jr

Special teams

Pos.	#	Name	Class
K	32	Tad Barrows	Sr

Head coach

- John Anderson

Coordinators/assistant coaches

Legend

- (C) Team captain
- (S) Suspended
- (I) Ineligible
- Injured
- Redshirt
