= 1979 Columbia Lions football team =

American college football season

1979 Columbia Lions football
- Conference: Ivy League
- Record: 1–8 (1–6 Ivy)
- Head coach: Bill Campbell (6th season)
- Captains: Brian O’Hagan; Geoff Stoner
- Home stadium: Baker Field

1979 Ivy League football standings
	Conf.					Overall
Team	W		L		T	W		L		T
Yale $	6	–	1	–	0	8	–	1	–	0
Brown	5	–	2	–	0	6	–	3	–	0
Princeton	5	–	2	–	0	5	–	4	–	0
Cornell	4	–	3	–	0	5	–	4	–	0
Dartmouth	4	–	3	–	0	4	–	4	–	1
Harvard	3	–	4	–	0	3	–	6	–	0
Columbia	1	–	6	–	0	1	–	8	–	0
Penn	0	–	7	–	0	0	–	9	–	0
$ – Conference champion

The 1979 Columbia Lions football team was an American football team that represented Columbia University during the 1979 NCAA Division I-A football season. Columbia finished second-to-last in the Ivy League.

In their sixth and final season under head coach Bill Campbell, the Lions compiled a 1–8 record and were outscored 215 to 68. Brian O’Hagan and Geoff Stoner were the team captains.

The Lions' 1–6 conference record placed seventh in the Ivy League standings. Columbia was outscored 177 to 47 by Ivy opponents.

Columbia played its home games at Baker Field in Upper Manhattan, in New York City.

== Schedule ==
Date	Opponent	Site	Result	Attendance	Source
September 22	Harvard	Baker Field; New York, NY	L 7–26	4,525	
September 29	at No. T–10 Lafayette*	Fisher Field; Easton, PA	L 7–14	8,500	
October 6	Penn	Baker Field; New York, NY	W 12–7	7,850	
October 13	at Princeton	Palmer Stadium; Princeton, NJ	L 0–35	8,705	
October 20	Yale^{†}	Baker Field; New York, NY	L 7–37	7,350	
October 27	Colgate*	Baker Field; New York, NY	L 14–24	5,025	
November 3	Dartmouth	Baker Field; New York, NY	L 0–17	2,150	
November 10	at Cornell	Schoellkopf Field; Ithaca, NY (rivalry)	L 7–24	6,000	
November 17	at Brown	Brown Stadium; Providence, RI	L 14–31	8,500	
*Non-conference game; ^{†}Homecoming
