= 1979 Tulsa Golden Hurricane football team =

American college football season

1979 Tulsa Golden Hurricane football
- Conference: Missouri Valley Conference
- Record: 6–5 (0–0 MVC)
- Head coach: John Cooper (3rd season)
- Home stadium: Skelly Stadium

1979 Missouri Valley Conference football standings
	Conf.					Overall
Team	W		L		T	W		L		T
West Texas State $	5	–	0	–	0	5	–	5	–	1
Southern Illinois	4	–	1	–	0	8	–	3	–	0
Indiana State	3	–	2	–	0	8	–	3	–	0
Drake	1	–	4	–	0	3	–	8	–	0
New Mexico State	1	–	4	–	0	2	–	9	–	0
Wichita State	1	–	4	–	0	1	–	10	–	0
Tulsa	0	–	0	–	0	6	–	5	–	0
$ – Conference champion; Tulsa was ineligible for MVC title

The 1979 Tulsa Golden Hurricane football team represented the University of Tulsa as a member of the Missouri Valley Conference (MVC) during the 1979 NCAA Division I-A football season. In their third year under head coach John Cooper, the Golden Hurricane compiled a 6–5 record. Tulsa played only two games against conference opponents, Wichita State and New Mexico State, but neither game counted in the conference standings.

The team's statistical leaders included quarterback Bill Blankenship with 627 passing yards, Paul Roberson with 546 rushing yards, and Paul Johns with 408 receiving yards. Head coach John Cooper was later inducted into the College Football Hall of Fame.

== Schedule ==
Date	Opponent	Site	Result	Attendance	Source
September 1	McNeese State*	Skelly Stadium; Tulsa, OK	L 3–6	24,600	
September 8	at Air Force*	Falcon Stadium; Colorado Springs, CO	W 24–7	23,000	
September 15	Southwestern Louisiana*	Skelly Stadium; Tulsa, OK	W 28–20	17,500	
September 22	at No. 3 Oklahoma*	Oklahoma Memorial Stadium; Norman, OK	L 13–49	71,187	
September 29	at No. 13 Arkansas*	Razorback Stadium; Fayetteville, AR	L 8–33	45,742	
October 6	at Kansas State*	KSU Stadium; Manhattan, KS	W 9–6	33,100	
October 13	at Louisville*	Fairgrounds Stadium; Louisville, KY	L 7–24	14,941	
October 20	TCU*^{†}	Skelly Stadium; Tulsa, OK	L 17–24	20,000	
October 27	at Florida*	Florida Field; Gainesville, FL	W 20–10	60,126	
November 3	Wichita State*	Skelly Stadium; Tulsa, OK	W 28–26	17,821	
November 10	New Mexico State*	Skelly Stadium; Tulsa, OK	W 38–16	10,065	
*Non-conference game; ^{†}Homecoming; Rankings from AP Poll released prior to the game

== After the season ==
=== 1980 NFL draft ===
The following Golden Hurricane player was selected in the 1980 NFL draft following the season.

Round	Pick	Player	Position	NFL club
12	313	Quinn Jones	Running back	Atlanta Falcons
