= 1979 Ball State Cardinals football team =

American college football season

1979 Ball State Cardinals football
- Conference: Mid-American Conference
- Record: 6–5 (4–4 MAC)
- Head coach: Dwight Wallace (2nd season)
- Home stadium: Ball State Stadium

1979 Mid-American Conference football standings
| | Conf. | | | | | Overall |
| Team | W | | L | | T | W | | L | | T |
|---|---|---|---|---|---|---|---|---|---|---|
| Central Michigan $ | 8 | – | 0 | – | 1 | 10 | – | 0 | – | 1 |
| Toledo | 7 | – | 1 | – | 1 | 7 | – | 3 | – | 1 |
| Western Michigan | 5 | – | 4 | – | 0 | 6 | – | 5 | – | 0 |
| Ball State | 4 | – | 4 | – | 0 | 6 | – | 5 | – | 0 |
| Ohio | 4 | – | 4 | – | 0 | 6 | – | 5 | – | 0 |
| Northern Illinois | 3 | – | 3 | – | 1 | 5 | – | 5 | – | 1 |
| Miami (OH) | 3 | – | 4 | – | 0 | 6 | – | 5 | – | 0 |
| Bowling Green | 3 | – | 5 | – | 0 | 4 | – | 7 | – | 0 |
| Eastern Michigan | 1 | – | 6 | – | 1 | 2 | – | 8 | – | 1 |
| Kent State | 1 | – | 8 | – | 0 | 1 | – | 10 | – | 0 |
$ – Conference champion

The 1979 Ball State Cardinals football team was an American football team that represented Ball State University in the Mid-American Conference (MAC) during the 1979 NCAA Division I-A football season. In its second season under head coach Dwight Wallace, the team compiled a 6–5 record (4–4 against MAC opponents) and finished in a tie for fourth place out of ten teams in the conference. The team played its home games at Ball State Stadium in Muncie, Indiana.

The team's statistical leaders included Dave Wilson with 1,452 passing yards, Mark Warlaumont with 713 rushing yards, Stevie Nelson with 487 receiving yards, and Mark Bornholdt with 114 points scored.

== Schedule ==
| Date | Opponent | Site | Result | Attendance | Source |
|---|---|---|---|---|---|
| September 8 | at Miami (OH) | Miami Field; Oxford, OH | L 3–27 | 16,438 | |
| September 15 | at Toledo | Glass Bowl; Toledo, OH | L 14–31 | | |
| September 22 | at Kent State | Dix Stadium; Kent, OH | W 35–10 | 4,000 | |
| September 29 | Southeastern Louisiana* | Ball State Stadium; Muncie, IN | W 17–7 | | |
| October 6 | at Indiana State* | Memorial Stadium; Terre Haute, IN (Blue Key Victory Bell) | L 13–18 | 11,278 | |
| October 13 | Illinois State* | Ball State Stadium; Muncie, IN | W 42–14 | 18,136 | |
| October 20 | Central Michigan | Ball State Stadium; Muncie, IN | L 30–31 | | |
| October 27 | Bowling Green | Ball State Stadium; Muncie, IN | W 38–23 | 15,736 | |
| November 3 | Eastern Michigan | Ball State Stadium; Muncie, IN | W 28–10 | | |
| November 10 | at Western Michigan | Waldo Stadium; Kalamazoo, MI | L 10–20 | 8,500 | |
| November 17 | Northern Illinois | Ball State Stadium; Muncie, IN (rivalry) | W 42–0 | 5,581 | |
*Non-conference game
