= 1979 NCAA Division I-A football season =

American college football season

1979 NCAA Division I-A season
- Number of teams: 139
- Preseason AP No. 1: USC

Postseason
- Bowl games: 15
- Heisman Trophy: USC running back Charles White
- Champion(s): Alabama (AP, Coaches, FWAA)

Division I-A football seasons
- ← 1978 1980 →

The 1979 NCAA Division I-A football season saw the Alabama Crimson Tide bring home a national title with a perfect 12–0 season. The title was Alabama's 11th claimed, and their 6th Associated Press awarded title.

This was an extremely dominant Alabama team, only giving up 67 points the entire season and shutting out five opponents. The team won a tight game against LSU 3–0 and beat Auburn by a touchdown before beating Arkansas 24–9 in the Sugar Bowl.

There was very little movement at the top of the rankings throughout the season, as only three different teams held the top spot in the AP poll and only two in the UPI poll. USC was the pre-season top-ranked team, and held the number one ranking until a 21–21 tie with Stanford, a game USC led at halftime 21–0. A fumbled hold on the snap from center cost the Trojans a chance at a last-second field goal. Stanford was led by quarterback Turk Schonert, while freshman John Elway served as his backup. USC ended up finishing second in the country, but running back Charles White brought home the Heisman Trophy.

No. 2 Alabama then took over the top spot and never relinquished that position in the UPI poll. In the AP poll, however, Ohio State took over the top spot in the last regular season poll of the season. Ohio State had defeated No. 13 Michigan in Ann Arbor by a score of 18–15 to earn the Big Ten title. Two weeks later, Alabama defeated No. 14 Auburn 25–18 in Birmingham, but the AP voters saw fit to jump Ohio State ahead of them.

Thus, Ohio State came within one point of a national title under first-year coach Earle Bruce, who replaced coach Woody Hayes, falling to USC 17–16 in the Rose Bowl after an undefeated season.

== Rule changes ==
- Blocking below the waist is prohibited on fumble recoveries (before they touch the ground), interceptions of forward and backward passes, on wide receivers beyond five yards past the line of scrimmage, on kickers until they are five yards past the line of scrimmage, and by backs beyond three yards past the line of scrimmage.
- Adding an automatic first down to defensive penalties for spearing, blows to the head or helmet, or kicking an opponent.
- Fouls committed by the receiving team during punts and kickoffs after the ball crosses the line of scrimmage result in enforcement from the spot of the foul, not from the previous spot and a re-kick as was previously the case.
- Eliminating offsetting penalties when a dead-ball foul is involved.

== Conference and program changes ==
- This season the total number of Division I-A teams grew by 1 to 139 with the addition of East Tennessee State as a member of the Southern Conference.

School	1978 Conference	1979 Conference
Hawaiʻi Rainbow Warriors	Independent	WAC

While Georgia Tech joined the ACC in non-football sports, the Yellow Jackets would not join ACC football until 1983.

== September ==
The preseason AP Poll featured last year's respective Coaches’ Poll and AP champions, USC and Alabama, at No. 1 and No. 2, followed by No. 3 Oklahoma, No. 4 Texas, and No. 5 Penn State.

September 8: No. 1 USC began the year on the road with a 21–7 victory over Texas Tech in Lubbock, while No. 2 Alabama traveled to Atlanta for a 30–6 win over Georgia Tech. The other teams in the top five had not yet started their seasons, but No. 6 Purdue moved up to No. 5 in the next poll with a 41–20 defeat of Wisconsin. The top four remained the same.

September 15: No. 1 USC obliterated Oregon State 42–5. No. 2 Alabama was idle. No. 3 Oklahoma opened their schedule with a 21–6 victory over Iowa. No. 4 Texas still had not started their season. In a bad day for Big Ten teams, No. 5 Purdue traveled to Los Angeles and lost 31–21 to UCLA, while No. 6 Michigan fell 12–10 to No. 9 Notre Dame on a blocked field goal attempt as time expired. Notre Dame rose to No. 5, with the top four remaining the same.

September 22: No. 1 USC beat Minnesota 48–14, No. 2 Alabama shut out Baylor 45–0, No. 3 Oklahoma defeated Tulsa 49–13, and No. 4 Texas finally began play with a 17–9 victory over Iowa State. No. 5 Notre Dame matched up against No. 17 Purdue, the team which they had just replaced in the top five, and lost 28–22 on a second-half comeback by the Boilermakers. No. 9 Missouri moved up to No. 5 with a 33–7 win at Mississippi. The top four again remained the same.

September 29: No. 1 USC visited No. 20 LSU and overcame a 12-3 fourth quarter deficit to win 17–12. No. 2 Alabama opened conference play in dominant fashion with a 66–3 victory at Vanderbilt, while Oklahoma overpowered Rice 63–21. No. 4 Texas and No. 5 Missouri squared off in Columbia, and the Longhorns shut out the Tigers 21–0. For the fourth week in a row, the top four remained the same with a new team at No. 5. This time the newcomer was Nebraska, which moved up from No. 6 by defeating No. 18 Penn State 42–17.

== October ==
October 6: All of the highly ranked teams won easily. No. 1 USC won 50–21 over Washington State, No. 2 Alabama blanked Wichita State 38–0, No. 3 Oklahoma defeated Colorado 49–24, No. 4 Texas beat Rice 26–9, and No. 5 Nebraska shut out New Mexico State 57–0. The top five remained the same.

October 13: This week finally saw some movement at the top of the polls. No. 1 USC blew a 21–0 halftime lead to Stanford, and the game ended in a 21–21 tie. No. 2 Alabama took over the top spot with a 40–0 victory over Florida; the Crimson Tide had outscored their first five opponents 219–9. No. 3 Oklahoma and No. 4 Texas met in the annual Red River Shootout, and the Longhorns prevailed 16–7. The Sooners’ other major rival, No. 5 Nebraska, shut out Kansas 42–0, while No. 7 Houston moved up with a 17–14 victory over Texas A&M. The next poll featured No. 1 Alabama, No. 2 Texas, No. 3 Nebraska, No. 4 USC, and No. 5 Houston.

October 20: No. 1 Alabama finally allowed an opponent to reach double digits in points, but still beat No. 18 Tennessee 27–17. No. 2 Texas fell 17–14 to No. 10 Arkansas, the Razorbacks’ first victory over the Longhorns in eight years. No. 3 Nebraska beat Oklahoma State 36-0 for their third consecutive shutout win. No. 4 USC got back on track with a 42–23 victory over No. 9 Notre Dame. No. 5 Houston defeated SMU 37–10, but still fell out of the top five. Ohio State had not been expected to be a major contender after the controversial firing of coach Woody Hayes, but the Buckeyes had risen to No. 6 in the polls under the direction of Earle Bruce, and a 59–0 win over Wisconsin brought them even higher. The next poll featured No. 1 Alabama, No. 2 Nebraska, and No. 3 USC, with Arkansas and Ohio State tied at No. 4.

October 27: No. 1 Alabama hosted Virginia Tech and won 31–7. No. 2 Nebraska allowed an opponent to score for the first time in almost a month, but the Cornhuskers were still dominant in a 38–10 win over Colorado. No. 3 USC defeated California 24–14. No. 4 Arkansas and No. 6 Houston met in Fayetteville, and the Cougars won 13–10 on a late field goal. Ohio State, tied with the Razorbacks at No. 4, recorded a second consecutive shutout by beating Michigan State 42–0. The next poll featured No. 1 Alabama, No. 2 Nebraska, No. 3 USC, No. 4 Houston, and No. 5 Ohio State.

== November ==
November 3: No. 1 Alabama defeated Mississippi State 24–7. No. 2 Nebraska had a close call against Missouri, which had beaten them in an upset the previous year. But the Cornhuskers pulled out a 23–20 win, beginning a 24-game winning streak over the Tigers which lasted into the 21st century. No. 3 USC won 34–7 over Arizona, No. 4 Houston defeated TCU 21–10, and No. 5 Ohio State beat Illinois 44–7. The Buckeyes moved up in the next poll: No. 1 Alabama, No. 2 Nebraska, No. 3 Ohio State, No. 4 USC, and No. 5 Houston.

November 10: No. 1 Alabama had trouble against unranked LSU, who held the Crimson Tide to a single field goal, but two fourth-quarter interceptions preserved a 3–0 win for coach Bear Bryant's squad. No. 2 Nebraska also struggled against last-place Kansas State, winning 21-12 despite losing five fumbles. No. 3 Ohio State won 34–7 over Iowa. No. 4 USC clinched the Pac-10 title and a Rose Bowl berth with a 24–17 win over the second-place team, No. 15 Washington. No. 5 Houston suffered its first loss, falling 21–13 to No. 8 Texas. No. 7 Florida State improved their record to 9–0 with a 27–7 win over No. 19 South Carolina and moved up in the next poll: No. 1 Alabama, No. 2 Ohio State, No. 3 Nebraska, No. 4 USC, and No. 5 Florida State.

November 17: No. 1 Alabama recorded their fifth shutout of the year, 30–0 over Miami. As was so often the case in the 1970s, the Big Ten title was decided in the Ohio State-Michigan game. The Wolverines had defeated the Buckeyes three years in a row (holding them without a touchdown in each game), but this time No. 2 Ohio State prevailed 18–15 over No. 13 Michigan. No. 3 Nebraska won 34–3 over Iowa State. No. 4 USC, who would be Ohio State's Rose Bowl opponent, was idle. No. 5 Florida State blasted Memphis 66–17. The top five remained the same.

November 23–24: No. 1 Alabama was idle as they prepared for their annual matchup against Auburn, and No. 2 Ohio State had finished its schedule. No. 3 Nebraska and No. 8 Oklahoma, both undefeated in conference play, squared off for the Big 8 title and a spot in the Orange Bowl. The Sooners won 17–14 behind 247 rushing yards from defending Heisman Trophy winner Billy Sims. No. 4 USC finished the year with a 49–14 win over UCLA, and No. 5 Florida State beat Florida 27–16, completing an unexpected perfect season under fourth-year coach Bobby Bowden. The next poll featured No. 1 Alabama, No. 2 USC, No. 3 Ohio State, No. 4 Florida State, and No. 5 Oklahoma.

== December ==
December 1: No. 1 Alabama was favored against No. 14 Auburn in the Iron Bowl, but the rival Tigers gave the Crimson Tide all they could handle. Alabama finally won 25–18 to preserve their perfect record and earn the SEC title and a Sugar Bowl berth. The other conference race which went down to the last day was the SWC, where No. 6 Texas, No. 8 Arkansas, and No. 10 Houston were all still in contention. A Longhorns loss (13–7 at Texas A&M) and a Cougars win (63–0 over Rice) delivered the Cotton Bowl berth to Houston, which shared the conference title with Arkansas but held the tiebreaker over the Razorbacks by virtue of their head-to-head win in October.

At the end of the regular season, five teams were undefeated and five others had just one loss. Alabama and Ohio State were both 11–0; the Coaches’ Poll kept the Crimson Tide in the top spot, but the AP voters moved the Buckeyes ahead after Alabama struggled to win their final game. In the final AP Poll before the bowls, No. 1 Ohio State and No. 2 Alabama were followed by No. 3 USC (10–0–1), No. 4 Florida State (11–0), No. 5 Oklahoma, No. 6 Arkansas, No. 7 Nebraska, No. 8 Houston (all 10–1), No. 9 Brigham Young (11–0, but with just one game against a major conference opponent), and No. 10 Pittsburgh (10–1). The major bowl matchups were Ohio State vs. USC in the Rose Bowl, Alabama vs. Arkansas in the Sugar, Oklahoma vs. Florida State in the Orange, and Houston vs. Nebraska in the Cotton.

== Conference standings ==
1979 Atlantic Coast Conference football standings
	Conf.					Overall
Team	W		L		T	W		L		T
NC State $	5	–	1	–	0	7	–	4	–	0
Clemson	4	–	2	–	0	8	–	4	–	0
Maryland	4	–	2	–	0	7	–	4	–	0
Wake Forest	3	–	2	–	0	8	–	4	–	0
No. 15 North Carolina	3	–	3	–	0	8	–	3	–	1
Virginia	1	–	4	–	0	6	–	5	–	0
Duke	0	–	6	–	0	2	–	8	–	1
$ – Conference champion; Rankings from AP Poll

1979 Big Eight Conference football standings
	Conf.					Overall
Team	W		L		T	W		L		T
No. 3 Oklahoma $	7	–	0	–	0	11	–	1	–	0
No. 9 Nebraska	6	–	1	–	0	10	–	2	–	0
Oklahoma State	5	–	2	–	0	7	–	4	–	0
Missouri	3	–	4	–	0	7	–	5	–	0
Colorado	2	–	5	–	0	3	–	8	–	0
Iowa State	2	–	5	–	0	3	–	8	–	0
Kansas	2	–	5	–	0	3	–	8	–	0
Kansas State	1	–	6	–	0	3	–	8	–	0
$ – Conference champion; Rankings from AP Poll

1979 Big Ten Conference football standings
	Conf.					Overall
Team	W		L		T	W		L		T
No. 4 Ohio State $	8	–	0	–	0	11	–	1	–	0
No. 10 Purdue	7	–	1	–	0	10	–	2	–	0
No. 18 Michigan	6	–	2	–	0	8	–	4	–	0
No. 19 Indiana	5	–	3	–	0	8	–	4	–	0
Iowa	4	–	4	–	0	5	–	6	–	0
Minnesota	3	–	5	–	1	4	–	6	–	1
Michigan State	3	–	5	–	0	5	–	6	–	0
Wisconsin	3	–	5	–	0	4	–	7	–	0
Illinois	1	–	6	–	1	2	–	8	–	1
Northwestern	0	–	9	–	0	1	–	10	–	0
$ – Conference champion; Rankings from AP Poll

1979 Ivy League football standings
	Conf.					Overall
Team	W		L		T	W		L		T
Yale $	6	–	1	–	0	8	–	1	–	0
Brown	5	–	2	–	0	6	–	3	–	0
Princeton	5	–	2	–	0	5	–	4	–	0
Cornell	4	–	3	–	0	5	–	4	–	0
Dartmouth	4	–	3	–	0	4	–	4	–	1
Harvard	3	–	4	–	0	3	–	6	–	0
Columbia	1	–	6	–	0	1	–	8	–	0
Penn	0	–	7	–	0	0	–	9	–	0
$ – Conference champion

1979 Mid-American Conference football standings
	Conf.					Overall
Team	W		L		T	W		L		T
Central Michigan $	8	–	0	–	1	10	–	0	–	1
Toledo	7	–	1	–	1	7	–	3	–	1
Western Michigan	5	–	4	–	0	6	–	5	–	0
Ball State	4	–	4	–	0	6	–	5	–	0
Ohio	4	–	4	–	0	6	–	5	–	0
Northern Illinois	3	–	3	–	1	5	–	5	–	1
Miami (OH)	3	–	4	–	0	6	–	5	–	0
Bowling Green	3	–	5	–	0	4	–	7	–	0
Eastern Michigan	1	–	6	–	1	2	–	8	–	1
Kent State	1	–	8	–	0	1	–	10	–	0
$ – Conference champion

1979 Missouri Valley Conference football standings
	Conf.					Overall
Team	W		L		T	W		L		T
West Texas State $	5	–	0	–	0	5	–	5	–	1
Southern Illinois	4	–	1	–	0	8	–	3	–	0
Indiana State	3	–	2	–	0	8	–	3	–	0
Drake	1	–	4	–	0	3	–	8	–	0
New Mexico State	1	–	4	–	0	2	–	9	–	0
Wichita State	1	–	4	–	0	1	–	10	–	0
Tulsa	0	–	0	–	0	6	–	5	–	0
$ – Conference champion; Tulsa was ineligible for MVC title

1979 Pacific Coast Athletic Association football standings
	Conf.					Overall
Team	W		L		T	W		L		T
Utah State $	5	–	0	–	0	8	–	3	–	0
Long Beach State	3	–	2	–	0	7	–	4	–	0
Fresno State	3	–	2	–	0	5	–	6	–	0
Cal State Fullerton	2	–	3	–	0	4	–	7	–	0
San Jose State	2	–	3	–	0	3	–	8	–	0
Pacific (CA)	0	–	5	–	0	3	–	7	–	0
$ – Conference champion; Records adjusted for San Jose State forfeits

1979 Pacific-10 Conference football standings
	Conf.					Overall
Team	W		L		T	W		L		T
No. 2 USC $	6	–	0	–	1	11	–	0	–	1
No. 11 Washington	5	–	2	–	0	9	–	3	–	0
Arizona	4	–	3	–	0	6	–	5	–	1
Oregon	4	–	3	–	0	6	–	5	–	0
California	5	–	4	–	0	6	–	6	–	0
Stanford	3	–	3	–	1	5	–	5	–	1
Arizona State *	3	–	4	–	0	6	–	6	–	0
UCLA	3	–	4	–	0	5	–	6	–	0
Washington State	2	–	6	–	0	3	–	8	–	0
Oregon State	1	–	7	–	0	1	–	10	–	0
$ – Conference champion; * – Arizona State later forfeited 5 wins (3 in conference) due to NCAA sanctions; Rankings from AP Poll

1979 Southeastern Conference football standings
	Conf.					Overall
Team	W		L		T	W		L		T
No. 1 Alabama $	6	–	0	–	0	12	–	0	–	0
Georgia	5	–	1	–	0	6	–	5	–	0
No. 16 Auburn	4	–	2	–	0	8	–	3	–	0
LSU	4	–	2	–	0	7	–	5	–	0
Tennessee	3	–	3	–	0	7	–	5	–	0
Kentucky	3	–	3	–	0	5	–	6	–	0
Ole Miss	3	–	3	–	0	4	–	7	–	0
Mississippi State	2	–	4	–	0	3	–	8	–	0
Vanderbilt	0	–	6	–	0	1	–	10	–	0
Florida	0	–	6	–	0	0	–	10	–	1
$ – Conference champion; Rankings from AP Poll

1979 Southern Conference football standings
	Conf.					Overall
Team	W		L		T	W		L		T
Chattanooga $	5	–	1	–	0	9	–	2	–	0
VMI	4	–	1	–	0	6	–	4	–	1
The Citadel	4	–	2	–	0	6	–	5	–	0
Furman	4	–	3	–	0	5	–	6	–	0
Appalachian State	3	–	4	–	0	3	–	8	–	0
East Tennessee State	2	–	3	–	0	7	–	4	–	0
Western Carolina	2	–	4	–	0	6	–	5	–	0
Marshall	0	–	6	–	0	1	–	10	–	0
Davidson	0	–	0	–	0	6	–	4	–	0
$ – Conference champion

1979 Southland Conference football standings
	Conf.					Overall
Team	W		L		T	W		L		T
McNeese State $	5	–	0	–	0	11	–	1	–	0
UT Arlington	4	–	1	–	0	9	–	2	–	0
Lamar	3	–	2	–	0	6	–	3	–	2
Arkansas State	1	–	4	–	0	4	–	7	–	0
Southwestern Louisiana	1	–	4	–	0	4	–	7	–	0
Louisiana Tech	1	–	4	–	0	2	–	9	–	0
$ – Conference champion; Louisiana Tech record includes one win by forfeit.

1979 Southwest Conference football standings
	Conf.					Overall
Team	W		L		T	W		L		T
No. 5 Houston +	7	–	1	–	0	11	–	1	–	0
No. 8 Arkansas +	7	–	1	–	0	10	–	2	–	0
No. 12 Texas	6	–	2	–	0	9	–	3	–	0
No. 14 Baylor	5	–	3	–	0	8	–	4	–	0
Texas A&M	4	–	4	–	0	6	–	5	–	0
SMU	3	–	5	–	0	5	–	6	–	0
Texas Tech	2	–	5	–	1	3	–	6	–	2
TCU	1	–	6	–	1	2	–	8	–	1
Rice	0	–	8	–	0	1	–	10	–	0
+ – Conference co-champions; Rankings from AP Poll

1979 Western Athletic Conference football standings
	Conf.					Overall
Team	W		L		T	W		L		T
No. 13 BYU $	7	–	0	–	0	11	–	1	–	0
Utah	5	–	2	–	0	6	–	6	–	0
San Diego State	4	–	2	–	0	8	–	3	–	0
Hawaii	3	–	3	–	0	6	–	5	–	0
New Mexico	3	–	4	–	0	6	–	6	–	0
Colorado State	3	–	4	–	0	4	–	7	–	1
Wyoming	2	–	5	–	0	4	–	8	–	0
UTEP	0	–	7	–	0	2	–	9	–	0
$ – Conference champion; Rankings from AP Poll

1979 NCAA Division I-A independents football records
	Conf.					Overall
Team	W		L		T	W		L		T
No. 6 Florida State		–		–		11	–	1	–	0
No. 7 Pittsburgh		–		–		11	–	1	–	0
UNLV		–		–		9	–	1	–	2
No. 17 Temple		–		–		10	–	2	–	0
Tulane		–		–		9	–	3	–	0
Rutgers		–		–		8	–	3	–	0
Tennessee State		–		–		8	–	3	–	0
East Carolina		–		–		7	–	3	–	1
No. 20 Penn State		–		–		8	–	4	–	0
South Carolina		–		–		8	–	4	–	0
Navy		–		–		7	–	4	–	0
Notre Dame		–		–		7	–	4	–	0
Southern Miss		–		–		6	–	4	–	1
Syracuse		–		–		7	–	5	–	0
Colgate		–		–		5	–	4	–	1
Boston College		–		–		5	–	6	–	0
Holy Cross		–		–		5	–	6	–	0
Memphis State		–		–		5	–	6	–	0
Miami (FL)		–		–		5	–	6	–	0
North Texas State		–		–		5	–	6	–	0
Villanova		–		–		5	–	6	–	0
Virginia Tech		–		–		5	–	6	–	0
West Virginia		–		–		5	–	6	–	0
Georgia Tech		–		–		4	–	6	–	1
Louisville		–		–		4	–	6	–	1
William & Mary		–		–		4	–	7	–	0
Illinois State		–		–		3	–	8	–	0
Northeast Louisiana		–		–		3	–	8	–	0
Army		–		–		2	–	8	–	1
Air Force		–		–		2	–	9	–	0
Cincinnati		–		–		2	–	9	–	0
Richmond		–		–		0	–	11	–	0
Rankings from AP Poll

== No. 1 and No. 2 progress ==
WEEKS	No. 1	No. 2	Event
PRE-5	USC	Alabama	Stanford 21, USC 21 (Oct 13)
6	Alabama	Texas	Arkansas 17, Texas 14 (Oct 20)
7–9	Alabama	Nebraska	Ohio State 34, Iowa 7 (Nov 10)
10–11	Alabama	Ohio State	USC 49, UCLA 14 (Nov 24)
12	Alabama	USC	
13	Ohio State	Alabama	USC 17, Ohio State 16

== Notable rivalry games ==
- Alabama 25, Auburn 18
- Oklahoma 17, Nebraska 14
- Ohio State 18, Michigan 15
- Navy 31, Army 7
- Texas 16, Oklahoma 7
- Arkansas 17, Texas 14
- Texas A&M 13, Texas 7
- Tulane 24, LSU 13
- USC 42, Notre Dame 23
- USC 49, UCLA 14
- California 21, Stanford 14
- Pittsburgh 29, Penn State 14

== I-AA team wins over I-A teams ==
Italics denotes I-AA teams.

Date	Visiting team	Home team	Site	Result	Attendance	Ref.
September 8	Eastern Kentucky	Kent State	Dix Stadium • Kent, Ohio	17–14	11,045	
September 8	Presbyterian	The Citadel	Johnson Hagood Stadium • Charleston, South Carolina	21–13	17,500	
September 15	Holy Cross	New Hampshire	Cowell Stadium • Durham, New Hampshire	17–26	12,500	
September 15	Presbyterian	Furman	Sirrine Stadium • Greenville, South Carolina	17–10	9,844	
September 22	Boise State	Cal State Fullerton	Falcon Stadium • Norwalk, California	22–3	3,439	
September 22	Pacific (CA)	Idaho	Kibbie Dome • Moscow, Idaho	13–17		
September 29	Columbia	No. T–10 (I-AA) Lafayette	Fisher Field • Easton, Pennsylvania	7–14	8,500	
September 29	Penn	Lehigh	Taylor Stadium • Bethlehem, Pennsylvania	7–31	10,500	
September 29	UMass	Harvard	Harvard Stadium • Boston, Massachusetts	20–7	15,000	
October 6	No. T–3 (I-AA) Boston University	Harvard	Harvard Stadium • Boston, Massachusetts	14–10	12,500	
October 6	No. T–7 (I-AA) Bucknell	Cornell	Schoellkopf Field • Ithaca, New York	10–0	7,500	
October 6	Miami (FL)	No. 1 (I-AA) Florida A&M	Doak Campbell Stadium • Tallahassee, Florida	13–16	34,743	
October 6	Nicholls State	Northeast Louisiana	Malone Stadium • Monroe, Louisiana	23–16		
October 6	Furman	Wofford	Snyder Field • Spartanburg, South Carolina (Deep South's oldest rivalry)	17–27	7,000	
October 13	Cal State Fullerton	No. 7 (I-AA) Eastern Kentucky	Hanger Field • Richmond, Kentucky	7–33	10,100	
October 19	No. T–8 (I-AA) Lafayette	Penn	Franklin Field • Philadelphia, Pennsylvania	9–7	9,074	
November 3	No. 3 (I-AA) Boston University	Holy Cross	Fitton Field • Worcester, Massachusetts	16–7	3,711	
November 10	Connecticut	No. 3 (I-AA) Boston University	Nickerson Field • Boston, Massachusetts	12–16		
^{#}Rankings from AP Poll released prior to game.

Note: New Hampshire at Connecticut tied 3–3.

=== Division II team wins over I-A teams ===
Italics denotes D-II teams.

Date	Visiting team	Home team	Site	Result	Attendance	Ref.
September 8	Illinois State	Youngstown State	Stambaugh Stadium • Youngstown, Ohio	27–33	6,012	
September 15	Kent State	Akron	Rubber Bowl • Akron, Ohio (Wagon Wheel)	13–15	21,645	
October 6	Youngstown State	Villanova	Villanova Stadium • Villanova, Pennsylvania	27–22	4,807	
October 13	Akron	Eastern Michigan	Rynearson Stadium • Ypsilanti, Michigan	24–12	4,555	
October 13	No. 1 (I-AA) Delaware	Villanova	Villanova Stadium • Villanova, Pennsylvania (Battle of the Blue)	21–20	14,500	
October 27	William & Mary	No. 1 (I-AA) Delaware	Delaware Stadium • Newark, Delaware (rivalry)	0–40	19,728	
November 10	Eastern Illinois	Illinois State	Hancock Stadium • Normal, Illinois (Mid-America Classic)	24–0	10,272	
November 17	No. 1 (I-AA) Delaware	Colgate	Andy Kerr Stadium • Hamilton, New York	24–16	5,000	
^{#}Rankings from AP Poll released prior to game.

== Bowl games ==
New Year's Day Bowls:

Rose Bowl	No. 3 USC	17	No. 1 Ohio State	16
Sugar Bowl	No. 2 Alabama	24	No. 6 Arkansas	9
Orange Bowl	No. 5 Oklahoma	24	No. 4 Florida State	7
Cotton Bowl	No. 8 Houston	17	No. 7 Nebraska	14

Other Bowls:

Bluebonnet Bowl	No. 12 Purdue	27	Tennessee	22
Peach Bowl	No. 19 Baylor	24	No. 18 Clemson	18
Hall of Fame Classic	Missouri	24	No. 16 South Carolina	14
Gator Bowl	North Carolina	17	No. 14 Michigan	15
Fiesta Bowl	No. 10 Pittsburgh	16	Arizona	10
Sun Bowl	No. 13 Washington	14	No. 11 Texas	7
Liberty Bowl	Penn State	9	No. 15 Tulane	6
Tangerine Bowl	LSU	34	Wake Forest	10
Holiday Bowl	Indiana	38	No. 9 Brigham Young	37
Garden State Bowl	No. 20 Temple	28	California	17
Independence Bowl	Syracuse	31	McNeese State	7

== Final AP and UPI rankings ==
Rank	AP	UPI
1.	Alabama	Alabama
2.	USC	USC
3.	Oklahoma	Oklahoma
4.	Ohio State	Ohio State
5.	Houston	Houston
6.	Florida State	Pittsburgh
7.	Pittsburgh	Nebraska
8.	Arkansas	Florida State
9.	Nebraska	Arkansas
10.	Purdue	Purdue
11.	Washington	Washington
12.	Texas	BYU
13.	BYU	Texas
14.	Baylor	North Carolina
15.	North Carolina	Baylor
16.	Auburn	Indiana
17.	Temple	Temple
18.	Michigan	Penn State
19.	Indiana	Michigan
20.	Penn State	Missouri

== Heisman Trophy voting ==
The Heisman Trophy is given to the year's most outstanding player

Player	School	Position	1st	2nd	3rd	Total
Charles White	USC	RB	453	144	48	1,695
Billy Sims	Oklahoma	RB	82	180	167	773
Marc Wilson	BYU	QB	72	124	125	589
Art Schlichter	Ohio State	QB	19	54	86	251
Vagas Ferguson	Notre Dame	RB	12	38	50	162
Paul McDonald	USC	QB	11	18	23	92
George Rogers	South Carolina	RB	8	20	17	81
Mark Herrmann	Purdue	QB	5	12	15	54
Ron Simmons	Florida State	MG	5	8	10	41
Steadman Shealy	Alabama	QB	1	10	9	32

== Other major awards ==
- Maxwell (outstanding player) – Charles White, TB, USC
- Outland – Jim Ritcher, C, North Carolina State
- Camp – Charles White, TB, USC
- Lombardi – Brad Budde, G, USC

== See also ==
- 1979 NCAA Division I-AA football season
- 1979 NCAA Division II football season
- 1979 NCAA Division III football season

== Attendances ==
Average home attendance top 3:

Rank	Team	Average
1	Michigan Wolverines	104,331
2	Ohio State Buckeyes	87,399
3	Tennessee Volunteers	85,357
