= 1980 New York Giants season =

NFL team season

- Owner: Timothy J. Mara; Wellington Mara
- General manager: George Young
- Head coach: Ray Perkins
- Home stadium: Giants Stadium

Results
- Record: 4–12
- Division place: 5th NFC East
- Playoffs: Did not qualify
- Pro Bowlers: LB Brad Van Pelt; P Dave Jennings

The 1980 New York Giants season was the franchise's 56th season in the National Football League. The Giants finished in last place in the National Football Conference East Division with a 4–12 record.

In the 1980 NFL draft, the Giants selected defensive back Mark Haynes with their first-round pick, which was eighth overall. New York won its opening game of the season against the St. Louis Cardinals, 41–35, behind a five-touchdown performance by quarterback Phil Simms. Four of those touchdown passes were to Earnest Gray, who set a single-game franchise record for touchdown receptions. The Giants lost the following game to Washington by two points, the start of an eight-game losing streak. A Week 10 win over the Dallas Cowboys snapped the streak; a subsequent win over the Green Bay Packers was followed by a pair of defeats. A shoulder injury caused Simms to miss the last three games of the season. Scott Brunner took over as the starting quarterback for those games, during which the Giants went 1–2.

Simms threw for 2,321 yards in his 13 appearances, and had 15 touchdown passes and 19 interceptions. Brunner threw for four touchdowns and had six interceptions. New York's leading rusher was Billy Taylor, who ran for 580 yards and four touchdowns. Gray had a team-leading 10 touchdown receptions during the season, and caught 52 passes for 777 yards. On defense, Mike Dennis led the Giants with five interceptions. Two Giants players, Dave Jennings and Brad Van Pelt, were selected for the 1981 Pro Bowl.

== Offseason ==
=== NFL draft ===
1980 New York Giants draft
Round	Pick	Player	Position	College	Notes
1	8	Mark Haynes *	Cornerback	Colorado	
3	64	Myron Lapka	Nose tackle	USC	
4	90	Danny Pittman	Wide receiver	Wyoming	
5	118	Tony Blount	Defensive back	Virginia	
6	145	Scott Brunner	Quarterback	Delaware	
7	179	Bud Hebert	Defensive back	Oklahoma	
7	181	Chris Linnin	Defensive end	Washington	
8	200	Ken Harris	Running back	Alabama	
9	229	Otis Wonsley	Running back	Alcorn State	
10	256	Joe Sanford	Tackle	Washington	
11	285	Steve Bernish	Defensive end	South Carolina	
12	312	Mike Lansford	Kicker	Washington	
Made roster * Made at least one Pro Bowl during career

== Personnel ==
=== Staff ===
1980 New York Giants staff
Front office: President – Wellington Mara; General Manager – George Young; Director of Pro Personnel – Jim Trimble; Head coaches: Head Coach – Ray Perkins; Offensive coaches: Offensive Backfield – Bob Lord; Receivers – Pat Hodgson; Offensive Line – Bill Austin; Offensive Assistant – Ernie Adams	Defensive coaches: Defensive Coordinator – Ralph Hawkins; Defensive Line – Lamar Leachman; Defensive Backfield – Deek Pollard; Special teams coaches: Special Teams – Bill Belichick

=== Roster ===
1980 New York Giants roster
Quarterbacks (QB): 12 Scott Brunner; 15 Cliff Olander; 11 Phil Simms; Running backs (RB): 27 Larry Heater; 41 Bo Matthews; 30 Leon Perry; 34 Nate Rivers; 38 Billy Taylor; Wide receivers (WR): 83 Earnest Gray; 84 Nate Johnson; 82 Danny Pittman; Tight ends (TE): 89 Dennis Johnson; 81 Tom Mullady; 87 Gary Shirk	Offensive linemen (OL): 60 Brad Benson T; 56 Jim Clack C; 63 Terry Falcon G; 77 Vernon Holland T; 72 Gordon King T; 59 Kelly Saalfeld C; 69 Roy Simmons G; 65 John Sinnott T; 68 J. T. Turner G; Defensive linemen (DL): 70 Gary Jeter DE; 71 Myron Lapka DE; 74 Chris Linnin DE; 79 Dale Markham DE; 75 George Martin DE; 78 George Small NT; 80 Phil Tabor NT	Linebackers (LB): 62 Ben Apuna ILB; 52 Joe McLaughlin ILB; 66 Kevin Turner OLB; 10 Brad Van Pelt OLB; 58 Mike Whittington OLB; 99 Kervin Wyatt ILB; Defensive backs (DB): 22 Eric Felton CB; 36 Mark Haynes CB; 47 Steve Henry SS; 33 Jerome King CB; 21 Don Patterson CB; 28 Beasley Reece SS; 20 Gary Woolford FS; Special teams (ST): 18 Joe Danelo K; 13 Dave Jennings P	Reserve: 23 Tony Blount S (IR); 53 Harry Carson LB (IR); 46 Mike Dennis CB (IR); -- Keith Eck C (NF-Ill.); 88 Mike Friede WR (IR); -- Larry Flowers S (IR); 25 Alvin Garrett RB (IR); 37 Don Harris S (IR); 26 Bud Hebert S (IR); 24 Terry Jackson CB (IR); 55 Brian Kelley LB (IR); 44 Doug Kotar RB (IR); 54 Dan Lloyd LB (NF-Ill.); 51 Frank Marion LB (IR); 76 Curtis McGriff DT (IR); 86 Johnny Perkins WR (IR); 57 John Skorupan LB (IR); -- Steve Tobin C (IR); 73 Jeff Weston T (IR); Rookies in italics

== Schedule ==
Week	Date	Opponent	Result	Record	Venue	Attendance
1	September 7	at **St. Louis Cardinals**	**W** 41–35	1–0	Busch Memorial Stadium	49,122
2	September 14	**Washington Redskins**	**L** 21–23	1–1	Giants Stadium	73,343
3	September 22	at **Philadelphia Eagles**	**L** 3–35	1–2	Veterans Stadium	70,767
4	September 28	Los Angeles Rams	**L** 7–28	1–3	Giants Stadium	73,414
5	October 5	at **Dallas Cowboys**	**L** 3–24	1–4	Texas Stadium	59,126
6	October 12	**Philadelphia Eagles**	**L** 16–31	1–5	Giants Stadium	71,051
7	October 19	at San Diego Chargers	**L** 7–44	1–6	San Diego Stadium	50,397
8	October 26	Denver Broncos	**L** 9–14	1–7	Giants Stadium	67,598
9	November 2	at Tampa Bay Buccaneers	**L** 13–30	1–8	Tampa Stadium	68,256
10	November 9	**Dallas Cowboys**	**W** 38–35	2–8	Giants Stadium	68,343
11	November 16	Green Bay Packers	**W** 27–21	3–8	Giants Stadium	76,609
12	November 23	at San Francisco 49ers	**L** 0–12	3–9	Candlestick Park	38,574
13	November 30	St. Louis Cardinals	**L** 7–23	3–10	Giants Stadium	65,852
14	December 7	at Seattle Seahawks	**W** 27–21	4–10	Kingdome	51,617
15	December 13	at **Washington Redskins**	**L** 13–16	4–11	RFK Stadium	44,443
16	December 21	Oakland Raiders	**L** 17–33	4–12	Giants Stadium	61,287

Note: Intra-division opponents are in bold text.

== Season summary ==
=== Week 1: at St. Louis Cardinals ===
Team	1	2	3	4	Total
• Giants	7	7	17	10	41
Cardinals	7	7	14	7	35

- Date: September 7
- Location: Civic Center Busch Memorial Stadium
- Game start: 1:00 p.m. EST
- Game weather: 80 °F (26.7 °C); wind 15 miles per hour (24 km/h; 13 kn)
- TV announcers (CBS): Gary Bender, Tom Brookshier
- Source: Pro-Football-Reference.com

Scoring summary
Q1	STL	Morris 5 yard run (Little kick)	STL 7–0
Q1	NYG	Gray 10 yard pass from Simms (Danelo kick)	Tie 7–7
Q2	NYG	Gray 37 yard pass from Simms (Danelo kick)	NYG 14–7
Q2	STL	Morris 9 yard run (Little kick)	Tie 14–14
Q3	NYG	Danelo 28 yard field goal	NYG 17–14
Q3	STL	Anderson 24 yard run (Little kick)	STL 21–17
Q3	NYG	Perkins 58 yard pass from Simms (Danelo kick)	NYG 24–21
Q3	NYG	Gray 42 yard pass from Simms (Danelo kick)	NYG 31–21
Q3	STL	Marsh 7 yard pass from Hart (Little kick)	NYG 31–28
Q4	NYG	Gray 20 yard pass from Simms (Danelo kick)	NYG 38–28
Q4	STL	Tilley 42 yard pass from Hart (Little kick)	NYG 38–35
Q4	NYG	Danelo 33 yard field goal	NYG 41–35

- Phil Simms 16/31, 280 Yds
- Earnest Gray 9 Rec, 174 Yds

=== Week 10 vs Cowboys ===
Week Ten: Dallas Cowboys (7–2) at New York Giants (1–8)

Quarter	1	2	3	4	Total
Cowboys	7	14	14	0	35
Giants	7	21	0	10	38

at Giants Stadium, East Rutherford, New Jersey

- Date: November 9
- Game time: 1:00 p.m. EST
- Game weather: 44 °F (7 °C)
- Game attendance: 68,343
- Referee: Ben Dreith
- TV announcers (CBS): Frank Glieber and Roger Staubach
- Box Score

Game information

First quarter

- NYG – Earnest Gray 25-yard pass from Phil Simms (Joe Danelo kick). Giants 7–0.
- DAL – Tony Dorsett 1-yard run (Rafael Septien kick). Tie 7–7.

Second quarter

- NYG – Larry Heater 1-yard run (Joe Danelo kick). Giants 14–7.
- DAL – Robert Newhouse 1-yard run (Rafael Septien kick). Tie 14–14.
- NYG – George Martin 4-yard pass from Phil Simms (Joe Danelo kick). Giants 21–14.
- NYG – Leon Perry 1-yard run (Joe Danelo kick). Giants 28–14.
- DAL – Ron Springs 58-yard pass from Danny White (Rafael Septien kick). Giants 28–21.

Third quarter

- DAL – Robert Newhouse 29-yard run (Rafael Septien kick). Tie 28–28.
- DAL – Tony Dorsett 13-yard run (Rafael Septien kick). Cowboys 35–28.

Fourth quarter

- NYG – Tom Mullady 20-yard pass from Phil Simms (Joe Danelo kick). Tie 35–35.
- NYG – Joe Danelo 27-yard field goal, 0:27. Giants 38–35.

Top passers

- DAL – Danny White – 10/23, 155 yards, TD, 5 INT
- NYG – Phil Simms – 18/33, 351 yards, 3 TD, INT

Top rushers

- DAL – Tony Dorsett – 24 rushes, 183 yards, 2 TD
- NYG – Larry Heater – 24 rushes, 69 yards, TD

Top receivers

- DAL – Ron Springs – 1 reception, 58 yards, TD
- NYG – Mike Friede – 7 receptions, 137 yards

- Giants' first win against Dallas since 1974

== Standings ==
NFC East
	W	L	T	PCT	DIV	CONF	PF	PA	STK
Philadelphia Eagles^{(2)}	12	4	0	.750	6–2	9–3	384	222	L1
Dallas Cowboys^{(4)}	12	4	0	.750	6–2	9–3	454	311	W1
Washington Redskins	6	10	0	.375	4–4	5–7	261	293	W3
St. Louis Cardinals	5	11	0	.313	2–6	4–10	299	350	L2
New York Giants	4	12	0	.250	2–6	3–9	249	425	L2

== See also ==
- 1980 NFL season
