= 1980 NFL draft =

National Football League draft

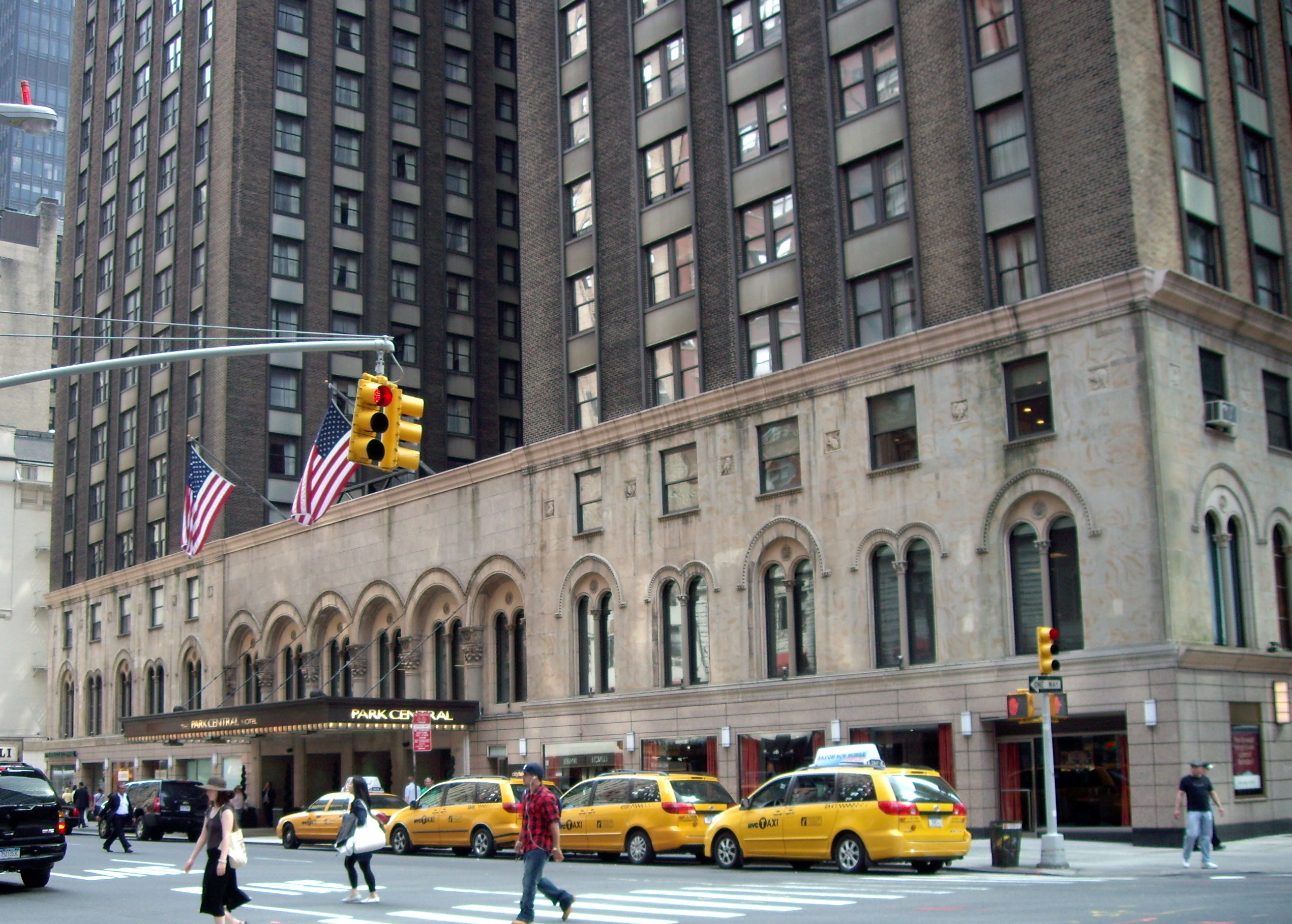
- The former Sheraton Hotel (draft venue), photographed in 2010

General information
- Date: April 29–30, 1980
- Location: New York Sheraton Hotel in New York City, New York
- Network: ESPN

Overview
- 333 total selections in 12 rounds
- League: NFL
- First selection: Billy Sims, RB; Detroit Lions
- Mr. Irrelevant: Tyrone McGriff, G Pittsburgh Steelers
- Most selections (15): New York Jets; Pittsburgh Steelers
- Fewest selections (8): Washington Redskins
- Hall of Famers: 4: OT Anthony Muñoz; WR Art Monk; C Dwight Stephenson; DT Steve McMichael

The 1980 NFL draft was the procedure by which National Football League teams selected amateur college football players. It is officially known as the NFL Annual Player Selection Meeting. The draft was held April 29–30, 1980, at the New York Sheraton Hotel in New York City, New York. The league also held a supplemental draft after the regular draft and before the regular season. With the first overall pick of the draft, the Detroit Lions selected running back Billy Sims.

This draft is notable as the first that the nascent ESPN network (which had first gone on the air seven months earlier) aired in its entirety, and the first to be televised.

== Player selections ==
*	compensatory selection
†	Pro Bowler (Note: Players are identified as Pro Bowlers if they were selected for the Pro Bowl at any time in their career.)
‡	Hall of Famer (Note: Players are identified as a Hall of Famer if they have been inducted into the Pro Football Hall of Fame.)

Positions key
Offense	Defense	Special teams
QB — Quarterback; RB — Running back; FB — Fullback; WR — Wide receiver; TE — Tight end; OL — Offensive lineman; T — Tackle; G — Guard; C — Center	DL — Defensive lineman; DT — Defensive tackle (Note: Includes nose tackle (NT)); DE — Defensive end; EDGE — Edge rusher; LB — Linebacker (Note: Includes middle linebacker (MLB/MIKE), weakside linebacker (WILL), strongside linebacker (SAM), off-ball linebacker, and outside linebacker (OLB)); DB — Defensive back; CB — Cornerback; S — Safety (Note: Includes free safety (FS) and strong safety (SS))	K — Kicker (Note: Also known as a placekicker (PK)); P — Punter; LS — Long snapper; RS — Return specialist (Note: Includes kickoff and punt returners)

Rnd.	Pick	Team	Player	Pos.	College	Notes
1	1	Detroit Lions	Billy Sims ^{†}	RB	Oklahoma	1978 Heisman Trophy Winner
1	2	New York Jets	Lam Jones	WR	Texas	from San Francisco
1	3	Cincinnati Bengals	Anthony Muñoz^{‡}^{†}	T	USC	
1	4	Green Bay Packers	Bruce Clark ^{†}	DE	Penn State	
1	5	Baltimore Colts	Curtis Dickey	RB	Texas A&M	
1	6	St. Louis Cardinals	Curtis Greer	DE	Michigan	
1	7	Atlanta Falcons	Junior Miller ^{†}	TE	Nebraska	
1	8	New York Giants	Mark Haynes ^{†}	CB	Colorado	
1	9	Minnesota Vikings	Doug Martin	DE	Washington	
1	10	Seattle Seahawks	Jacob Green ^{†}	DE	Texas A&M	from Buffalo
1	11	Kansas City Chiefs	Brad Budde	G	USC	
1	12	New Orleans Saints	Stan Brock	T	Colorado	
1	13	San Francisco 49ers	Earl Cooper	RB	Rice	from N.Y. Jets
1	14	New England Patriots	Roland James	CB	Tennessee	
1	15	Oakland Raiders	Marc Wilson	QB	BYU	
1	16	Buffalo Bills	Jim Ritcher ^{†}	G	NC State	from Seattle
1	17	Los Angeles Rams	Johnnie Johnson	CB	Texas	from Cleveland
1	18	Washington Redskins	Art Monk^{‡}^{†}	WR	Syracuse	
1	19	Chicago Bears	Otis Wilson ^{†}	LB	Louisville	
1	20	San Francisco 49ers	Jim Stuckey	DE	Clemson	from Denver via N.Y. Jets
1	21	Miami Dolphins	Don McNeal	CB	Alabama	
1	22	Tampa Bay Buccaneers	Ray Snell	G	Wisconsin	
1	23	Philadelphia Eagles	Roynell Young ^{†}	CB	Alcorn State	
1	24	Baltimore Colts	Derrick Hatchett	S	Texas	from Dallas
1	25	New England Patriots	Vagas Ferguson	RB	Notre Dame	from Houston
1	26	Green Bay Packers	George Cumby	LB	Oklahoma	from San Diego
1	27	Cleveland Browns	Charles White ^{†}	RB	USC	from Los Angeles 1979 Heisman Trophy winner
1	28	Pittsburgh Steelers	Mark Malone	QB	Arizona State	
2	29	Buffalo Bills	Joe Cribbs ^{†}	RB	Auburn	from Detroit
2	30	Minnesota Vikings	Willie Teal	CB	LSU	from San Francisco via Philadelphia
2	31	Cincinnati Bengals	Kirby Criswell	LB	Kansas	
2	32	Baltimore Colts	Ray Donaldson ^{†}	C	Georgia	
2	33	St. Louis Cardinals	Doug Marsh	TE	Michigan	
2	34	Green Bay Packers	Mark Lee	CB	Washington	
2	35	Pittsburgh Steelers	Bob Kohrs	DE	Arizona State	From N.Y. Giants
2	36	Atlanta Falcons	Buddy Curry	LB	North Carolina	
2	37	Buffalo Bills	Gene Bradley	QB	Arkansas State	
2	38	Houston Oilers	Angelo Fields	T	Michigan State	from Kansas City
2	39	San Francisco 49ers	Keena Turner ^{†}	LB	Purdue	from Minnesota
2	40	New York Jets	Darrol Ray	CB	Oklahoma	
2	41	New Orleans Saints	Dave Waymer ^{†}	S	Notre Dame	
2	42	Denver Broncos	Rulon Jones ^{†}	DE	Utah State	from Cleveland
2	43	Oakland Raiders	Matt Millen ^{†}	LB	Penn State	
2	44	Seattle Seahawks	Andre Hines	T	Stanford	
2	45	New England Patriots	Larry McGrew	LB	USC	
2	46	Chicago Bears	Matt Suhey	RB	Penn State	
2	47	New York Jets	Ralph Clayton	WR	Michigan	from Denver
2	48	Miami Dolphins	Dwight Stephenson^{‡}^{†}	C	Alabama	
2	49	Tampa Bay Buccaneers	Kevin House	WR	Southern Illinois	
2	50	Los Angeles Rams	Irv Pankey	T	Penn State	from Washington
2	51	Baltimore Colts	Tim Foley	T	Notre Dame	from Dallas
2	52	Houston Oilers	Daryle Skaugstad	DT	California	
2	53	Philadelphia Eagles	Perry Harrington	RB	Jackson State	
2	54	Cleveland Browns	Cleveland Crosby	DE	Arizona	from San Diego via Los Angeles
2	55	Washington Redskins	Mat Mendenhall	DE	BYU	from Los Angeles
2	56	Pittsburgh Steelers	John Goodman	DE	Oklahoma	
3	57	Detroit Lions	Tom Turnure	C	Washington	
3	58	Los Angeles Rams	Jewerl Thomas	RB	San Jose State	from San Francisco
3	59	Cincinnati Bengals	Ron Horn	DT	Nebraska	
3	60	St. Louis Cardinals	John Sinnott	T	Brown	
3	61	Green Bay Packers	Syd Kitson	G	Wake Forest	
3	62	Detroit Lions	Mike Friede	WR	Indiana	from Baltimore
3	63	Atlanta Falcons	Earl Jones	CB	Norfolk State	
3	64	New York Giants	Myron Lapka	DT	USC	
3	65	San Francisco 49ers	Jim Miller	P	Ole Miss	from Minnesota
3	66	Kansas City Chiefs	James Hadnot	RB	Texas Tech	
3	67	Buffalo Bills	Mark Brammer	TE	Michigan State	
3	68	Minnesota Vikings	Brent Boyd	G	UCLA	from New Orleans
3	69	New York Jets	Lance Mehl ^{†}	LB	Penn State	
3	70	Los Angeles Rams	LeRoy Irvin ^{†}	CB	Kansas	from Oakland
3	71	Buffalo Bills	John Schmeding	G	Boston College	from Seattle
3	72	Cleveland Browns	Cliff Odom	LB	Texas–Arlington	
3	73	New England Patriots	Steve McMichael^{‡}^{†}	DT	Texas	
3	74	Denver Broncos	Larry Carter	DB	Kentucky	
3	75	Miami Dolphins	Bill Barnett	DE	Nebraska	
3	76	Tampa Bay Buccaneers	Scot Brantley	LB	Florida	
3	77	San Francisco 49ers	Craig Puki	LB	Tennessee	
3	78	Dallas Cowboys	Bill Roe	LB	Colorado	from Chicago
3	79	Houston Oilers	Tim Smith	WR	Nebraska	
3	–	Philadelphia Eagles	The Philadelphia Eagles forfeited their 1980 third round pick for holding an illegal tryout			
3	80	Dallas Cowboys	James Jones	RB	Mississippi State	
3	81	St. Louis Cardinals	Charles Baker	LB	New Mexico	from San Diego
3	82	Los Angeles Rams	Phil Murphy	DT	South Carolina State	
3	83	Pittsburgh Steelers	Ray Sydnor	TE	Wisconsin	
4	84	San Francisco 49ers	Ricky Churchman	SS	Texas	
4	85	Detroit Lions	Eric Hipple	QB	Utah State	
4	86	Cincinnati Bengals	William Glass	G	Baylor	
4	87	Green Bay Packers	Fred Nixon	WR	Oklahoma	
4	88	Baltimore Colts	Ray Butler	WR	USC	
4	89	St. Louis Cardinals	Rusty Lisch	QB	Notre Dame	
4	90	New York Giants	Danny Pittman	WR	Wyoming	
4	91	Atlanta Falcons	Jim Laughlin	LB	Ohio State	
4	92	Minnesota Vikings	Dennis Johnson	LB	USC	
4	93	Buffalo Bills	Ervin Parker	LB	South Carolina State	
4	94	Kansas City Chiefs	Dave Klug	LB	Concordia–Moorhead	
4	95	New York Jets	Jesse Johnson	CB	Colorado	
4	96	New Orleans Saints	Mike Jolly	S	Michigan	
4	97	Seattle Seahawks	Terry Dion	DE	Oregon	
4	98	San Francisco 49ers	David Hodge	LB	Houston	
4	99	Cleveland Browns	Ron Crews	DT	UNLV	
4	–	Oakland Raiders	The Oakland Raiders forfeited their 1980 fourth round pick for "evasion of the player limit" and "stashing an unspecified number of players"			
4	100	Miami Dolphins	Elmer Bailey	WR	Minnesota	
4	101	San Diego Chargers	Ed Luther	QB	San Jose State	from Tampa Bay
4	102	Tampa Bay Buccaneers	Larry Flowers	S	Texas Tech	
4	103	Chicago Bears	Arland Thompson	G	Baylor	
4	104	Atlanta Falcons	I. M. Hipp	RB	Nebraska	
4	105	Dallas Cowboys	Kurt Petersen	G	Missouri	
4	106	Houston Oilers	Chris Combs	TE	New Mexico	
4	107	Denver Broncos	Rick Parros	RB	Utah State	
4	108	San Diego Chargers	Bob Gregor	S	Washington State	
4	109	Cleveland Browns	Paul McDonald	QB	USC	from Los Angeles
4	110	Pittsburgh Steelers	Bill Hurley	S	Syracuse	
5	111	Detroit Lions	Mark Streeter	DB	Arizona	
5	112	San Francisco 49ers	Kenneth Times	DT	Southern	
5	113	Cincinnati Bengals	Bryan Hicks	S	McNeese State	
5	114	Kansas City Chiefs	Carlos Carson ^{†}	WR	LSU	
5	115	Kansas City Chiefs	Dan Pensick	DT	Nebraska	
5	116	Cleveland Browns	Elvis Franks	DE	Morgan State	
5	117	Atlanta Falcons	Brad Vassar	LB	Pacific	
5	118	New York Giants	Tony Blount	S	Virginia	
5	119	Buffalo Bills	Jeff Pyburn	DB	Georgia	
5	120	Detroit Lions	Tommie Ginn	C	Arkansas	
5	121	Minnesota Vikings	Doug Paschal	RB	North Carolina	
5	122	Minnesota Vikings	Paul Jones	RB	California	
5	123	New York Jets	Jim Zidd	LB	Kansas	
5	124	New England Patriots	Doug McDougald	N/A	Virginia Tech	
5	125	Oakland Raiders	Kenny Lewis	RB	Virginia Tech	
5	126	Oakland Raiders	John Adams	LB	LSU	
5	127	Seattle Seahawks	Joe Steele	RB	Washington	
5	128	Oakland Raiders	William Bowens	LB	North Alabama	
5	129	Buffalo Bills	Keith Lee	CB	Colorado State	
5	130	Chicago Bears	Paul Tabor	C	Oklahoma	
5	131	Denver Broncos	Mike Harden	S	Michigan	
5	132	Seattle Seahawks	Daniel Jacobs	DE	Winston-Salem State	
5	133	Dallas Cowboys	Gary Hogeboom	QB	Central Michigan	
5	134	Houston Oilers	John Corker	LB	Oklahoma State	
5	135	Philadelphia Eagles	Nate Rivers	RB	South Carolina State	
5	136	Denver Broncos	Laval Short	DT	Colorado	
5	137	Atlanta Falcons	Kenny Johnson	CB	Mississippi State	
5	138	Pittsburgh Steelers	Craig Wolfley	G	Syracuse	
6	139	San Francisco 49ers	Herb Williams	CB	Southern	
6	140	Detroit Lions	Chris Dieterich	T	NC State	
6	141	Cincinnati Bengals	Jo Jo Heath	CB	Pittsburgh	
6	142	St. Louis Cardinals	Bill Acker	DT	Texas	
6	143	Green Bay Packers	Karl Swanke	T	Boston College	
6	144	Baltimore Colts	Chris Foote	C	USC	
6	145	New York Giants	Scott Brunner	QB	Delaware	
6	146	Atlanta Falcons	Mike Davis	DB	Colorado	
6	147	Kansas City Chiefs	Bubba Garcia	WR	UTEP	
6	148	Minnesota Vikings	Ray Yakavonis	DT	East Stroudsburg State	
6	–	Buffalo Bills	The Buffalo Bills forfeited their 1980 sixth round pick after selecting Rod Stewart in the 1979 Supplemental draft			
6	149	New York Jets	George Visger	DT	Colorado	
6	150	New Orleans Saints	Lester Boyd	LB	Kentucky	
6	151	San Diego Chargers	LaRue Harrington	RB	Norfolk State	
6	152	New York Jets	Tom Schremp	DE	Wisconsin	
6	153	Seattle Seahawks	Mark McNeal	DE	Idaho	
6	154	Los Angeles Rams	Mike Guman	RB	Penn State	
6	155	Washington Redskins	Farley Bell	LB	Cincinnati	
6	156	Chicago Bears	Mike Guess	DB	Ohio State	
6	157	Denver Broncos	Keith Bishop ^{†}	G	Baylor	
6	158	Miami Dolphins	Eugene Byrd	WR	Michigan State	
6	159	Cincinnati Bengals	Andrew Melontree	LB	Baylor	
6	160	New England Patriots	Preston Brown	WR	Vanderbilt	
6	161	Philadelphia Eagles	Greg Murtha	T	Minnesota	
6	162	Dallas Cowboys	Timmy Newsome	RB	Winston-Salem State	
6	163	San Diego Chargers	Wayne Hamilton	LB	Alabama	
6	164	Kansas City Chiefs	Larry Heater	RB	Arizona	
6	165	Pittsburgh Steelers	Tunch Ilkin ^{†}	T	Indiana State	
7	166	Detroit Lions	Eddie Murray ^{†}	K	Tulane	
7	167	Cincinnati Bengals	Ron Simpkins	LB	Michigan	
7	168	Cincinnati Bengals	Gary Don Johnson	DT	Baylor	
7	169	Green Bay Packers	Buddy Aydelette	T	Alabama	
7	170	Baltimore Colts	Wes Roberts	DE	TCU	
7	171	St. Louis Cardinals	Ben Apuna	LB	Arizona State	
7	172	Atlanta Falcons	Mike Smith	WR	Grambling State	
7	173	Oakland Raiders	Malcolm Barnwell	WR	Virginia Union	
7	174	Minnesota Vikings	Henry Johnson	LB	Georgia Tech	
7	175	San Diego Chargers	Chuck Loewen	T	South Dakota State	
7	176	Los Angeles Rams	Kirk Collins	CB	Baylor	
7	177	New Orleans Saints	Mike Morucci	RB	Bloomsburg State	
7	178	New York Jets	Bobby Batton	RB	UNLV	
7	179	New York Giants	Darryl Hebert	DB	Oklahoma	
7	180	New England Patriots	Tom Kearns	G	Kentucky	
7	181	New York Giants	Chris Linnin	DE	Washington	
7	182	Houston Oilers	Craig Bradshaw	QB	Utah State	
7	183	Chicago Bears	Emanuel Tolbert	WR	SMU	
7	184	Denver Broncos	John Havekost	G	Nebraska	
7	185	Miami Dolphins	Joe Rose	TE	California	
7	186	Tampa Bay Buccaneers	Jim Leonard	G	Santa Clara	
7	187	Washington Redskins	Melvin Jones	G	Houston	
7	188	Philadelphia Eagles	Terrell Ward	DB	San Diego State	
7	189	Dallas Cowboys	Lester Brown	RB	Clemson	
7	190	New York Jets	Bennie Leverett	RB	Bethune–Cookman	
7	191	San Diego Chargers	Stuart Dodds	P	Montana State	
7	192	Los Angeles Rams	Gerry Ellis	RB	Missouri	
7	193	Pittsburgh Steelers	Nate Johnson	WR	Hillsdale	
8	194	Oakland Raiders	Kenny Hill	S	Yale	
8	195	Baltimore Colts	Ken Walter	T	Texas Tech	
8	196	Cincinnati Bengals	Mark Lyles	RB	Florida State	
8	197	Denver Broncos	Don Coleman	WR	Oregon	
8	198	St. Louis Cardinals	Dupree Branch	DB	Colorado State	
8	199	Green Bay Packers	Tim Smith	S	Oregon State	
8	200	New York Giants	Ken Harris	RB	Alabama	
8	201	Atlanta Falcons	Al Richardson	LB	Georgia Tech	
8	202	Buffalo Bills	Todd Krueger	QB	Northern Michigan	
8	203	Kansas City Chiefs	Sam Stepney	LB	Boston University	
8	204	Seattle Seahawks	Vic Minor	S	Northeast Louisiana	
8	205	New York Jets	Jeff Dziama	LB	Boston College	
8	206	New Orleans Saints	Chuck Evans	LB	Stanford	
8	207	Seattle Seahawks	Jack Cosgrove	C	Pacific	
8	208	New England Patriots	Mike House	TE	Pacific	
8	209	Cleveland Browns	Jeff Copeland	LB	Texas Tech	
8	210	San Francisco 49ers	Bobby Leopold	LB	Notre Dame	
8	211	St. Louis Cardinals	Grant Hudson	DT	Virginia	
8	212	Miami Dolphins	Jeff Allen	CB	UC Davis	
8	213	Tampa Bay Buccaneers	Derrick Goddard	DB	Drake	
8	214	Miami Dolphins	David Woodley	QB	LSU	
8	215	Chicago Bears	Randy Clark	C	Northern Illinois	
8	216	Dallas Cowboys	Larry Savage	LB	Michigan State	
8	217	Houston Oilers	Harold Bailey	WR	Oklahoma State	
8	218	Philadelphia Eagles	Mike Curcio	LB	Temple	
8	219	San Diego Chargers	Curtis Sirmones	RB	North Alabama	
8	220	Los Angeles Rams	Tom Pettigrew	T	Eastern Illinois	
8	221	Pittsburgh Steelers	Ted Walton	DB	UConn	
9	222	Detroit Lions	DeWayne Jett	WR	Hawaii	
9	223	Detroit Lions	Tom Tuinei	DT	Hawaii	
9	224	Cincinnati Bengals	Greg Bright	DB	Morehead State	
9	225	St. Louis Cardinals	Stafford Mays	DE	Washington	
9	226	Green Bay Packers	Kelly Saalfeld	C	Nebraska	
9	227	Baltimore Colts	Mark Bright	RB	Temple	
9	228	Atlanta Falcons	Glen Keller	C	West Texas State	
9	229	New York Giants	Otis Wonsley	RB	Alcorn State	
9	230	Kansas City Chiefs	Tom Donovan	WR	Penn State	
9	231	Buffalo Bills	Kent Davis	DB	Southeast Missouri State	
9	232	Minnesota Vikings	Dennis Mosley	RB	Iowa	
9	233	New Orleans Saints	Frank Mordica	RB	Vanderbilt	
9	234	New York Jets	Joe Peters	DT	Arizona State	
9	235	New England Patriots	Barry Burdet	LB	Oklahoma	
9	236	Cleveland Browns	Roy Dewalt	RB	Texas–Arlington	
9	237	San Francisco 49ers	Dan Hartwig	QB	Cal Lutheran	
9	238	Seattle Seahawks	Jim Swift	T	Iowa	
9	239	Miami Dolphins	Mark Goodspeed	T	Nebraska	
9	240	Tampa Bay Buccaneers	Gerald Carter	WR	Texas A&M	
9	241	Washington Redskins	Lawrence McCullough	WR	Illinois	
9	242	Chicago Bears	Turk Schonert	QB	Stanford	
9	243	Denver Broncos	Greg Bracelin	LB	California	
9	244	Houston Oilers	Ed Harris	RB	Bishop	
9	245	Philadelphia Eagles	Bob Harris	T	Bowling Green	
9	246	Dallas Cowboys	Jackie Flowers	WR	Florida State	
9	247	San Diego Chargers	Steve Whitman	RB	Alabama	
9	248	Los Angeles Rams	George Farmer	WR	Southern	
9	249	Pittsburgh Steelers	Ron McCall	WR	Arkansas–Pine Bluff	
10	250	Pittsburgh Steelers	Woodrow Wilson	DB	NC State	
10	251	Detroit Lions	Donnie Henderson	DB	Utah State	
10	252	Cincinnati Bengals	Sandro Vitiello	K	UMass	
10	253	Green Bay Packers	Jafus White	DB	Texas A&I	
10	254	Baltimore Colts	Larry Stewart	T	Maryland	
10	255	St. Louis Cardinals	Rush Brown	DT	Ball State	
10	256	New York Giants	Joe Sanford	T	Washington	
10	257	Atlanta Falcons	Walt Bellamy	DB	VMI	
10	258	Minnesota Vikings	Kenny Brown	WR	Nebraska	
10	259	Buffalo Bills	Greg Cater	P	Chattanooga	
10	260	New York Jets	Guy Bingham	C	Montana	
10	261	Kansas City Chiefs	Rob Martinovich	T	Notre Dame	
10	262	New Orleans Saints	Tanya Webb	DE	Michigan State	
10	263	Cleveland Browns	Kevin Fiedel	C	San Diego State	
10	264	Oakland Raiders	Walter Carter	DE	Florida State	
10	265	Seattle Seahawks	Ron Essink	T	Grand Valley State	
10	266	New England Patriots	Rom Daniel	C	Georgia Tech	
10	267	Tampa Bay Buccaneers	Andy Hawkins	LB	Texas A&I	
10	268	Washington Redskins	Lewis Walker	RB	Utah	
10	269	Chicago Bears	Willie Stephens	DB	Texas Tech	
10	270	Denver Broncos	Virgil Seay	WR	Troy State	
10	271	Miami Dolphins	Doug Lantz	C	Miami (OH)	
10	272	Miami Dolphins	Ben Long	LB	South Dakota	
10	273	Dallas Cowboys	Matthew Teague	DE	Prairie View A&M	Selection ruled invalid
10	274	Seattle Seahawks	Billy Rivers	WR	Morris Brown	
10	275	Tampa Bay Buccaneers	Brett Davis	RB	UNLV	
10	276	Los Angeles Rams	Bob DiDonato	T	Pittsburgh	
10	277	Pittsburgh Steelers	Ken Fritz	G	Ohio State	
11	278	Detroit Lions	Wayne Smith	CB	Purdue	
11	279	Miami Dolphins	Phil Driscoll	DE	Mankato State	
11	280	Baltimore Colts	Ed Whitley	TE	Kansas State	
11	281	Cincinnati Bengals	Alton Alexis	WR	Tulane	
11	282	St. Louis Cardinals	Delrick Brown	DB	Houston	
11	283	Green Bay Packers	Ricky Skiles	LB	Louisville	
11	284	Atlanta Falcons	Mike Babb	DB	Oklahoma	
11	285	New York Giants	Steve Bernish	DE	South Carolina	
11	286	Buffalo Bills	Joe Gordon	DT	Grambling State	
11	287	Kansas City Chiefs	Dale Markham	T	North Dakota	
11	288	Minnesota Vikings	Sam Harrell	RB	East Carolina	
11	289	New Orleans Saints	George Woodard	RB	Texas A&M	
11	290	New York Jets	James Zachery	LB	Texas A&M	
11	291	Oakland Raiders	Mike Massey	LB	Arkansas	
11	292	Seattle Seahawks	Tali Ena	RB	Washington State	
11	293	New England Patriots	Mike Hubach	P	Kansas	
11	294	Cleveland Browns	Roland Sales	RB	Arkansas	
11	295	Washington Redskins	Mike Matocha	DE	Texas–Arlington	
11	296	Chicago Bears	Chris Judge	DB	TCU	
11	297	Denver Broncos	Phil Farris	WR	North Carolina	
11	298	Philadelphia Eagles	Lee Jukes	WR	NC State	
11	299	Tampa Bay Buccaneers	Terry Jones	DE	Central State (OK)	
11	300	Dallas Cowboys	Gary Padjen	LB	Arizona State	
11	301	Houston Oilers	Eddie Preston	WR	Western Kentucky	
11	302	Philadelphia Eagles	Thomas Brown	DE	Baylor	
11	303	San Diego Chargers	John Singleton	DE	UTEP	
11	304	Los Angeles Rams	Terry Greer	WR	Alabama State	
11	305	Pittsburgh Steelers	Frank Pollard	RB	Baylor	
12	306	Pittsburgh Steelers	Charles Vaclavik	DB	Texas	
12	307	Detroit Lions	Ray Williams	RB	Washington State	
12	308	Cincinnati Bengals	Mike Wright	QB	Vanderbilt	
12	309	St. Louis Cardinals	Tyrone Gray	WR	Washington State	
12	310	Green Bay Packers	James Stewart	DB	Memphis State	
12	311	Baltimore Colts	Randy Bielski	K	Towson State	
12	312	New York Giants	Mike Lansford	K	Washington	
12	313	Atlanta Falcons	Quinn Jones	RB	Tulsa	
12	314	Kansas City Chiefs	Mike Brewington	LB	East Carolina	
12	315	Minnesota Vikings	Thomas Lane	DB	Florida A&M	
12	316	Buffalo Bills	Roger Lapham	TE	Maine	
12	317	New York Jets	David Dumars	DB	Northeast Louisiana	
12	318	New Orleans Saints	Kiser Lewis	LB	Florida A&M	
12	319	Seattle Seahawks	Presnell Gilbert	DB	US International	
12	320	New England Patriots	Jimmy Jordan	QB	Florida State	
12	321	Cleveland Browns	Marcus Jackson	DE	Purdue	
12	322	Oakland Raiders	Calvin Muhammad	WR	Texas Southern	
12	323	Chicago Bears	Bob Fisher	TE	SMU	
12	324	Baltimore Colts	Marvin Sims	RB	Clemson	
12	325	Miami Dolphins	Chuck Stone	G	NC State	
12	326	Tampa Bay Buccaneers	Gene Coleman	DB	Miami (FL)	
12	327	Washington Redskins	Marcene Emmett	DB	North Alabama	
12	328	Houston Oilers	Wiley Pitts	WR	Temple	
12	329	Philadelphia Eagles	Howard Fields	DB	Baylor	
12	330	Dallas Cowboys	Norm Wells	DT	Northwestern	
12	331	San Diego Chargers	Harry Price	WR	McNeese State	
12	332	Los Angeles Rams	Kevin Scanlon	QB	Arkansas	
12	333	Pittsburgh Steelers	Tyrone McGriff	G	Florida A&M	

== Hall of Famers ==
- Anthony Muñoz, offensive tackle from Southern California, taken 1st round 3rd overall by Cincinnati Bengals

Inducted: Professional Football Hall of Fame class of 1998.

- Dwight Stephenson, center from Alabama, taken 2nd round 48th overall by Miami Dolphins

Inducted: Professional Football Hall of Fame class of 1998.

- Art Monk, wide receiver from Syracuse, taken 1st round 18th overall by Washington Redskins

Inducted: Professional Football Hall of Fame class of 2008.

- Steve McMichael, defensive tackle from Texas, taken 3rd round 73rd overall by the New England Patriots.

Inducted: Professional Football Hall of Fame Class of 2024.

== Notable undrafted players ==
†	= Pro Bowler

Original NFL team	Player	Pos.	College	Notes
Atlanta Falcons	Reggie Smith	WR	North Carolina Central	
Baltimore Colts	Ron LaPointe	TE	Penn State	
Buffalo Bills	Steve Carpenter	S	Western Illinois	
Buffalo Bills	Rick Dennison	LB	Colorado State	
Buffalo Bills	John Misko	P	Oregon State	
Cincinnati Bengals	Blake Moore	C	Wooster	
Cincinnati Bengals	John Pointer	LB	Vanderbilt	
Cleveland Browns	Alvin Hall	S	Miami (OH)	
Cleveland Browns	Joel Patten	T	Duke	
Dallas Cowboys	Dextor Clinkscale	S	South Carolina State	
Dallas Cowboys	Anthony Dickerson	LB	SMU	
Dallas Cowboys	Jeff Gossett ^{†}	P	Eastern Illinois	
Dallas Cowboys	Guy Prather	LB	Grambling State	
Dallas Cowboys	John Roveto	K	Southwestern Louisiana	
Dallas Cowboys	Don Smerek	DE	Nevada	
Detroit Lions	Mike Whited	T	Pacific	
Green Bay Packers	Mark Murphy	S	West Liberty	
Houston Oilers	Donnie Echols	TE	Oklahoma State	
Kansas City Chiefs	Paul Dombroski	CB	Linfield	
Kansas City Chiefs	Dino Mangiero	DT	Rutgers	
Kansas City Chiefs	Donovan Rose	CB/S	Hampton	
Los Angeles Rams	Walt Arnold	TE	New Mexico	
Los Angeles Rams	Lucious Smith	CB	Cal State	
Los Angeles Rams	Kurt Sohn	WR	Fordham	
Miami Dolphins	Steve Shull	LB	William & Mary	
New Orleans Saints	Mike Augustyniak	FB	Purdue	
New Orleans Saints	Gordan Banks	WR	Stanford	
New Orleans Saints	Larry Coombs	G	Idaho	
New Orleans Saints	Jeff George	CB	Illinois State	
New Orleans Saints	Steve Parker	DE	Idaho	
New York Giants	Phil Cancik	LB	Northern Arizona	
New York Giants	Mike Dennis	CB	Wyoming	
New York Giants	Curtis McGriff	DT	Alabama	
New York Giants	Leon Perry	RB	Ole Miss	
New York Giants	Steve Tobin	C	Minnesota	
New York Giants	Mike Whittington	LB	Notre Dame	
New York Giants	Kervin Wyatt	LB	Maryland	
New York Jets	Sam Bowers	TE	Fordham	
New York Jets	Gary Dulin	DT	Ohio State	
New York Jets	Jerry Holmes	CB/S	West Virginia	
New York Jets	Jim Luscinski	T	Norwich	
Oakland Raiders	Steve Potter	LB	Virginia	
Philadelphia Eagles	Oudious Lee	NT	Nebraska	
Pittsburgh Steelers	Bill Ring	RB	Brigham Young	
St. Louis Cardinals	Gary Hayes	CB/S	Fresno State	
San Diego Chargers	Rock Richmond	DB	Oregon	
Seattle Seahawks	Greg Feasel	T	Abilene Christian	
Seattle Seahawks	Mike Garrett	P	Georgia	
Seattle Seahawks	Dave Krieg ^{†}	QB	Milton College	
Seattle Seahawks	Will Lewis	RB	Millersville	
Seattle Seahawks	Mark McGrath	WR	Montana State	
Seattle Seahawks	Terry Rennaker	LB	Stanford	
Seattle Seahawks	Kirk Springs	S	Miami (OH)	
Washington Redskins	Jeff Bostic ^{†}	C	Clemson	
Washington Redskins	Rickey Claitt	RB	Bethune–Cookman	
Washington Redskins	Chris Godfrey	G	Michigan	
Washington Redskins	Pat Ogrin	DT	Wyoming	
Washington Redskins	Kevin Turner	LB	Pacific	
