= 1979 Baylor Bears football team =

American college football season

1979 Baylor Bears football

Peach Bowl champion

Peach Bowl, W 24–18 vs. Clemson
- Conference: Southwest Conference

Ranking
- Coaches: No. 15
- AP: No. 14
- Record: 8–4 (5–3 SWC)
- Head coach: Grant Teaff (8th season)
- Offensive coordinator: John O'Hara (1st season)
- Co-offensive coordinator: Duke Christian (1st season)
- Offensive scheme: I formation
- Home stadium: Baylor Stadium

1979 Southwest Conference football standings
| | Conf. | | | | | Overall |
| Team | W | | L | | T | W | | L | | T |
|---|---|---|---|---|---|---|---|---|---|---|
| No. 5 Houston + | 7 | – | 1 | – | 0 | 11 | – | 1 | – | 0 |
| No. 8 Arkansas + | 7 | – | 1 | – | 0 | 10 | – | 2 | – | 0 |
| No. 12 Texas | 6 | – | 2 | – | 0 | 9 | – | 3 | – | 0 |
| No. 14 Baylor | 5 | – | 3 | – | 0 | 8 | – | 4 | – | 0 |
| Texas A&M | 4 | – | 4 | – | 0 | 6 | – | 5 | – | 0 |
| SMU | 3 | – | 5 | – | 0 | 5 | – | 6 | – | 0 |
| Texas Tech | 2 | – | 5 | – | 1 | 3 | – | 6 | – | 2 |
| TCU | 1 | – | 6 | – | 1 | 2 | – | 8 | – | 1 |
| Rice | 0 | – | 8 | – | 0 | 1 | – | 10 | – | 0 |
+ – Conference co-champions; Rankings from AP Poll

The 1979 Baylor Bears football team represented the Baylor University in the 1979 NCAA Division I-A football season. The Bears finished the regular season fourth in the Southwest Conference. A win over Clemson in the Peach Bowl capped the season.

== Schedule ==
| Date | Opponent | Rank | Site | Result | Attendance | Source |
|---|---|---|---|---|---|---|
| September 8 | Lamar* | | Baylor Stadium; Waco, TX | W 20–7 | 25,000 | |
| September 15 | Texas A&M | | Baylor Stadium; Waco, TX (rivalry) | W 17–7 | 48,500 | |
| September 22 | at No. 2 Alabama* | | Legion Field; Birmingham, AL | L 0–45 | 77,512 | |
| September 29 | Texas Tech | | Baylor Stadium; Waco, TX (rivalry) | W 27–17 | 35,800 | |
| October 6 | at No. 6 Houston | | Astrodome; Houston, TX (rivalry) | L 10–13 | 37,142 | |
| October 13 | at SMU | | Texas Stadium; Irving, TX | W 24–21 | 65,101 | |
| October 20 | at Army* | | Michie Stadium; West Point, NY | W 55–0 | 32,591 | |
| October 27 | TCU^{†} | | Baylor Stadium; Waco, TX (rivalry) | W 16–3 | 36,250 | |
| November 10 | at No. 9 Arkansas | No. 17 | Razorback Stadium; Fayetteville, AR | L 20–29 | 43,284 | |
| November 17 | Rice | No. 20 | Baylor Stadium; Waco, TX | W 45–14 | 28,500 | |
| November 24 | at No. 6 Texas | No. 17 | Texas Memorial Stadium; Austin, TX (rivalry) | L 0–13 | 63,288 | |
| December 31 | vs. No. 18 Clemson* | No. 19 | Atlanta–Fulton County Stadium; Atlanta, GA (Peach Bowl) | W 24–18 | 57,321 | |
*Non-conference game; ^{†}Homecoming; Rankings from AP Poll released prior to the game

== Game summaries ==
=== Peach Bowl ===
#19 Baylor vs. #17 Clemson

| Team | 1 | 2 | 3 | 4 | Total |
|---|---|---|---|---|---|
| • Baylor | 0 | 14 | 10 | 0 | 24 |
| Clemson | 7 | 0 | 3 | 8 | 18 |

- Date: December 31
- Location: Atlanta–Fulton County Stadium, Atlanta
- Game attendance: 57,371

Scoring summary
| 1 | CLEM | Brown 1-yard run (Ariri kick) | CLEM 7-0 |
| 2 | BAY | Taylor 3-yard pass from Brannon (Bledsoe kick) | Tied 7-7 |
| 2 | BAY | Holt 24-yard pass from Brannon (Bledsoe kick) | BAY 14-7 |
| 3 | CLEM | Ariri 40-yard field goal | BAY 14-10 |
| 3 | BAY | Bledsoe 29-yard field goal | BAY 17-10 |
| 3 | BAY | Cockrell 7-yard pass from Brannon (Bledsoe kick) | BAY 24-10 |
| 4 | CLEM | McSwain 1-yard run (Lott to McCall pass) | BAY 24-18 |

Freshman DB Kyle Woods, who injured his neck in preseason practice, spoke to the team before the game and was on the sidelines in wheelchair as team wore No. 23 towels as tribute.

== Roster ==
1979 Baylor Bears football team roster
Players
Coaches
Offense

| Pos. | # | Name | Class |
|---|---|---|---|
| RB | 34 | Walter Abercrombie | So |
| OL | 57 | Ron Barnes | Sr |
| OT | 54 | Keith Bishop | Sr |
| QB | 7 | Mike Brannan | Fr |
| TE | 80 | Raymond Cockrell | Jr |
| G | 60 | Frank Ditta | Jr |
| RB | 3 | Dennis Gentry | So |
| G | 79 | Bill Glass | Sr |
| WR | 17 | Robert Holt | Jr |
| TE | 86 | Sam Houston | Fr |
| OT | 72 | Brent Jones | Sr |
| C | 58 | Buzzy Nelson | So |
| FB | 30 | Frank Pollard | Sr |
| WR | 5 | Bo Taylor | Sr |
| OT | 51 | Arland Thompson | Sr |

Defense

| Pos. | # | Name | Class |
|---|---|---|---|
| DE | 90 | Thomas Brown | Sr |
| DL | 78 | Joe Campbell | Jr |
| DB | 42 | Kirk Collins | Sr |
| LB | 53 | Paul Hurst | Sr |
| LB | 46 | Doak Field | Jr |
| CB | 44 | Howard Fields | Sr |
| SS | 16 | Vann McElroy | So |
| DE | 89 | Andrew Melontree | Sr |
| LB | 63 | Mike Singletary | Jr |
| LB | 49 | Lester Ward | Jr |
| DB | 32 | Thomas Earl Young | Jr |

Special teams

| Pos. | # | Name | Class |

Head coach

- Grant Teaff

Coordinators/assistant coaches

Legend

- (C) Team captain
- (S) Suspended
- (I) Ineligible
- Injured
- Redshirt

== Team players drafted into the NFL ==
The following players were drafted into professional football following the season.

| Player | Position | Round | Pick | Franchise |
| William Glass | Guard | 4 | 86 | Cincinnati Bengals |
| Arland Thompson | Guard | 4 | 103 | Chicago Bears |
| Keith Bishop | Guard | 6 | 157 | Denver Broncos |
| Bo Taylor | Running back | | | Tampa Bay |
| Andrew Melontree | Linebacker | 6 | 159 | Cincinnati Bengals |
| Gary Don Johnson | Defensive tackle | 7 | 168 | Cincinnati Bengals |
| Kirk Collins | Defensive back | 7 | 176 | Los Angeles Rams |
| Thomas Brown | Defensive end | 11 | 302 | Philadelphia Eagles |
| Frank Pollard | Running back | 11 | 305 | Pittsburgh Steelers |
| Howard Fields | Defensive back | 12 | 329 | Philadelphia Eagles |

== Awards and honors ==
- Mike Singletary, (All-America) honors
- Mike Singletary, Davey O'Brien Memorial Trophy, awarded to the most outstanding player in the Southwest Conference.
- Mike Singletary was the only college junior to be selected to the All-Southwest Conference Team of the 1970s.
