= 1980 Cotton Bowl Classic =

- 44th Cotton Bowl Classic
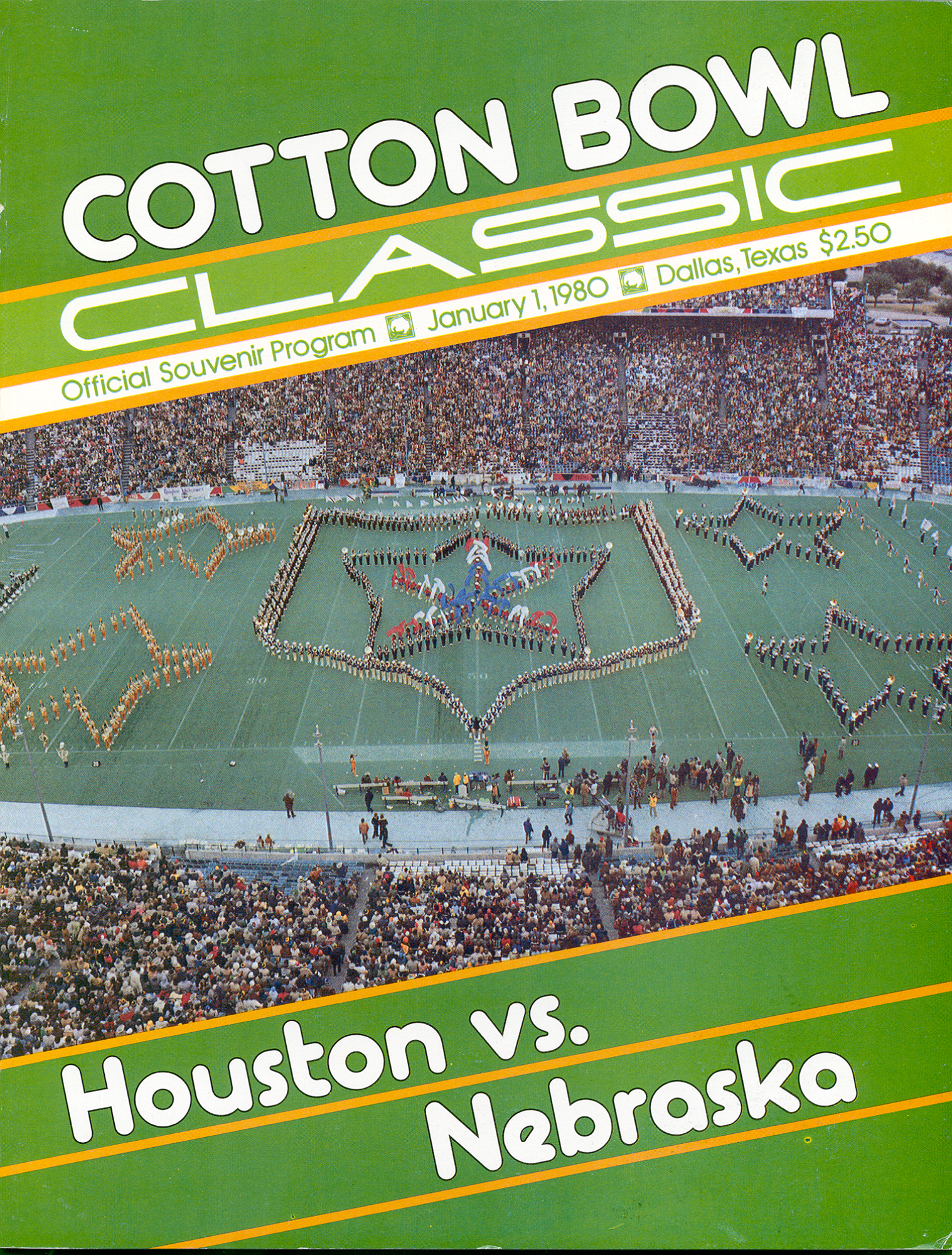
| Nebraska Cornhuskers | Houston Cougars |
| (10–1) | (10–1) |
| Big 8 | SWC |
| 14 | 17 |
| Head coach: Tom Osborne | Head coach: Bill Yeoman |
| AP / Coaches; 7 / 8 | AP / Coaches; 8 / 6 |
| | 1 | 2 | 3 | 4 | Total |
|---|---|---|---|---|---|
| Nebraska | 7 | 0 | 0 | 7 | 14 |
| Houston | 0 | 7 | 0 | 10 | 17 |
- Date: January 1, 1980
- Season: 1979
- Stadium: Cotton Bowl
- Location: Dallas, Texas
- MVP: Terry Elston (Houston QB); David Hodge (Houston LB)
- Favorite: Nebraska by 3½ points
- Referee: Robert Aillet (SEC)
- Attendance: 72,032

United States TV coverage
- Network: CBS
- Announcers: Lindsey Nelson (Play-by-play 1st qtr only), Frank Glieber (Sideline 1st, then play-by-play), and Paul Hornung

The Cotton Bowl in Dallas, Texas, hosted the Cotton Bowl Classic.

The 1980 Cotton Bowl Classic was the 44th edition of the college football bowl game, played at the Cotton Bowl in Dallas, Texas, on Tuesday, January 1. Part of the 1979–80 bowl game season, it matched the seventh-ranked Nebraska Cornhuskers of the Big Eight Conference and the #8 Houston Cougars of the Southwest Conference (SWC). A slight underdog, Houston rallied to win, 17–14.

== Teams ==
=== Nebraska ===
Nebraska was the runner-up in the Big Eight Conference for the fifth time in head coach Tom Osborne's seventh season, after losing to rival Oklahoma to end the regular season. The Huskers were appearing in their first Cotton Bowl in six years and eleventh consecutive bowl game, seven of which were major bowls.

=== Houston ===
The Cougars were co-champions of the Southwest Conference with Arkansas, who they beat midway through the season. While Arkansas was invited to the Sugar Bowl, Houston returned to the Cotton Bowl for the second straight year, their third appearance in four seasons.

== Game summary ==
Televised by CBS, the game kicked off shortly after 1 p.m. CST, as did the Sugar Bowl on ABC. The Dallas weather was fair and 60 °F (16 °C), a vast improvement over the previous year's subzero wind chill.

Nebraska halfback Jarvis Redwine opened the scoring with a nine-yard run late in the first quarter to complete an 85-yard drive. Houston responded midway through the second quarter with their own drive, 71 yards in six plays which ended with a touchdown run by quarterback Terry Elston to tie the game at seven each, the score at halftime.

The third quarter was scoreless. Kenny Hatfield kicked a field goal to give the Cougars a 10–7 lead with 8:25 remaining. But Nebraska recovered a Houston fumble at the 31 and scored six plays later on a six-yard touchdown pass from Jeff Quinn to tight end Jeff Finn to take the lead at 14–10. After the kickoff, Houston started at their own 34 with 3:48 remaining, and Elston drove his team to the Nebraska six with nineteen seconds left. It was fourth and one as Elston snapped the ball, scrambling and throwing through two defenders' hands to Eric Herring in the end zone, to give Houston the lead with twelve seconds left. Nebraska could not work a miracle of their own as the Cougars gained their second Cotton Bowl win in three years.

=== Scoring ===
First quarter

- Nebraska - Jarvis Redwine 9-yard run (Dean Sukup kick)

Second quarter

- Houston - Terry Elston 8-yard run (Kenny Hatfield kick)

Third quarter

No scoring

Fourth quarter

- Houston - Kenny Hatfield 41-yard field goal
- Nebraska - Jeff Finn 6-yard pass from Jeff Quinn (Dean Sukup kick)
- Houston - Eric Herring 6-yard pass from Terry Elston (Kenny Hatfield kick), 0:12 remaining

== Statistics ==
| Statistics | Houston | Nebraska |
|---|---|---|
| First downs | 18 | 13 |
| Rushes–yards | 61–206 | 41–136 |
| Passing yards | 119 | 91 |
| Passes | 9–19–0 | 11–22–1 |
| Total offense | 80–325 | 63–227 |
| Punts–average | 7–42.0 | 10–40.6 |
| Fumbles–lost | 7–3 | 1–1 |
| Turnovers | 3 | 2 |
| Penalties–yards | 2–22 | 7–90 |

== Aftermath ==
Houston climbed to fifth in the final AP poll and Nebraska dropped to ninth.

The Cornhuskers went to bowls for the next eighteen years under Osborne before his retirement. However, they only returned to the Cotton Bowl in 2007.

The Cougars returned five years later but lost. They have not won a Cotton Bowl since 1980.
