= Steve Carpenter (American football) =

American football player (born 1958)

No. 49, 43, 96
- Position: Safety

Personal information
- Born: January 22, 1958 (age 68); Staunton, Illinois, U.S.
- Listed height: 6 ft 2 in (1.88 m)
- Listed weight: 195 lb (88 kg)

Career information
- High school: Edwardsville
- College: Western Illinois
- NFL draft: 1980: undrafted

Career history
- Buffalo Bills (1980)*; New York Jets (1980); St. Louis Cardinals (1981); Calgary Stampeders (1984–1985)
- * Offseason or practice squad member only
- Stats at Pro Football Reference

Steven Carpenter (born January 22, 1958) is an American former professional football player who was a defensive back for the New York Jets and St. Louis Cardinals of the National Football League (NFL). He played college football for the Western Illinois Leathernecks. He also played professionally for the Calgary Stampeders of the Canadian Football League (CFL).
