= 1979 Peach Bowl =

American college football game

- 12th Peach Bowl
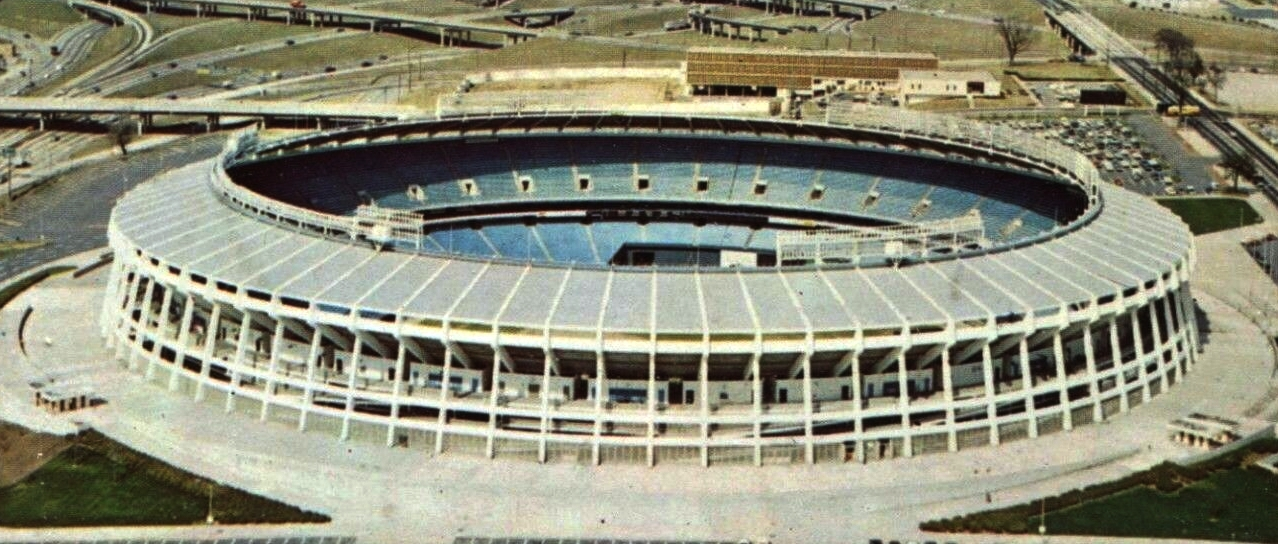
- Atlanta–Fulton County Stadium in Atlanta, Georgia, hosted the Peach Bowl.
Clemson Tigers	Baylor Bears
(8–3)	(7–4)
ACC	SWC
18	24
Head coach: Danny Ford	Head coach: Grant Teaff
AP 19	AP 18
	1	2	3	4	Total
Clemson	7	0	3	8	18
Baylor	0	14	10	0	24
- Date: December 31, 1979
- Season: 1979
- Stadium: Atlanta–Fulton County Stadium
- Location: Atlanta, Georgia
- MVP: QB Mike Brannan (Baylor); DE Andrew Melontree (Baylor)
- Referee: Raymond Bower (CIFOA)
- Attendance: 57,321

United States TV coverage
- Network: CBS
- Announcers: Gary Bender and Sonny Jurgensen

The 1979 Peach Bowl was a college football post-season bowl game that featured the Clemson Tigers and the Baylor Bears.

== Background ==
Clemson had regressed slightly from an 11–1 season the year before, though they did finish at 8-3 to go to a bowl game for the third straight year. As for the Bears, they had finished the previous season at 3–8, but rebounded to win seven regular season games, with their four losses being to ranked teams (Alabama, Houston, Arkansas, and Texas), while finishing fourth in the Southwest Conference. This was their second bowl game in four years. This was the first Peach Bowl appearance for either team as well as the first meeting between these two teams.

== Game summary ==
- Clemson - Brown 1 yard touchdown run (Ariri kick), 6:04, 1st
- Baylor - Taylor 3 yard touchdown pass from Brannan (Bledsoe kick), 14:55, 2nd
- Baylor - Holt 24 yard touchdown pass from Brannan (Bledsoe kick), 12:20, 2nd
- Clemson - Ariri 40 yard field goal, 10:36, 3rd
- Baylor - Bledsoe 29 yard field goal, 8:17, 3rd
- Baylor - Cockrell 7 yard touchdown pass from Elam (Bledsoe kick), 3:43, 3rd
- Clemson - McSwain 1 yard touchdown run (McCall pass from Lott), 0:20, 4th

Baylor had 11 first downs while Clemson had 20. On rushing, the Bears rushed for 62 yards on 45 carries while Clemson had 67 yards on 51 carries. On passing, the bears had 172 yards, while Clemson had 204. Both teams had nine punts, with the average for Baylor being 40.7 yards and Clemson being at 31.5. The Bears lost two of their four fumbles. On penalties, the Bears had four for 30 yards, while the Tigers had 7 for 47 yards.

== Aftermath ==
The Tigers did not go to another Peach Bowl until 1993, while the Bears have not returned since this game.
