= George Visger =

American football player (born 1958)

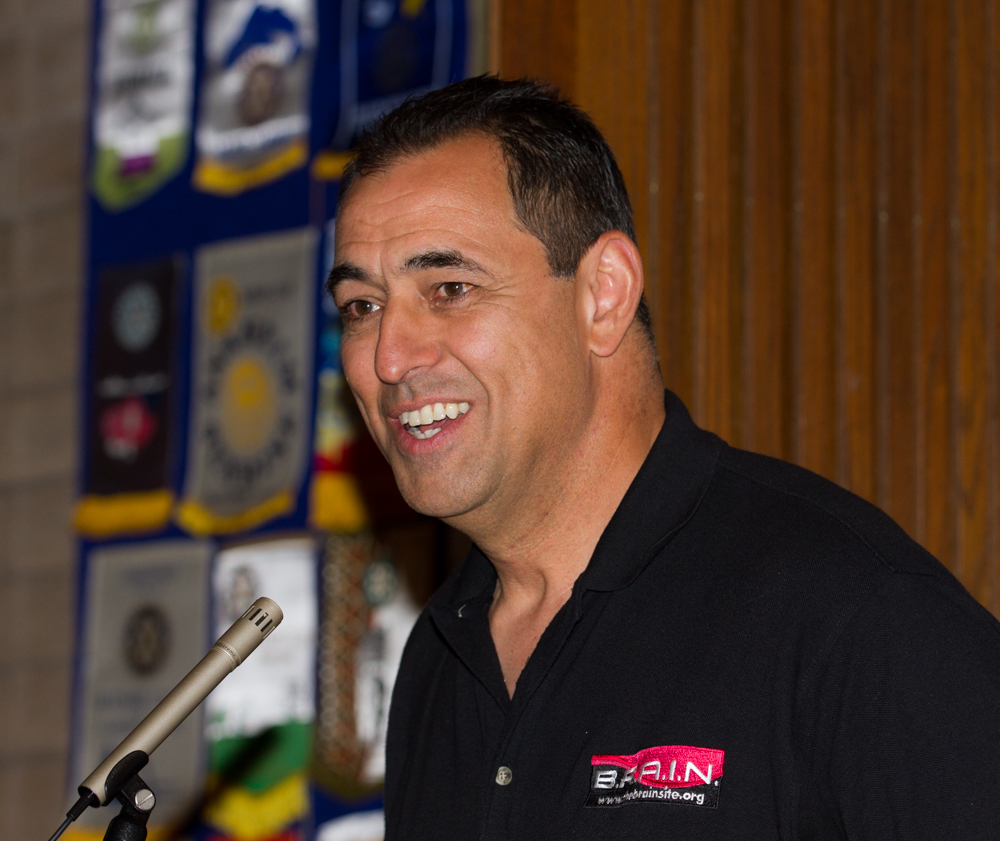
- Visger at Brain Rehabilitation And Injury Network (B.R.A.I.N.) on November 8, 2013

No. 63
- Position: Defensive tackle

Personal information
- Born: September 26, 1958 (age 68); Stockton, California, U.S.
- Listed height: 6 ft 4 in (1.93 m)
- Listed weight: 250 lb (113 kg)

Career information
- College: Colorado
- NFL draft: 1980: 6th round, 149th overall pick

Career history
- New York Jets (1980)*; San Francisco 49ers (1980–1981)
- * Offseason or practice squad member only

Awards and highlights
- Super Bowl champion (XVI)
- Stats at Pro Football Reference

George Anthony Visger (born September 26, 1958) is an American former professional football player who was a defensive tackle for the San Francisco 49ers of the National Football League (NFL). He played college football for the Colorado Buffaloes.

== Early life ==
Visger began playing Pop Warner football at age 11 for the West Stockton Bear Cubs. At age 13, during his 3rd year of Pop Warner, he was hospitalized after knocking himself out in a Bull-In-The-Ring drill. After winning two championships in Pop Warner, he went on to play at A.A. Stagg High in Stockton, CA where they won two championships and went 20-1-1 including 11-0 and ranked #3 in CA during his two years on the varsity. Visger was selected to the 1975 Top 100 High School All-American team.

From 1976 to 1979, Visger attended the University of Colorado on a football scholarship, where he majored in Fisheries Biology and made the traveling squad as a true freshman. Under head coach Bill Mallory, Colorado won the 1976 Big Eight Championship and played Ohio State in the 1977 Orange Bowl. Visger was a three-year starter, earning honorable mention for All Big Eight and the Regiment Award in 1979.

Two weeks before the 1980 draft, Visger unknowingly fractured his sacral 8 vertebrae and played his entire rookie season with a broken back.

== Career ==
=== Early career ===
In 1980, Visger was selected by the New York Jets in the 6th round of the NFL draft, ultimately playing with the San Francisco 49ers in 1980 and 1981. Visger sustained a major concussion in the first quarter of a Dallas game in 1980, yet he played the entire game by clearing his head with smelling salts each time he came off the field.

Early in the following 1981 season, Visger underwent his first knee surgery. Several weeks later, he developed hydrocephalus from concussions and underwent emergency VP shunt brain surgery. Four months after their Super Bowl XVI victory, Visger underwent two additional brain surgeries 10 hours apart and was given last rites. In 1984, he required two additional knee surgeries, including an experimental Gore-Tex ACL transplant to repair damage sustained during the 1981 season.

Visger returned to school to complete his biology degree in 1986. He survived five additional emergency VP Shunt brain surgeries and several gran mal seizures in 1987 while enrolled in Chemistry and Physics courses and earning a Class B General Contractor's license. In 1990, he graduated with a Bachelor of Science degree in Biological Conservation, despite developing dyslexia and major short-term memory deficits from his surgeries and seizure medications. Visger began his career as a wildlife biologist-environmental consultant in 1990 and has now survived nine emergency VP shunt brain surgeries.

=== Post career ===
Visger has become a well-known expert on traumatic brain injuries (TBI). In 2010, he founded The Visger Group, a TBI consulting organization with the goal of raising the awareness of TBI in a variety of venues, including football, injured military veterans, and pediatric groups.

Visger has been featured on NPR, CNN, CBS Evening News, ESPN Outside The Lines, Slate Magazine, and specials in London, England, and Rio de Janeiro, Brazil. He consults directly with Dr. Rich Ellenbogen of the NFL Head, Neck, and Spine Injury Group on rule changes to reduce TBI in football. Many of Visger's suggestions have been implemented to date.

Visger has recommended NFL rule changes to address the issue.

Visger also conducts motivational seminars, is writing a full-length biography, and co-authored an eBook memoir with Irv Muchnick, Out of My Head; My Life In and Out of Football, which was published on January 30, 2012.

Outside the Lines featured Visger chronicling his life after football and getting through his day-to-day routine after his nine brain surgeries. Visger is a well-known advocate for all traumatic brain injury survivors, has presented at Congressional hearings on TBI, the Brain Injury Association annual conferences, and coordinates with the California Community Colleges Disabled Student Program Services and Veterans Resource Centers. Sacramento California, for a congressional hearing about traumatic brain injuries.

Visger is featured in Todd Trigsted's upcoming movie, Gladiators: The Uncertain Future of American Football. Doug Cosbie (Dallas Cowboys 1979–1988) and associates began filming Visger's autobiographic documentary An NFL Brain Injury and Recovery in April 2013.

Visger has spoken about his story and the TBI crisis in the NFL at numerous organizations nationwide including the Brain Rehabilitation And Injury Network (B.R.A.I.N.), a non-profit organization that advocates for adults with brain injuries.
