= Ben Apuna =

American football player (born 1957)

No. 62, 74, 50
- Position: Linebacker

Personal information
- Born: June 26, 1957 (age 69); Honolulu, Hawaii, U.S.
- Listed height: 6 ft 1 in (1.85 m)
- Listed weight: 222 lb (101 kg)

Career information
- High school: Waipahu (Waipahu, Hawaii, U.S.)
- College: Arizona State
- NFL draft: 1980: 7th round, 171st overall pick

Career history
- St. Louis Cardinals (1980); New York Giants (1980); Arizona Wranglers (1983); Washington Federals (1984)

Career NFL statistics
- Fumble recoveries: 1
- Stats at Pro Football Reference

Benjamin Calvin Apuna (born June 26, 1957) is an American former professional football player who was a linebacker in the National Football League (NFL) and United States Football League (USFL). Apuna was born in Honolulu, Hawaii and played college football for Arizona State. He was selected by the St. Louis Cardinals in the seventh round of the 1980 NFL draft and played with the New York Giants for one season in 1980. He also played for the Arizona Wranglers in 1983 and Washington Federals in 1984. In 1981, Apuna filed a lawsuit for $2 million against Arizona State University, claiming that the university signed him up for an extension course that he did not attend.
