= 1979 All-Atlantic Coast Conference football team =

American college football all-star team

The 1979 All-Atlantic Coast Conference football team consists of American football players chosen by various selectors for their All-Atlantic Coast Conference ("ACC") teams for the 1979 college football season. Selectors in 1979 included the Associated Press (AP).

== Offensive selections ==
=== Split Ends ===
- Wayne Baumgardner, Wake Forest (AP)

=== Tackles ===
- Steve Junkmann, North Carolina (AP)
- Larry Stewart, Maryland (AP)

=== Guards ===
- Jeff Bostic, Clemson (AP)
- Chris Dieterich, NC State (AP)

=== Centers ===
- Jim Ritcher, NC State (AP)

=== Tight ends ===
- Mike Chatham, North Carolina (AP)

=== Quarterbacks ===
- Jay Venuto, Wake Forest (AP)

=== Running backs ===
- James McDougald, Wake Forest (AP)
- Charles Wysocki, Maryland (AP)
- Tommy Vigorito, Virginia (AP)

== Defensive selections ==
=== Defensive linemen ===
- Jim Stuckey, Clemson (AP)
- James "Quick" Parker, Wake Forest (AP)
- Steve Durham, Clemson (AP)
- Simon Gupton, NC State (AP)
- Steve Potter, Virginia (AP)

=== Linebackers ===
- Buddy Curry, North Carolina (AP)
- Bubba Brown, Clemson (AP)

=== Defensive backs ===
- Woodrow Wilson, NC State (AP)
- Ricky Barden, North Carolina (AP)
- Rex Varn, Clemson (AP)
- Tony Blount, Virginia (AP)

== Special teams ==
=== Placekickers ===
- Dale Castro, Maryland (AP)

=== Punters ===
- David Sims, Clemson (AP)

== Key ==
AP = Associated Press

== See also ==
1979 College Football All-America Team
