= 1979 Texas A&M Aggies football team =

American college football season

1979 Texas A&M Aggies football
- Conference: Southwest Conference
- Record: 6–5 (4–4 SWC)
- Head coach: Tom Wilson (2nd season)
- Defensive coordinator: R. C. Slocum (1st season)
- Home stadium: Kyle Field

1979 Southwest Conference football standings
	Conf.					Overall
Team	W		L		T	W		L		T
No. 5 Houston +	7	–	1	–	0	11	–	1	–	0
No. 8 Arkansas +	7	–	1	–	0	10	–	2	–	0
No. 12 Texas	6	–	2	–	0	9	–	3	–	0
No. 14 Baylor	5	–	3	–	0	8	–	4	–	0
Texas A&M	4	–	4	–	0	6	–	5	–	0
SMU	3	–	5	–	0	5	–	6	–	0
Texas Tech	2	–	5	–	1	3	–	6	–	2
TCU	1	–	6	–	1	2	–	8	–	1
Rice	0	–	8	–	0	1	–	10	–	0
+ – Conference co-champions; Rankings from AP Poll

The 1979 Texas A&M Aggies football team represented Texas A&M University in the 1979 NCAA Division I-A football season as a member of the Southwest Conference (SWC). The Aggies were led by head coach Tom Wilson in his second season and finished with a record of six wins and five losses (6–5 overall, 4–4 in the SWC).

== Schedule ==
Date	Opponent	Rank	Site	Result	Attendance	Source
September 8	BYU*	No. 14	Rice Stadium; Houston, TX	L 17–18	40,000	
September 15	at Baylor		Baylor Stadium; Waco, TX (rivalry)	L 7–17	48,500	
September 22	at No. 6 Penn State*		Beaver Stadium; University Park, PA	W 27–14	77,575	
September 29	at Memphis State*		Liberty Bowl Memorial Stadium; Memphis, TN	W 17–7	38,477	
October 6	at Texas Tech		Jones Stadium; Lubbock, TX (rivalry)	L 20–21	52,468	
October 13	No. 7 Houston		Kyle Field; College Station, TX	L 14–17	59,545	
October 27	at Rice		Rice Stadium; Houston, TX	W 41–15	43,000	
November 3	SMU		Kyle Field; College Station, TX	W 47–14	58,690	
November 17	No. 8 Arkansas		Kyle Field; College Station, TX (rivalry)	L 10–22	62,648	
November 24	at TCU		Amon G. Carter Stadium; Fort Worth, TX (rivalry)	W 30–7	27,229	
December 1	No. 6 Texas		Kyle Field; College Station, TX (rivalry)	W 13–7	69,017	
*Non-conference game; Rankings from AP Poll released prior to the game

== Game summaries ==
=== Vs. BYU ===
BYU Cougars (0–0) at #14 Texas A&M Aggies (0–0)

Quarter	1	2	3	4	Total
BYU	0	3	7	8	18
Texas A&M	7	0	7	3	17

at Rice Stadium, Houston, Texas

- Date: September 8, 1979
- Game attendance: 40,000
- Box Score

Game information

First quarter

- A&M – David Brothers 1-yard run (David Hardy kick). Texas A&M 7–0.

Second quarter

- BYU – Brent Johnson 27-yard field goal. Texas A&M 7–3.

Third quarter

- A&M – Mike Mosley 7-yard run (David Hardy kick). Texas A&M 14–3.
- BYU – Dan Plater 20-yard pass from Marc Wilson (Brent Johnson kick). Texas A&M 14–10.

Fourth quarter

- A&M – David Hardy 37-yard field goal. Texas A&M 17–16.
- BYU – Clay Brown 3-yard pass from Marc Wilson (pass good), 0:52. BYU 18–17.

Top passers

- BYU – Marc Wilson – 17/35, 165 yards, 2 TD, 3 INT
- A&M – Mike Mosley – 9/13, 125 yards

Top rushers

- BYU – Homer Jones – 7 rushes, 53 yards
- A&M – Curtis Dickey – 28 rushes, 148 yards

Top receivers

- BYU – Dan Plater – 3 receptions, 49 yards, TD
- A&M – Gerald Carter – 6 receptions, 104 yards

The game was played at Rice Stadium because Kyle Field was being renovated.

== Personnel ==
1979 Texas A&M Aggies football team roster
Players
Coaches
Offense

Pos.	#	Name	Class
WR	24	Gerald Carter	Sr
RB	22	Curtis Dickey	Sr
QB	16	Gary Kubiak	Fr
QB	11	Mike Mosley	Jr
G	79	Ed Pustejovsky	Sr

Defense

Pos.	#	Name	Class
DB	21	Dan Davis	So
LB	63	Doug Carr	Jr
DE	77	Jacob Green	Sr

Special teams

Pos.	#	Name	Class
K	3	David Hardy	Fr

Head coach

- Tom Wilson

Coordinators/assistant coaches

Legend

- (C) Team captain
- (S) Suspended
- (I) Ineligible
- Injured
- Redshirt
