= Phil Cancik =

American football player (born 1957)

No. 61, 56
- Position: Linebacker

Personal information
- Born: April 19, 1957; South Bend, Indiana, U.S.
- Died: April 13, 2026 (aged 68); Buckeye, Arizona, U.S.
- Listed height: 6 ft 1 in (1.85 m)
- Listed weight: 228 lb (103 kg)

Career information
- High school: Scottsdale (AZ) Chaparral
- College: Northern Arizona
- NFL draft: 1980: undrafted

Career history
- New York Giants (1980); Kansas City Chiefs (1981); Denver Gold (1983)

Career NFL statistics
- Fumble recoveries: 1
- Stats at Pro Football Reference

Phil Cancik (born April 19, 1957) is an American former professional football player who was a linebacker in the National Football League (NFL) and United States Football League (USFL). He played college football for the Northern Arizona Lumberjacks. He played in the NFL for the New York Giants in 1980 and for the Kansas City Chiefs in 1981.
