= Larry Coombs =

American football player (born 1957)

No. 57
- Position: Guard

Personal information
- Born: August 9, 1957 (age 69); Arcata, California, U.S.
- Listed height: 6 ft 4 in (1.93 m)
- Listed weight: 260 lb (118 kg)

Career information
- High school: Timberline (Lacey, Washington)
- College: Idaho
- NFL draft: 1980: undrafted

Career history
- Los Angeles Rams (1980)*; New Orleans Saints (1980); Green Bay Packers (1981)*
- * Offseason or practice squad member only

Career NFL statistics
- Games played: 1
- Stats at Pro Football Reference

Lawrence Mahlon Coombs (born August 9, 1957) is an American former professional football player who was a guard for the New Orleans Saints of the National Football League (NFL) in 1980. He played college football for the Idaho Vandals.
