= 1980 Sugar Bowl =

American college football game

- 46th Sugar Bowl
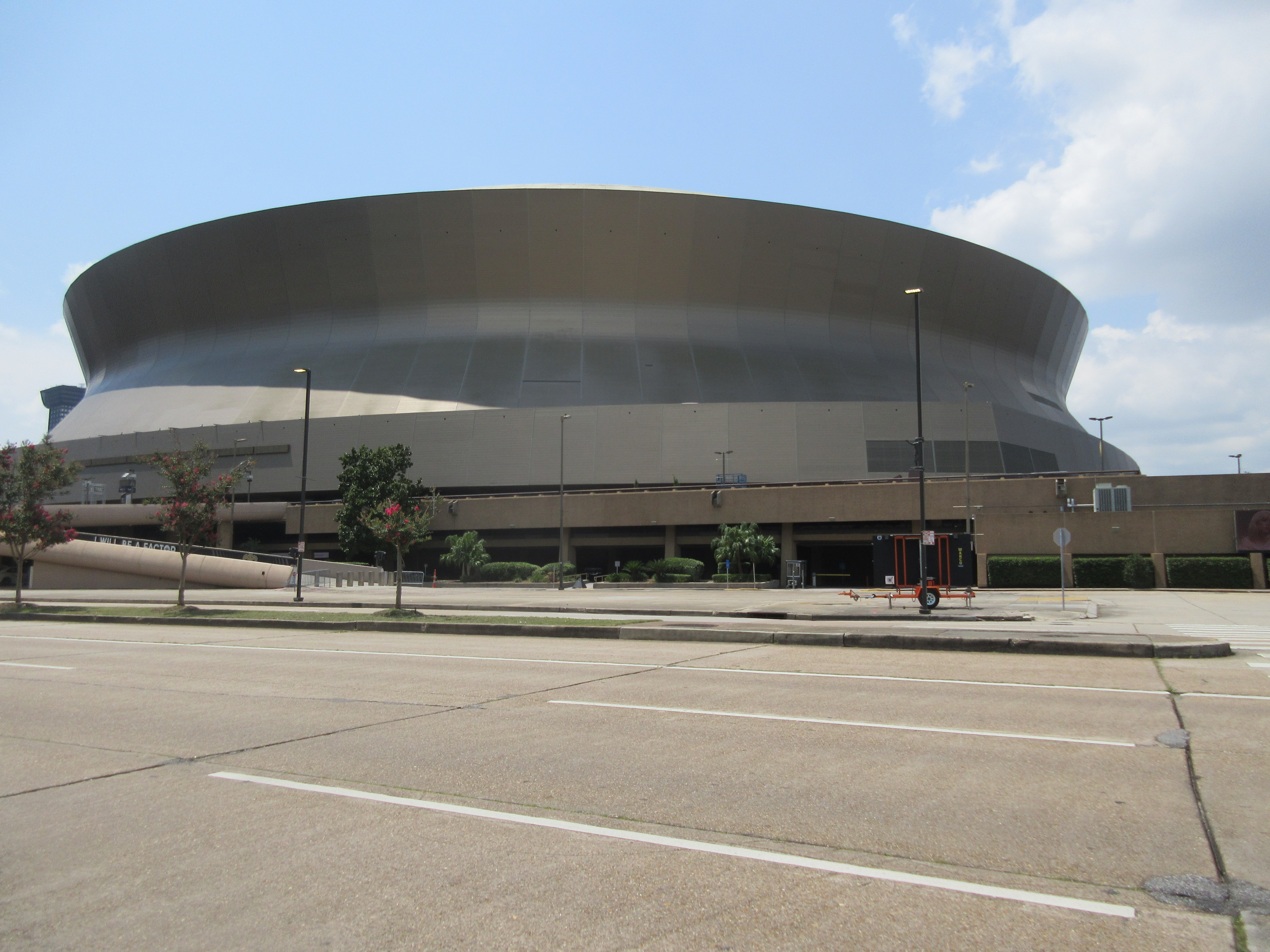
- The Louisiana Superdome in New Orleans, Louisiana, hosted the Sugar Bowl.
Alabama Crimson Tide	Arkansas Razorbacks
(11–0)	(10–1)
SEC	SWC
24	9
Head coach: Bear Bryant	Head coach: Lou Holtz
AP / Coaches; 2 / 1	AP / Coaches; 6 / 7
	1	2	3	4	Total
Alabama	14	3	0	7	24
Arkansas	3	0	6	0	9
- Date: January 1, 1980
- Season: 1979
- Stadium: Louisiana Superdome
- Location: New Orleans, Louisiana
- MVP: Major Ogilvie (Alabama RB)
- Favorite: Alabama by 6½ to 10 points
- Referee: Bill Jennings (Big 8)
- Attendance: 77,484

United States TV coverage
- Network: ABC
- Announcers: Keith Jackson and Ara Parseghian

The 1980 Sugar Bowl was the 46th edition of the college football bowl game, played at the Louisiana Superdome in New Orleans, Louisiana, on Tuesday, January 1. Part of the 1979–80 bowl game season, it matched the undefeated and second-ranked Alabama Crimson Tide of the Southeastern Conference (SEC) and the #6 Arkansas Razorbacks of the Southwest Conference (SWC). Favored Alabama won 24–9, and gained their third national championship of the decade.

== Teams ==
=== Alabama ===
Alabama entered the game undefeated, and had won two national championships already in the decade, in 1973 and 1978. Three of their conference victories in 1979 were by close margins, including a 3–0 win at LSU.

=== Arkansas ===
Led by head coach Lou Holtz, the Razorbacks entered the game at 10–1, sharing the SWC title with 1979 Houston Cougars and the Texas Longhorns. Greg Kolenda was an All-American offensive tackle and quarterback Kevin Scanlon was the Southwest Conference Player of the Year. The Hogs' defense gave up 9.8 points per game on the year, the sixth-best scoring defense in Division I.

== Game summary ==
The game kicked off shortly after 1 p.m. CST, televised by ABC, at the same time as the Cotton Bowl on CBS.

Arkansas scored first in the first quarter, on a 34-yard Ish Ordonez field goal, to give the Razorbacks a 3–0 advantage. Alabama running back Major Ogilvie scored on touchdown runs of 22 and 1 yard and Alabama led 14–3 at the end of the first quarter. In the second quarter, Alan McElroy kicked a 25-yard field goal for the Crimson Tide, and they held a 17–3 advantage at halftime.

In the third quarter, Kevin Scanlon of Arkansas threw a 3-yard touchdown pass to Robert Farrell and the score tightened to 17–9. In the fourth quarter, Steve Whitman scored on a 12-yard run as Alabama won by a 24–9 margin. Ogilvie was named Sugar Bowl MVP. He rushed for a touchdown in three consecutive Sugar Bowls, all Crimson Tide victories.

Scoring summary

Quarter	Time	Drive			Team	Scoring information	Score	
Quarter	Time	Plays	Yards	TOP	Team	Scoring information	ALA	ARK
1	12:54		3	8	ARK	34-yard field goal by Ish Ordonez	0	3
1	6:37		82	7	ALA	Major Ogilvie 22-yard touchdown run, Alan McElroy kick good	7	3
1	3:48		22	4	ALA	Major Ogilvie 1-yard touchdown run, Alan McElroy kick good	14	3
2	0:25				ALA	25-yard field goal by Alan McElroy	17	3
3	11:37		80	11	ARK	Robert Farrell 3-yard touchdown reception from Kevin Scanlon, 2-point run no good	17	9
4	8:59		98	9	ALA	Steve Whitman 12-yard touchdown run, Alan McElroy kick good	24	9
"TOP" = time of possession. For other American football terms, see Glossary of American football.							24	9

== Statistics ==
Statistics	Alabama	Arkansas
First downs	18	21
Rushing yards	53–284	41–97
Passing yards	70	245
Passing	4–7–2	22–40–2
Total offense	60–354	81–342
Punts–average	8–36.2	7–36.2
Fumbles–lost	1–1	1–1
Turnovers	3	3
Penalties–yards	7–61	1–15

== Aftermath ==
Later in the day at the Rose Bowl, Ohio State was defeated 17–16 by USC. For the first time since 1964, Alabama was voted to the top spot in both final polls. It was the Tide's first perfect season since 1966.
