= 1979 TCU Horned Frogs football team =

American college football season

1979 TCU Horned Frogs football
- Conference: Southwest Conference
- Record: 2–8–1 (1–6–1 SWC)
- Head coach: F. A. Dry (3rd season)
- Offensive scheme: Pro-style
- Defensive coordinator: Bob Junko (4th season)
- Base defense: 4–3
- Home stadium: Amon G. Carter Stadium

1979 Southwest Conference football standings
	Conf.					Overall
Team	W		L		T	W		L		T
No. 5 Houston +	7	–	1	–	0	11	–	1	–	0
No. 8 Arkansas +	7	–	1	–	0	10	–	2	–	0
No. 12 Texas	6	–	2	–	0	9	–	3	–	0
No. 14 Baylor	5	–	3	–	0	8	–	4	–	0
Texas A&M	4	–	4	–	0	6	–	5	–	0
SMU	3	–	5	–	0	5	–	6	–	0
Texas Tech	2	–	5	–	1	3	–	6	–	2
TCU	1	–	6	–	1	2	–	8	–	1
Rice	0	–	8	–	0	1	–	10	–	0
+ – Conference co-champions; Rankings from AP Poll

The 1979 TCU Horned Frogs football team represented Texas Christian University (TCU) in the 1979 NCAA Division I-A football season. The Horned Frogs finished the season 2–8–1 overall and 1–6–1 in the Southwest Conference. The team was coached by F. A. Dry, in his third year as head coach. The Frogs played their home games in Amon G. Carter Stadium, which is located on campus in Fort Worth, Texas.

== Schedule ==
Date	Opponent	Site	Result	Attendance	Source
September 15	No. 20 SMU	Amon G. Carter Stadium; Fort Worth, TX (rivalry)	L 7–27	18,732	
September 22	Tulane*	Amon G. Carter Stadium; Fort Worth, TX	L 19–33	15,208	
September 29	UT Arlington*	Amon G. Carter Stadium; Fort Worth, TX	L 14–21	20,212	
October 6	No. 13 Arkansas	Amon G. Carter Stadium; Fort Worth, TX	L 13–16	25,317	
October 13	at Rice	Rice Stadium; Houston, TX	W 17–7	12,000	
October 20	at Tulsa*	Skelly Field; Tulsa, OK	W 24–17	20,000	
October 27	at Baylor	Baylor Stadium; Waco, TX (rivalry)	L 3–16	36,250	
November 3	Houston	Amon G. Carter Stadium; Fort Worth, TX	L 10–21	25,412	
November 10	at Texas Tech	Jones Stadium; Lubbock, TX (rivalry)	T 3–3	40,091	
November 17	at No. 6 Texas	Texas Memorial Stadium; Austin, TX (rivalry)	L 10–35	61,597	
November 24	Texas A&M	Amon G. Carter Stadium; Fort Worth, TX (rivalry)	L 7–30	27,229	
*Non-conference game; Rankings from AP Poll released prior to the game

== Roster ==
1979 TCU Horned Frogs football team roster
Players
Coaches
Offense

Pos.	#	Name	Class
RB	6	Jimmy Allen	Sr
TE	81	Brad Bowen	Sr
WR	1	Phil Epps	So
C	50	Eddie Grimes	Jr
OL	51	Frank Hartman
G	63	Donald Ray Richard	So
OT	70	Bobby Richardson	Jr
RB	7	Craig Richardson
QB	10	Steve Stamp	So
OT	79	Dudley Stephenson
WR	11	Bobby Stewart	Jr
OT	67	Steve Wilson	So

Defense

Pos.	#	Name	Class
DB	28	Steve Barnes
DB	26	Ray Berry
LB	36	Mike Dry	So
DB	21	Al Futrell
DB	27	Chris Judge	Sr
LB	52	Kevin Moody
LB	37	Kelvin Newton	Jr
DT	78	Wes Roberts	Sr

Special teams

Pos.	#	Name	Class

Head coach

- F. A. Dry

Coordinators/assistant coaches

Legend

- (C) Team captain
- (S) Suspended
- (I) Ineligible
- Injured
- Redshirt
