= 1979 SMU Mustangs football team =

American college football season

1979 SMU Mustangs football
- Conference: Southwest Conference
- Record: 5–6 (3–5 SWC)
- Head coach: Ron Meyer (4th season)
- Offensive scheme: Wishbone
- Defensive coordinator: Steve Sidwell (4th season)
- Base defense: 3–4
- Home stadium: Texas Stadium

1979 Southwest Conference football standings
	Conf.					Overall
Team	W		L		T	W		L		T
No. 5 Houston +	7	–	1	–	0	11	–	1	–	0
No. 8 Arkansas +	7	–	1	–	0	10	–	2	–	0
No. 12 Texas	6	–	2	–	0	9	–	3	–	0
No. 14 Baylor	5	–	3	–	0	8	–	4	–	0
Texas A&M	4	–	4	–	0	6	–	5	–	0
SMU	3	–	5	–	0	5	–	6	–	0
Texas Tech	2	–	5	–	1	3	–	6	–	2
TCU	1	–	6	–	1	2	–	8	–	1
Rice	0	–	8	–	0	1	–	10	–	0
+ – Conference co-champions; Rankings from AP Poll

The 1979 SMU Mustangs football team represented Southern Methodist University (SMU) as a member of the Southwest Conference (SWC) during the 1979 NCAA Division I-A football season. Led by fourth-year head coach Ron Meyer, the Mustangs compiled an overall record 5–6 with a mark of 3–5 in conference play, placing sixth in the SWC.

== Schedule ==
Date	Opponent	Rank	Site	Result	Attendance	Source
September 8	Rice		Texas Stadium; Irving, TX (rivalry)	W 35–17	60,217	
September 15	at TCU	No. 20	Amon G. Carter Stadium; Fort Worth, TX (rivalry)	W 27–7	18,732	
September 22	North Texas State*	No. 18	Texas Stadium; Irving, TX (rivalry)	W 20–9	57,923	
September 29	at Tulane*	No. 19	Louisiana Superdome; New Orleans, LA	L 17–24	42,563	
October 13	Baylor		Texas Stadium; Irving, TX	L 21–24	65,101	
October 20	at No. 5 Houston		Houston Astrodome; Houston, TX (rivalry)	L 10–37	43,409	
October 27	No. 9 Texas		Texas Stadium; Irving, TX	L 6–30	53,327	
November 3	at Texas A&M		Kyle Field; College Station, TX	L 14–47	58,690	
November 10	at Wichita State*		Cessna Stadium; Wichita, KS	W 34–0	6,110	
November 17	Texas Tech		Texas Stadium; Irving, TX	W 35–10	42,226	
November 24	at No. 7 Arkansas		War Memorial Stadium; Little Rock, AR	L 7–31	54,718	
*Non-conference game; Rankings from AP Poll released prior to the game

== Roster ==
1979 SMU Mustangs football team roster
Players
Coaches
Offense

Pos.	#	Name	Class
RB	19	Eric Dickerson	Fr
TE	87	Bob Fisher	Sr
QB	10	Mike Ford	Jr
OL	77	Perry Hartnett	So
RB	32	Craig James	Fr
OL	71	Mike Jusko	Jr
OL	53	Randy Katz	Sr
OL	67	Mike Mason	Jr
OL	50	Lance Pederson	Jr
OL	76	Lee Spivey	Jr
QB	12	Jim Bob Taylor	Fr
WR	21	Emanuel Tolbert	Sr

Defense

Pos.	#	Name	Class
DL	75	Harvey Armstrong	So
DB	27	Charles Bruton	Jr
DT	74	Michael Carter	Fr
DL	99	Eric Ferguson	So
DB	9	Mark Gibson	Jr
DL	80	Byron Hunt	Jr
DL	61	Charles Hunt	Sr
DL		Jerry Kovar	So
DB	20	James Mobley	So
DB	34	John Simmons	Jr
DL	95	John Wells	So

Special teams

Pos.	#	Name	Class
K	1	Eddie Garcia	So

Head coach

- Ron Meyer

Coordinators/assistant coaches

Legend

- (C) Team captain
- (S) Suspended
- (I) Ineligible
- Injured
- Redshirt

== Team players in the NFL ==
Player	Position	Round	Pick	NFL club
Emanuel Tolbert	Wide receiver	7	183	Chicago Bears
Bob Fisher	Tight end	12	323	Chicago Bears
