= John Sinnott (American football) =

Irish American football player (born 1958)

No. 79
- Position: Offensive tackle

Personal information
- Born: April 18, 1958 (age 68); Wexford, Ireland
- Listed height: 6 ft 4 in (1.93 m)
- Listed weight: 275 lb (125 kg)

Career information
- High school: Dedham (MA)
- College: Brown
- NFL draft: 1980: 3rd round, 60th overall pick

Career history
- St. Louis Cardinals (1980)*; New York Giants (1980-1981); Baltimore Colts (1982)
- * Offseason or practice squad member only

Awards and highlights
- Second-team All-East (1979)

Career NFL statistics
- Games played: 9
- Games started: 7
- Stats at Pro Football Reference

John Desmond Sinnott (born April 18, 1958) is an Irish former professional American football offensive tackle in the National Football League (NFL). He was selected by the St. Louis Cardinals in the third round of the 1980 NFL draft. Sinnott played college football at Brown. He attended Dedham High School and was an inaugural member of the Dedham High School Athletic Hall of Fame.
