= Kervin Wyatt =

American football player (born 1957)

No. 99/61
- Position: Offensive lineman/linebacker

Personal information
- Born: October 17, 1957 (age 69); Washington, D.C., U.S.
- Listed height: 6 ft 1 in (1.85 m)
- Listed weight: 235 lb (107 kg)

Career information
- High school: Potomac (Oxon Hill, Maryland)
- College: Maryland
- NFL draft: 1980: undrafted

Career history
- New York Giants (1980–1982)

Career NFL statistics
- Games played: 4
- Games started: 3
- Stats at Pro Football Reference

Kervin Doran Wyatt (born October 17, 1957) is an American former professional football player who was an offensive lineman and linebacker for one season in the National Football League (NFL) with the New York Giants. He played college football for the Maryland Terrapins and went undrafted in 1980.

== Early life and education ==
Wyatt was born on October 17, 1957, in Washington, D.C. He attended Potomac High School in Maryland, before playing college football at the University of Maryland. Wyatt originally played at offensive lineman. He was a varsity member in all four years at the school.

== Professional career ==
Despite having never played the position before, Wyatt was signed by the New York Giants as a linebacker following the 1980 NFL draft. He was injured in a scrimmage against the New England Patriots on August 1, and subsequently placed on injured reserve. He was activated prior to their game against the St. Louis Cardinals, following an injury to John Skorupan. Wyatt appeared in the final four games of the season, starting three. He injured his knee in 1981 and spent the entire year on injured reserve, before being released in June 1982.
