= Steve Tobin (American football) =

American football player (born 1957)

No. 52
- Position: Center

Personal information
- Born: March 29, 1957 (age 69); Breckenridge, Minnesota, U.S.
- Listed height: 6 ft 4 in (1.93 m)
- Listed weight: 258 lb (117 kg)

Career information
- High school: Moorhead
- College: Minnesota
- NFL draft: 1980: undrafted

Career history
- New York Giants (1980)
- Stats at Pro Football Reference

Steven Arthur Tobin (born March 29, 1957) is an American former professional football player who was a center for the New York Giants of the National Football League (NFL). He played college football for the Minnesota Golden Gophers.
