= Arland Thompson =

American football player (born 1957)

No. 61, 71, 67, 58
- Position: Guard

Personal information
- Born: September 19, 1957; Lockney, Texas, U.S.
- Listed height: 6 ft 4 in (1.93 m)
- Listed weight: 265 lb (120 kg)

Career information
- High school: Plainview (Plainview, Texas)
- College: Baylor
- NFL draft: 1980: 4th round, 103rd overall pick

Career history
- Chicago Bears (1980)*; Denver Broncos (1980); Green Bay Packers (1981); Baltimore Colts (1982); Denver Gold (1983); San Antonio Gunslingers (1984–1985); Minnesota Vikings (1986)*; Kansas City Chiefs (1987); Detroit Drive (1988)
- * Offseason or practice squad member only

Awards and highlights
- ArenaBowl champion (1988)

Career NFL statistics
- Games played: 17
- Games started: 5
- Fumble recoveries: 1
- Stats at Pro Football Reference

Arland Baron Thompson (born September 19, 1957) is an American former professional football player who was an offensive guard in the National Football League (NFL) for the Denver Broncos, Green Bay Packers, Baltimore Colts and Kansas City Chiefs. Thompson played College football for the Baylor Bears before being selected in the fourth round of the 1980 NFL draft. Thompson played professionally for four seasons in the NFL and retired in 1987.
