= Tom Pettigrew =

Scottish footballer (born 1936)

Personal information
- Full name: Thomas Pettigrew
- Date of birth: 1936 (age 89–90)
- Place of birth: Shettleston, Scotland
- Position: Left back

Senior career*
Years	Team	Apps	(Gls)
1956–1958	Queen's Park	0	(0)
1958–1962	Stirling Albion	110	(0)
- Chelmsford City
- Salisbury Callies

International career
1957	Scotland Amateurs	1	(0)
- * Club domestic league appearances and goals

Thomas Pettigrew (born 1936) was a Scottish football left back who made 110 appearances in the Scottish League for Stirling Albion. He was capped by Scotland at amateur level.

== Honours ==
Stirling Albion

- Scottish League Second Division: 1961–62
