= Myron Lapka =

American football player (1956–2025)

No. 71, 67
- Position: Defensive tackle

Personal information
- Born: May 10, 1956; Van Nuys, California, U.S.
- Died: October 13, 2025 (aged 69)
- Listed height: 6 ft 4 in (1.93 m)
- Listed weight: 258 lb (117 kg)

Career information
- High school: Chatsworth (Chatsworth, California)
- College: USC
- NFL draft: 1980: 3rd round, 64th overall pick

Career history
- New York Giants (1980); Baltimore Colts (1982)*; Los Angeles Rams (1982–1983); Green Bay Packers (1984)*
- * Offseason or practice squad member only

Awards and highlights
- Second-team All-Pac-10 (1979)

Career NFL statistics
- Sacks: 1.5
- Stats at Pro Football Reference

Myron Lynn Lapka (May 10, 1956 – October 13, 2025) was an American professional football player who was a defensive tackle in the National Football League (NFL). He was selected by the New York Giants in the third round of the 1980 NFL draft. Lapka played college football for the USC Trojans.

After his NFL career, Lapka worked as a Hollywood stuntman, and appeared in films such as Action Jackson (1988), Suburban Commando (1991), Universal Soldier (1992), and U.S. Marshals (1998).

Lapka died from cancer on October 13, 2025, at the age of 69.
