= 1979 Texas Tech Red Raiders football team =

American college football season

1979 Texas Tech Red Raiders football
- Conference: Southwest Conference
- Record: 3–6–2 (2–5–1 SWC)
- Head coach: Rex Dockery (2nd season)
- Offensive scheme: Option
- Defensive coordinator: Sam Robertson (2nd season)
- Base defense: 4–4
- Home stadium: Jones Stadium

1979 Southwest Conference football standings
	Conf.					Overall
Team	W		L		T	W		L		T
No. 5 Houston +	7	–	1	–	0	11	–	1	–	0
No. 8 Arkansas +	7	–	1	–	0	10	–	2	–	0
No. 12 Texas	6	–	2	–	0	9	–	3	–	0
No. 14 Baylor	5	–	3	–	0	8	–	4	–	0
Texas A&M	4	–	4	–	0	6	–	5	–	0
SMU	3	–	5	–	0	5	–	6	–	0
Texas Tech	2	–	5	–	1	3	–	6	–	2
TCU	1	–	6	–	1	2	–	8	–	1
Rice	0	–	8	–	0	1	–	10	–	0
+ – Conference co-champions; Rankings from AP Poll

The 1979 Texas Tech Red Raiders football team represented Texas Tech University as a member of the Southwest Conference (SWC) during the 1979 NCAA Division I-A football season. In their second season under head coach Rex Dockery, the Red Raiders compiled a 3–6–2 record (2–5–1 against SWC opponents), were outscored by a combined total of 182 to 141, and finished in seventh place in the conference. The team played its home games at Clifford B. and Audrey Jones Stadium in Lubbock, Texas.

== Schedule ==
Date	Opponent	Site	Result	Attendance	Source
September 8	No. 1 USC*	Jones Stadium; Lubbock, TX	L 7–21	52,991	
September 15	New Mexico*	Jones Stadium; Lubbock, TX	W 17–7	42,109	
September 22	at Arizona*	Arizona Stadium; Tucson, AZ	T 14–14	40,476	
September 29	at Baylor	Baylor Stadium; Waco, TX (rivalry)	L 17–27	35,800	
October 6	Texas A&M	Jones Stadium; Lubbock, TX (rivalry)	W 21–20	52,468	
October 13	Arkansas	Jones Stadium; Lubbock, TX (rivalry)	L 6–20	47,109	
October 20	Rice	Jones Stadium; Lubbock, TX	W 30–7	41,732	
November 3	at No. 8 Texas	Texas Memorial Stadium; Austin, TX (rivalry)	L 6–14	77,809	
November 10	TCU^{†}	Jones Stadium; Lubbock, TX (rivalry)	T 3–3	40,091	
November 17	at SMU	Cotton Bowl; Dallas, TX	L 10–35	42,226	
November 23	at No. 9 Houston	Houston Astrodome; Houston, TX (rivalry)	L 10–14	25,637	
*Non-conference game; ^{†}Homecoming; Rankings from AP Poll released prior to the game
