= Chris Linnin =

American football player (born 1957)

No. 74
- Position: Defensive tackle

Personal information
- Born: May 4, 1957 (age 69); Pasadena, California, U.S.
- Listed height: 6 ft 4 in (1.93 m)
- Listed weight: 255 lb (116 kg)

Career information
- High school: Arcadia
- College: Washington
- NFL draft: 1980: 7th round, 181st overall pick

Career history
- New York Giants (1980); Oakland Invaders (1984)
- Stats at Pro Football Reference

Christopher Bennett Linnin (born May 4, 1957) is an American former professional football player who was a defensive tackle for the New York Giants in the National Football League (NFL). He played college football for the Washington Huskies.
