= Bud Hebert =

American football player (born 1956)

No. 26
- Position: Safety

Personal information
- Born: October 12, 1956 (age 70); Beaumont, Texas, U.S.
- Listed height: 6 ft 0 in (1.83 m)
- Listed weight: 190 lb (86 kg)

Career information
- High school: South Park (Beaumont)
- College: Oklahoma
- NFL draft: 1980: 7th round, 179th overall pick

Career history
- New York Giants (1980)

Career NFL statistics
- Interceptions: 1
- Fumble recoveries: 1
- Stats at Pro Football Reference

Daryl Ray "Bud" Hebert (born October 12, 1956) is an American former professional football player who was a defensive back for the New York Giants of the National Football League (NFL). He played college football and baseball for the Oklahoma Sooners.
