= Wes Roberts =

American football player (born 1957)

No. 92, 79
- Position: Defensive end

Personal information
- Born: August 1, 1957 (age 69); Dodge City, Kansas, U.S.
- Listed height: 6 ft 6 in (1.98 m)
- Listed weight: 253 lb (115 kg)

Career information
- High school: Palo Duro (Amarillo, Texas)
- College: TCU
- NFL draft: 1980: 7th round, 170th overall pick

Career history
- Baltimore Colts (1980)*; New York Jets (1980); Tampa Bay Buccaneers (1981)*; Houston Oilers (1982); Michigan Panthers (1983)
- * Offseason or practice squad member only
- Stats at Pro Football Reference

Wesley Lee Roberts (born August 1, 1957) is an American former professional football player who was a defensive end for the New York Jets of the National Football League (NFL) in 1980. He played college football for the TCU Horned Frogs.
