= 1979 Texas Longhorns football team =

American college football season

1979 Texas Longhorns football

Sun Bowl, L 7–14 vs. Washington
- Conference: Southwest Conference

Ranking
- Coaches: No. 13
- AP: No. 12
- Record: 9–3 (6–2 SWC)
- Head coach: Fred Akers (3rd season)
- Offensive coordinator: Leon Manley (3rd season)
- Defensive coordinator: Leon Fuller (3rd season)
- Home stadium: Texas Memorial Stadium

1979 Southwest Conference football standings
	Conf.					Overall
Team	W		L		T	W		L		T
No. 5 Houston +	7	–	1	–	0	11	–	1	–	0
No. 8 Arkansas +	7	–	1	–	0	10	–	2	–	0
No. 12 Texas	6	–	2	–	0	9	–	3	–	0
No. 14 Baylor	5	–	3	–	0	8	–	4	–	0
Texas A&M	4	–	4	–	0	6	–	5	–	0
SMU	3	–	5	–	0	5	–	6	–	0
Texas Tech	2	–	5	–	1	3	–	6	–	2
TCU	1	–	6	–	1	2	–	8	–	1
Rice	0	–	8	–	0	1	–	10	–	0
+ – Conference co-champions; Rankings from AP Poll

The 1979 Texas Longhorns football team represented the University of Texas at Austin in the 1979 NCAA Division I-A football season. The Longhorns finished the regular season with a 9–2 record and lost to Washington in the Sun Bowl.

== Schedule ==
Date	Time	Opponent	Rank	Site	TV	Result	Attendance	Source
September 22	7:00 p.m.	Iowa State*	No. 4	Texas Memorial Stadium; Austin, TX		W 17–9	73,652	
September 29	1:30 p.m.	at No. 5 Missouri*	No. 4	Faurot Field; Columbia, MO		W 21–0	75,136	
October 6	7:00 p.m.	Rice	No. 4	Texas Memorial Stadium; Austin, TX (rivalry)		W 26–9	65,227	
October 13	3:00 p.m.	vs. No. 3 Oklahoma*	No. 4	Cotton Bowl; Dallas, TX (Red River Shootout)	ABC	W 16–7	72,032	
October 20	3:00 p.m.	at No. 10 Arkansas	No. 2	War Memorial Stadium; Little Rock, AR (rivalry)	ABC	L 14–17	55,838	
October 27	1:30 p.m.	at SMU	No. 9	Texas Stadium; Irving, TX		W 30–6	53,327	
November 3	2:00 p.m.	Texas Tech	No. 8	Texas Memorial Stadium; Austin, TX (rivalry)		W 14–6	77,809	
November 10	7:30 p.m.	at No. 5 Houston	No. 8	Houston Astrodome; Houston, TX		W 21–13	53,650	
November 17	2:00 p.m.	TCU	No. 6	Texas Memorial Stadium; Austin, TX (rivalry)		W 35–10	61,597	
November 24	2:00 p.m.	No. 17 Baylor	No. 6	Texas Memorial Stadium; Austin, TX (rivalry)		W 13–0	63,288	
December 1	1:30 p.m.	at Texas A&M	No. 6	Kyle Field; College Station, TX (rivalry)		L 7–13	69,017	
December 22	12:30 p.m.	vs. No. 13 Washington*	No. 11	Sun Bowl; El Paso, TX (Sun Bowl)	CBS	L 7–14	33,412	
*Non-conference game; Rankings from AP Poll released prior to the game; All times are in Central time

== Roster ==
1979 Texas Longhorns football team roster
Players
Coaches
Offense

Pos.	#	Name	Class
C	54	Mike Baab	So
WR	26	Lam Jones	Sr
QB	1	Donnie Little	So
TE	87	Lawrence Sampleton	So
RB		Rodney Tate	So
G	79	Terry Tausch	So

Defense

Pos.	#	Name	Class
DT	53	Bill Acker	Sr
DT	99	Steve McMichael	Sr
LB	51	Bruce Scholtz	So
DE	77	Kenneth Sims	So

Special teams

Pos.	#	Name	Class

Head coach

- Fred Akers

Coordinators/assistant coaches

Legend

- (C) Team captain
- (S) Suspended
- (I) Ineligible
- Injured
- Redshirt

== 1979 team players in the NFL ==
The following players were drafted into professional football following the season.

Player	Position	Round	Pick	Franchise
Lam Jones	Wide receiver	1	2	New York Jets
Johnnie Johnson	Cornerback	1	17	Los Angeles Rams
Derrick Hatchett	Safety	1	24	Baltimore Colts
Steve McMichael	Defensive tackle	3	73	New England Patriots
Ricky Churchman	Strong safety	4	84	San Francisco 49ers
Bill Acker	Defensive tackle	6	142	St. Louis Cardinals
Charles Vaclavik	Defensive back	12	306	Pittsburgh Steelers
