= Nate Rivers =

American football player (born 1955)

No. 34
- Position: Running back

Personal information
- Born: August 31, 1955 (age 71); Wadmalaw Island, South Carolina, U.S.
- Listed height: 6 ft 3 in (1.91 m)
- Listed weight: 215 lb (98 kg)

Career information
- High school: Johns Island (SC) St. John's
- College: South Carolina State
- NFL draft: 1980: 5th round, 135th overall pick

Career history
- Philadelphia Eagles (1980)*; New York Giants (1980); Baltimore Colts (1981)*
- * Offseason or practice squad member only
- Stats at Pro Football Reference

Nathan Rivers (born August 31, 1955) is an American former professional football player who was a running back for the New York Giants of the National Football League (NFL) in 1980. He played college football for the South Carolina State Bulldogs.
