= 1979 Houston Cougars football team =

American college football season

1979 Houston Cougars football
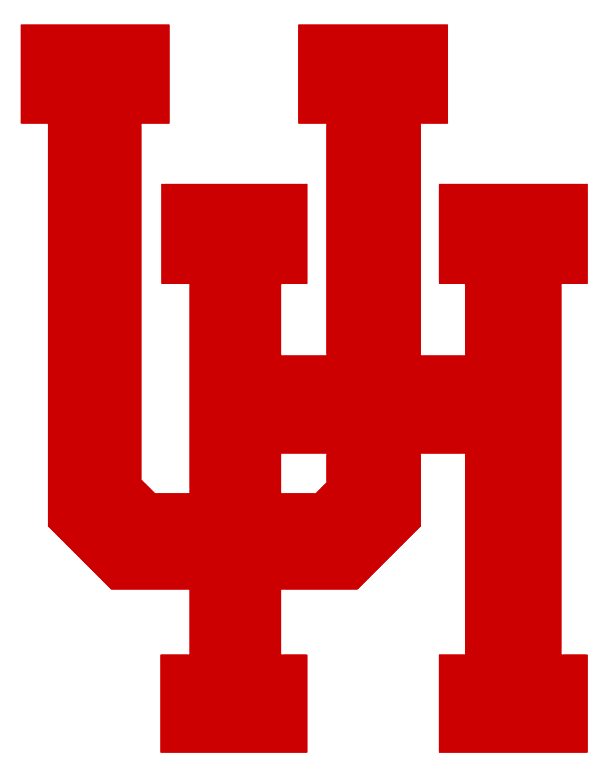

SWC co-champion Cotton Bowl Classic champion

Cotton Bowl Classic, W 17–14 vs. Nebraska
- Conference: Southwest Conference

Ranking
- Coaches: No. 5
- AP: No. 5
- Record: 11–1 (7–1 SWC)
- Head coach: Bill Yeoman (18th season)
- Offensive scheme: Houston Veer
- Defensive coordinator: Don Todd (8th season)
- Captains: David Hodge; Delrick Brown; Jim Wells
- Home stadium: Houston Astrodome

1979 Southwest Conference football standings
	Conf.					Overall
Team	W		L		T	W		L		T
No. 5 Houston +	7	–	1	–	0	11	–	1	–	0
No. 8 Arkansas +	7	–	1	–	0	10	–	2	–	0
No. 12 Texas	6	–	2	–	0	9	–	3	–	0
No. 14 Baylor	5	–	3	–	0	8	–	4	–	0
Texas A&M	4	–	4	–	0	6	–	5	–	0
SMU	3	–	5	–	0	5	–	6	–	0
Texas Tech	2	–	5	–	1	3	–	6	–	2
TCU	1	–	6	–	1	2	–	8	–	1
Rice	0	–	8	–	0	1	–	10	–	0
+ – Conference co-champions; Rankings from AP Poll

The 1979 Houston Cougars football team, also known as the Houston Cougars, Houston, or UH, represented the University of Houston in the 1979 NCAA Division I-A football season. The Cougars were led by 18th-year head coach Bill Yeoman and played their home games at the Astrodome in Houston, Texas. They competed as members of the Southwest Conference, finishing as co-champions with Arkansas. This was Houston's second consecutive conference championship, and their third overall in their first four years as members of the conference.

The Cougars finished the season with a record of 11–1. Their only loss was at home to the eighth-ranked Texas Longhorns, 21–13. Houston was invited to the 1980 Cotton Bowl Classic, played on New Year's Day, where they defeated seventh-ranked Nebraska. Houston finished ranked fifth in both major final polls.

== Schedule ==
Date	Opponent	Rank	Site	TV	Result	Attendance	Source
September 8	at UCLA*	No. 16	Los Angeles Memorial Coliseum; Los Angeles, CA		W 24–16	40,008	
September 15	Florida*	No. 13	Houston Astrodome; Houston, TX		W 14–10	33,851–34,432	
September 29	West Texas State*	No. 8	Houston Astrodome; Houston, TX		W 49–10	27,080	
October 6	Baylor	No. 6	Houston Astrodome; Houston, TX (rivalry)		W 13–10	37,142	
October 13	at Texas A&M	No. 7	Kyle Field; College Station, TX		W 17–14	59,545	
October 20	SMU^{†}	No. 5	Houston Astrodome; Houston, TX (rivalry)		W 37–10	43,409	
October 27	at No. 4 Arkansas	No. 6	Razorback Stadium; Fayetteville, AR	ABC	W 13–10	43,319	
November 3	at TCU	No. 4	Amon G. Carter Stadium; Fort Worth, TX		W 21–10	25,412	
November 10	No. 8 Texas	No. 5	Houston Astrodome; Houston, TX		L 13–21	53,650	
November 23	Texas Tech	No. 9	Houston Astrodome; Houston, TX (rivalry)	ABC	W 14–10	25,637	
December 1	at Rice	No. 10	Rice Stadium; Houston, TX (rivalry)		W 63–0	27,800	
January 1	vs. No. 7 Nebraska*	No. 8	Cotton Bowl; Dallas, TX (Cotton Bowl Classic)	CBS	W 17–14	72,032	
*Non-conference game; ^{†}Homecoming; Rankings from AP Poll released prior to the game

== Game summaries ==
=== at Arkansas ===
Game Seven – No. 6 Houston Cougars (6–0) at No. 4 Arkansas Razorbacks (6–0) – Game summary

Quarter	1	2	3	4	Total
No. 6 Cougars	7	0	0	6	13
No. 4 Razorbacks	3	7	0	0	10

at Razorback Stadium • Fayetteville, Arkansas

- Date: October 27, 1979
- Game time: 11:30 a.m. CDT
- Game attendance: 43,319
- TV announcers (ABC): Keith Jackson (play-by-play), Ara Parseghian (color commentator) and Bill Flemming (sideline reporter)

Game information

First Quarter

- (0:00) ARK –
- (0:00) HOU –

Second Quarter

- (0:00) ARK –

Third Quarter

No scoring plays

Fourth Quarter

- (0:00) HOU –
- (0:00) HOU –

Statistics	HOU	ARK
First downs		
Total yards		
Rushing yards		
Passing yards		
Passing: Comp–Att–Int		
Time of possession		

Team	Category	Player	Statistics
Houston	Passing		
Houston	Rushing		
Houston	Receiving		
Arkansas	Passing		
Arkansas	Rushing		
Arkansas	Receiving		

=== vs Texas ===
Game Nine – No. 8 Texas Longhorns (6–1) at No. 5 Houston Cougars (8–0) – Game summary

Quarter	1	2	3	4	Total
No. 8 Longhorns	7	7	0	7	21
No. 5 Cougars	3	7	0	3	13

at Houston Astrodome • Houston, Texas

- Date: November 10, 1979
- Game time: 7:30 p.m. CST
- Game attendance: 53,650
- Referee: Clint Fuller (SWC)

Game information

First Quarter

- (8:09) HOU –
- (1:45) TEX –

Second Quarter

- (11:14) HOU –
- (1:24) TEX –

Third Quarter

No scoring plays

Fourth Quarter

- (13:24) HOU –
- (1:25) TEX –

Statistics	TEX	HOU
First downs		
Total yards		
Rushing yards		
Passing yards		
Passing: Comp–Att–Int		
Time of possession		

Team	Category	Player	Statistics
Texas	Passing		
Texas	Rushing		
Texas	Receiving		
Houston	Passing		
Houston	Rushing		
Houston	Receiving		

=== vs Texas Tech ===
Game Ten – Texas Tech Red Raiders (3–5–2) at No. 9 Houston Cougars (8–1) – Game summary

Quarter	1	2	3	4	Total
Red Raiders	3	0	7	0	10
No. 9 Cougars	0	0	7	7	14

at Houston Astrodome • Houston, Texas

- Date: November 23, 1979
- Game time: 2:00 p.m. CST
- Game attendance: 25,637
- TV announcers (ABC): Verne Lundquist (play-by-play) and Steve Davis (color commentator)

Game information

First Quarter

- (0:00) TTU –

Second Quarter

No scoring plays

Third Quarter

- (0:00) TTU –
- (0:00) HOU –

Fourth Quarter

- (0:00) HOU –

Statistics	TTU	HOU
First downs		
Total yards		
Rushing yards		
Passing yards		
Passing: Comp–Att–Int		
Time of possession		

Team	Category	Player	Statistics
Texas Tech	Passing		
Texas Tech	Rushing		
Texas Tech	Receiving		
Houston	Passing		
Houston	Rushing		
Houston	Receiving		

=== vs Nebraska—Cotton Bowl Classic ===
1980 Cotton Bowl Classic: No. 7 Nebraska Cornhuskers (10–1) vs No. 8 Houston Cougars (10–1) – Game summary

Quarter	1	2	3	4	Total
No. 7 Cornhuskers	7	0	0	7	14
No. 8 Cougars	0	7	0	10	17

at Cotton Bowl • Dallas, Texas

- Date: January 1, 1980
- Game time: 1:00 p.m. CST
- Game attendance: 72,032
- Referee: Robert Aillet (SEC)
- TV announcers (CBS): Lindsey Nelson (play-by-play – 1st quarter), Frank Glieber (sideline reporter – 1st quarter; play-by-play – 2nd thru 4th quarters) and Paul Hornung (color commentator)

Game information

First quarter

- (5:13) NEB – Jarvis Redwine 9-yard run, (Dean Sukup kick) (Drive: 14 plays, 85 yards, 0:00; Nebraska 7–0)

Second quarter

- (12:17) HOU – Terry Elston 8-yard run, (Kenny Hatfield kick) (Drive: 6 plays, 71 yards, 0:00; Tied 7–7)

Third quarter

No scoring plays

Fourth quarter

- (8:25) HOU – Kenny Hatfield 41-yard field goal (Drive: 13 plays, 59 yards, 0:00; Houston 10–7)
- (3:56) NEB – Jeff Finn 6-yard pass from Jeff Quinn, (Dean Sukup kick) (Drive: 6 plays, 31 yards, 0:00; Nebraska 14–10)
- (0:12) HOU – Eric Herring 6-yard pass from Terry Elston, (Kenny Hatfield kick) (Drive: 13 plays, 66 yards, 0:00; Houston 17–14)

Statistics	NEB	HOU
First downs		
Total yards		
Rushing yards		
Passing yards		
Passing: Comp–Att–Int		
Time of possession		

Team	Category	Player	Statistics
Nebraska	Passing		
Nebraska	Rushing		
Nebraska	Receiving		
Houston	Passing		
Houston	Rushing		
Houston	Receiving		

== Roster ==
1979 Houston Cougars football team roster
Players
Coaches
Offense

Pos.	#	Name	Class

Defense

Pos.	#	Name	Class
DE	70	Leonard Mitchell	Jr
DT	79	Hosea Taylor	Jr

Special teams

Pos.	#	Name	Class

Head coach

- Bill Yeoman

Coordinators/assistant coaches

Legend

- (C) Team captain
- (S) Suspended
- (I) Ineligible
- Injured
- Redshirt
