= 1979 Rice Owls football team =

American college football season

1979 Rice Owls football
- Conference: Southwest Conference
- Record: 1–10 (0–8 SWC)
- Head coach: Ray Alborn (2nd season)
- Home stadium: Rice Stadium

1979 Southwest Conference football standings
	Conf.					Overall
Team	W		L		T	W		L		T
No. 5 Houston +	7	–	1	–	0	11	–	1	–	0
No. 8 Arkansas +	7	–	1	–	0	10	–	2	–	0
No. 12 Texas	6	–	2	–	0	9	–	3	–	0
No. 14 Baylor	5	–	3	–	0	8	–	4	–	0
Texas A&M	4	–	4	–	0	6	–	5	–	0
SMU	3	–	5	–	0	5	–	6	–	0
Texas Tech	2	–	5	–	1	3	–	6	–	2
TCU	1	–	6	–	1	2	–	8	–	1
Rice	0	–	8	–	0	1	–	10	–	0
+ – Conference co-champions; Rankings from AP Poll

The 1979 Rice Owls football team was an American football team that represented Rice University in the Southwest Conference during the 1979 NCAA Division I-A football season. In their second year under head coach Ray Alborn, the team compiled a 1–10 record.

== Schedule ==
Date	Opponent	Site	Result	Attendance	Source
September 8	at SMU	Texas Stadium; Irving, TX (rivalry)	L 17–35	60,217	
September 15	Tulane*	Rice Stadium; Houston, TX	W 21–17	15,000	
September 22	at LSU*	Tiger Stadium; Baton Rouge, LA	L 3–47	74,934	
September 29	No. 3 Oklahoma*	Rice Stadium; Houston, TX	L 21–63	30,442	
October 6	at No. 4 Texas	Texas Memorial Stadium; Austin, TX (rivalry)	L 9–26	65,227	
October 13	TCU	Rice Stadium; Houston, TX	L 7–17	12,000	
October 20	at Texas Tech	Jones Stadium; Lubbock, TX	L 7–30	41,732	
October 27	Texas A&M	Rice Stadium; Houston, TX	L 15–41	43,000	
November 3	No. 9 Arkansas	Rice Stadium; Houston, TX	L 7–34	17,000	
November 17	at No. 20 Baylor	Baylor Stadium; Waco, TX	L 14–45	28,500	
December 1	No. 10 Houston	Rice Stadium; Houston, TX (rivalry)	L 0–63	27,800	
*Non-conference game; Rankings from AP Poll released prior to the game
