= Tony Blount =

American football player (born 1958)

No. 23, 40
- Position: Defensive back

Personal information
- Born: November 5, 1958 (age 68); Atlanta, Georgia, U.S.
- Listed height: 6 ft 1 in (1.85 m)
- Listed weight: 195 lb (88 kg)

Career information
- High school: Douglass (Atlanta)
- College: Virginia
- NFL draft: 1980: 5th round, 118th overall pick

Career history
- New York Giants (1980); Atlanta Falcons (1982)*; Denver Gold (1983)
- * Offseason or practice squad member only

Awards and highlights
- First-team All-ACC (1979)
- Stats at Pro Football Reference

Anthony Urban Blount (born November 5, 1958) is an American former professional football player who was a defensive back in the National Football League (NFL) and United States Football League (USFL). He played college football for the Virginia Cavaliers. Blount played for the NFL's New York Giants in 1980 and with the Denver Gold in the USFL in 1983.
