= Dale Markham =

American football player (born 1957)

No. 62, 72, 79, 80
- Positions: Offensive tackle, defensive end

Personal information
- Born: July 24, 1957; Whitewater, Wisconsin, U.S.
- Listed height: 6 ft 8 in (2.03 m)
- Listed weight: 280 lb (127 kg)

Career information
- High school: Whitewater (Whitewater, Wisconsin)
- College: North Dakota
- NFL draft: 1980: 11th round, 287th overall pick

Career history
- Kansas City Chiefs (1980)*; New York Giants (1980); Kansas City Chiefs (1981)*; St. Louis Cardinals (1981); Winnipeg Blue Bombers (1982)*; Oakland Invaders (1983–1985); Green Bay Packers (1985)*
- * Offseason or practice squad member only

Career NFL statistics
- Games played: 3
- Stats at Pro Football Reference

Dale Markham (born July 24, 1957) is a former player in the National Football League (NFL) for the New York Giants and St. Louis Cardinals in 1980 and 1981 as a tackle and defensive end. He played at the collegiate level at the University of North Dakota.

== Early life ==
Markham was born Dale Jon Markham on July 24, 1957, in Whitewater, Wisconsin. He starred with his family in the educational shorts Farm Family in Autumn, Farm Family in Spring, Farm Family in Summer, and Farm Family in Winter. These shorts showed what life was like on the farm during different seasons.

== College career ==
He played football at the University of North Dakota. During his college career, he played on the defensive line and wore jersey number 80. He graduated with a degree in industrial technology in 1980.

== Professional career ==
=== Kansas City Chiefs ===
He was drafted 287th overall by the Kansas City Chiefs in the 11th round of the 1980 NFL draft. Markham was then released by the Chiefs on August 25, 1980.

=== New York Giants ===
Markham signed with the New York Giants on December 3, 1980. He would see his first NFL action on Sunday, December 21, 1980, in a home game played at Giants Stadium in East Rutherford, New Jersey, against the Oakland Raiders. He was later released by the Giants on June 23, 1981.

=== Second stint with Kansas City Chiefs ===
Markham was claimed on procedural waivers by the Chiefs on July 17, 1981, and then was released on August 3, 1981. During this period, he would briefly rejoin his college teammate and friend, Todd Thomas as a member of the Chiefs' roster. They remain as the only two players from North Dakota ever drafted by the Kansas City Chiefs, Markham was the first in 1980 and Thomas followed him a year later in 1981.

=== St. Louis Cardinals ===
On August 8, 1981, the Cardinals signed Markham off waivers from the Kansas City Chiefs and then released him on August 25, 1981. He was re-signed on December 10, 1981, and played in their final two games of the 1981 season. These games included a home game against his former team, the New York Giants and on December 20, 1981, his final regular season game as an NFL player, a road game versus the Philadelphia Eagles. In 1982, he reported to the Cardinals' Training Camp, at Eastern Illinois University in Charleston, but was released as part of the final cuts on September 6, 1982.

=== Winnipeg Blue Bombers ===
On September 14, 1982, Markham was placed on a 14-day trial with the Winnipeg Blue Bombers. This would temporarily reunite Markham with college teammates, running back Milson Jones and defensive tackle Stan Mikawos, both of whom were North Dakota alumni and on the 1982 Blue Bombers roster.

=== Oakland Invaders ===
Markham signed with the Oakland Invaders of the United States Football League on January 26, 1983, and went on to play in 54 regular season and four playoff games between 1983 and 1985. He was just one of nine players from the Invaders' inaugural March 6, 1983, roster that would still be around during the 1985 season. During his tenure with the Invaders, he played tackle and wore jersey number 72. On July 14, 1985, Markham played in the 1985 championship game held at Giants Stadium, the last USFL game ever played.

=== Green Bay Packers ===
Markham attended the Packers’ training camp in 1985. On August 17, 1985, he returned to a familiar venue, Giants Stadium to play in a Saturday night exhibition game against his former team, the New York Giants. Notable was that only 34-days earlier he played in the USFL championship game at this same location. The Green Bay Packers released Markham on August 28, 1985.

== See also ==
- List of New York Giants players
