= Andrew Melontree =

American football player (born 1957)

No. 59
- Position: Linebacker

Personal information
- Born: December 1, 1957 (age 68); Tyler, Texas, U.S.
- Listed height: 6 ft 4 in (1.93 m)
- Listed weight: 228 lb (103 kg)

Career information
- High school: John Tyler
- College: Baylor
- NFL draft: 1980: 6th round, 159th overall pick

Career history
- Cincinnati Bengals (1980); Tampa Bay Buccaneers (1982)*; Chicago Blitz (1983); Arizona Wranglers (1984); Los Angeles Express (1985)
- * Offseason or practice squad member only

Awards and highlights
- Peach Bowl Defensive MVP (1979)

Career NFL statistics
- Fumble recoveries: 1
- Stats at Pro Football Reference

Andrew Richard Melontree Jr. (born December 1, 1957) is an American former professional football player who was a linebacker for the Cincinnati Bengals of the National Football League (NFL). He played college football for the Baylor Bears.
