= Kelly Saalfeld =

American football player (born 1956)

Kelly Dean Saalfeld (born February 15, 1956) is a former center in the National Football League (NFL). Saalfeld was drafted by the Green Bay Packers in the ninth round of the 1980 NFL draft and would play that season with the New York Giants.

== Early life ==
Saalfeld grew up on a farm near Columbus, Nebraska, and suffered many injuries as a child, including two concussions and two broken arms. He attended Lakeview High School in Columbus, where he played football. Saalfeld earned a full scholarship to Kearney State College, but turned it down to attend the University of Nebraska–Lincoln.

== College career ==
Saalfeld walked on to the Nebraska freshman team in 1975. He was then redshirted his second season, after which he was converted from an offensive tackle to center. In 1977, Saalfeld served as a backup to All-American center Tom Davis and earned his first letter. He went on to serve as the starting center in 1978 and 1979, earning third-team All-American honors from the Football News and a Senior Bowl invite as a senior.

Kelly Saalfeld
No. 59
- Position: Center

Personal information
- Born: February 15, 1956 (age 70); Columbus, Nebraska, U.S.
- Listed height: 6 ft 3 in (1.91 m)
- Listed weight: 246 lb (112 kg)

Career information
- High school: Columbus (NE) Lakeview
- College: Nebraska
- NFL draft: 1980: 9th round, 226th overall pick

Career history
- Green Bay Packers (1980)*; New York Giants (1980)
- * Offseason or practice squad member only

Awards and highlights
- Second-team All-Big Eight (1979)

Career NFL statistics
- Games played: 7
- Stats at Pro Football Reference

Saalfeld was inducted into the Nebraska Football Hall of Fame in 2009.

== Professional career ==
Saalfeld was drafted by the Green Bay Packers in the ninth round of the 1980 NFL draft. He was cut in August. Saalfeld was signed by the New York Giants that November and played in seven games in the 1980 season.

== Post-playing career ==
Saalfeld later refereed at the professional level in NFL Europe and the Arena Football League. He also refereed in college football, including the 2009 Senior Bowl – 29 years after playing in the same all-star game.
