= Larry Heater =

American football player (born 1958)

No. 27
- Position: Running back

Personal information
- Born: January 9, 1958 (age 68); Cincinnati, Ohio, U.S.
- Listed height: 5 ft 11 in (1.80 m)
- Listed weight: 205 lb (93 kg)

Career information
- High school: North Las Vegas (NV) Rancho
- College: Arizona
- NFL draft: 1980: 6th round, 164 (by the Kansas City Chiefs)th overall pick

Career history
- Kansas City Chiefs (1980)*; New York Giants (1980, 1982–1983)
- * Offseason or practice squad member only

Awards and highlights
- Second-team All-Pac-10 (1978)

Career NFL statistics
- Rushing yards: 373
- Rushing average: 3.3
- Touchdowns: 3
- Stats at Pro Football Reference

Larry Heater (born January 9, 1958) is an American former professional football player who was a running back for the New York Giants of the National Football League (NFL) in the 1980s. Heater played college football for the Arizona Wildcats and was selected 164th overall by the Kansas City Chiefs in the sixth round of the 1980 NFL draft.
