= Danny Pittman =

American football player (born 1958)

No. 82, 85
- Position: Wide receiver

Personal information
- Born: April 3, 1958 (age 68); Memphis, Tennessee, U.S.
- Listed height: 6 ft 2 in (1.88 m)
- Listed weight: 205 lb (93 kg)

Career information
- High school: John Muir (Pasadena, California)
- College: Pasadena CC (1976–1977); Wyoming (1978–1979)
- NFL draft: 1980: 4th round, 90th overall pick

Career history
- New York Giants (1980–1983); St. Louis Cardinals (1983–1984)

Career NFL statistics
- Receptions: 46
- Receiving yards: 657
- Touchdowns: 1
- Stats at Pro Football Reference

Danny Ray Pittman (born April 3, 1958) is an American former professional football player who was a wide receiver for five seasons in the National Football League (NFL) with the New York Giants and St. Louis Cardinals. He was selected by the Giants in the fourth round of the 1980 NFL draft. He played college football at Pasadena City College and the University of Wyoming.

== Early life ==
Danny Ray Pittman was born on April 3, 1958, in Memphis, Tennessee. He attended John Muir High School in Pasadena, California.

== College career ==
Pittman first played college football at Pasadena City College from 1976 to 1977. He was then a two-year letterman for the Wyoming Cowboys of the University of Wyoming from 1978 to 1979. He caught 15 passes for 367 yards and three touchdowns in 1976 while also returning 14 kicks for 271 yards. As a senior in 1979, he recorded 41 receptions for 733 yards and six touchdowns, and 16 kick returns for 333 yards.

== Professional career ==
Pittman was selected by the New York Giants in the fourth round, with the 90th overall pick, of the 1980 NFL draft. He played in 11 games, starting six, as a rookie in 1980, catching 25 passes for 308 yards and returning two kicks for 41 yards. He was placed on injured reserve the next year on September 8, 1981, but was later activated on November 6, 1981. Overall, he appeared in eight games during the 1981 season, totaling one catch for eight yards, ten kick returns for 194 yards, one punt return for 13 yards, two fumbles, and one fumble recovery. Pittman also played in two playoff games that year but did not record any statistics. He played in eight games in 1982, recording one reception for 21 yards, five kick returns for 117 yards, and six punt returns for 40 yards. He appeared in eight games for the Giants for the third straight season in 1983, catching seven passes for 154 yards and one touchdown while also returning six kicks for 107 yards. He was released by the Giants on October 29, 1983.

Pittman was claimed off waivers by the St. Louis Cardinals on November 1, 1983. He played in four games for the Cardinals in 1983, accumulating two receptions for 21 yards. He was placed on injured reserve the next year on August 27, 1984. He was released on October 10 but re-signed two days later. He then appeared in ten games for the Cardinals in 1984, totaling ten catches for 145 yards, 14 kick returns for 319 yards, four punt returns for 10 yards, one fumble, and one fumble recovery. Pittman became a free agent after the season.

== Personal life ==
Pittman's son, David Pittman, played college football at Pasadena City College and the University of Minnesota.
