= Mike Mosley (American football) =

American football player (born 1958)

No. 88
- Position: Wide receiver

Personal information
- Born: June 30, 1958 (age 68); Hillsboro, Texas, U.S.
- Listed height: 6 ft 2 in (1.88 m)
- Listed weight: 192 lb (87 kg)

Career information
- High school: Humble (Humble, Texas)
- College: Texas A&M
- NFL draft: 1981: 3rd round, 76th overall pick

Career history
- Buffalo Bills (1982–1984)

Career NFL statistics
- Receptions: 27
- Receiving yards: 314
- Receiving touchdowns: 3
- Stats at Pro Football Reference

Michael Gene Mosley (born June 30, 1958) is an American former professional football player who was a wide receiver in the National Football League (NFL).

== Early life ==
Mosley starred at Humble High School in Humble, Texas.

== College career ==
He played quarterback at Texas A&M, where he finished his career 3rd all-time for the Aggies in rushing yards by a quarterback. As a freshman, Mosley replaced an injured David Walker against TCU and led the Aggies to victory in Fort Worth rushing for 96 yards and a touchdown in a 52–23 thrashing of the Horned Frogs. Mosley would not relinquish the job, becoming the Aggies' starting quarterback for the next three seasons.

== Professional career ==
Mosley was selected 76th overall as a receiver by the Buffalo Bills in the third round of the 1981 NFL draft. During his first season, he was on injured reserve with a pulled hamstring. In his second season he was a special teams standout as the team's kick returner.

On October 30, 1983, Mosley came on during the second quarter as a substitute for injured wide receiver Jerry Butler, helping the Bills to victory against the New Orleans Saints with five catches for 59 yards and two touchdowns.

Unfortunately, a series of injuries cut short his promising NFL career and forced Mosley to retire after the 1984 season.
