= 1979 Arkansas Razorbacks football team =

American college football season

1979 Arkansas Razorbacks football

SWC co-champion

Sugar Bowl, L 9–24 vs. Alabama
- Conference: Southwest Conference

Ranking
- Coaches: No. 9
- AP: No. 8
- Record: 10–2 (6–2 SWC)
- Head coach: Lou Holtz (3rd season)
- Defensive coordinator: Monte Kiffin (3rd season)
- Captains: Jim Howard; Roland Sales
- Home stadium: Razorback Stadium; War Memorial Stadium

1979 Southwest Conference football standings
	Conf.					Overall
Team	W		L		T	W		L		T
No. 5 Houston +	7	–	1	–	0	11	–	1	–	0
No. 8 Arkansas +	7	–	1	–	0	10	–	2	–	0
No. 12 Texas	6	–	2	–	0	9	–	3	–	0
No. 14 Baylor	5	–	3	–	0	8	–	4	–	0
Texas A&M	4	–	4	–	0	6	–	5	–	0
SMU	3	–	5	–	0	5	–	6	–	0
Texas Tech	2	–	5	–	1	3	–	6	–	2
TCU	1	–	6	–	1	2	–	8	–	1
Rice	0	–	8	–	0	1	–	10	–	0
+ – Conference co-champions; Rankings from AP Poll

The 1979 Arkansas Razorbacks football team represented the University of Arkansas in the Southwest Conference (SWC) during the 1979 NCAA Division I-A football season. In their third year under head coach Lou Holtz, the Razorbacks compiled a 10–2 record (7–1 against SWC opponents), finished in a tie with Houston for the SWC championship, and outscored their opponents by a combined total of 284 to 132. The Razorbacks' only regular season loss was to Houston by a 13–10 score. The team advanced to the 1980 Sugar Bowl, losing to undefeated national champion Alabama by a 24–9 score. Arkansas was ranked No. 8 in the final AP poll and No. 9 in the final UPI Coaches Poll.

Offensive tackle Greg Kolenda was a consensus All-American for the Razorbacks in 1979. Placekicker Ish Ordonez led the nation in field goals with 18 and lead the Southwest Conference in scoring for the second year in a row with 80 points. He broke the NCAA record of 12 consecutive field goals making 16 and hit 18 of 22 field goals on the season, for an 82% average and was second-team All-American. All SWC Quarterback Kevin Scanlon was selected the Southwest Conference Player of the Year and honorable mention All American. Arkansas was tied for sixth in scoring defense, giving up 108 points in 11 games (9.8 points per game).

== Schedule ==
Date	Opponent	Rank	Site	TV	Result	Attendance	Source
September 15	Colorado State*	No. 17	War Memorial Stadium; Little Rock, AR		W 36–3	55,317	
September 22	Oklahoma State*	No. 15	War Memorial Stadium; Little Rock, AR		W 27–7	55,812	
September 29	Tulsa*	No. 13	Razorback Stadium; Fayetteville, AR		W 33–8	45,742	
October 6	at TCU	No. 13	Amon G. Carter Stadium; Fort Worth, TX		W 16–13	25,317	
October 13	at Texas Tech	No. 12	Jones Stadium; Lubbock, TX (rivalry)		W 20–6	47,109	
October 20	No. 2 Texas	No. 10	War Memorial Stadium; Little Rock, AR (rivalry)	ABC	W 17–14	55,838	
October 27	No. 6 Houston	No. 4	Razorback Stadium; Fayetteville, AR	ABC	L 10–13	43,319	
November 3	at Rice	No. 9	Rice Stadium; Houston, TX		W 34–7	17,000	
November 10	No. 17 Baylor	No. 9	Razorback Stadium; Fayetteville, AR		W 29–20	43,284	
November 17	at Texas A&M	No. 8	Kyle Field; College Station, TX (rivalry)		W 22–10	62,648	
November 24	SMU	No. 7	War Memorial Stadium; Little Rock, AR		W 31–7	54,718	
January 1	vs. No. 2 Alabama*	No. 6	Louisiana Superdome; New Orleans, LA (Sugar Bowl)	ABC	L 9–24	77,486	
*Non-conference game; Rankings from AP Poll released prior to the game

== Game summaries ==
=== Texas ===
Team	1	2	3	4	Total
Texas	7	0	0	7	14
• Arkansas	0	7	7	3	17

- Date: October 20
- Location: War Memorial Stadium
- Game attendance: 55,838
- TV announcers (ABC): Al Michaels and Ara Parseghian

Scoring summary
Q1		TEX	Jam Jones 37 yard run (Goodson kick)	TEX 7–0
Q2		ARK	Anderson 28 yard run (Ordonez kick)	Tie 7–7
Q3		ARK	Mason 7 yard pass from Scanlon (Ordonez kick)	ARK 14–7
Q4	8:25	ARK	Ordonez 31 yard field goal	ARK 17–7
Q4		TEX	Stapleton 35 yard pass from Little (Goodson kick)	ARK 17–14

Texas' John Goodson missed a 51-yard field goal into a 24-mile per hour wind with 1:29 left to play as Arkansas beat the Longhorns for the first time since 1971.

== Roster ==
- RB Gary Anderson, Fresh
- DB Kim Dameron, Fresh
- Jeff Goff (defense), Soph
- DE Jim Howard
- P Bruce Lahay
- TE Darryl Mason
- WR TE Gene Ratliff
- PK Ish Ordonez
- Ricky Richardson (defense), Soph
- QB Kevin Scanlon, Sr.
- G George Stewart
