= 1979 Stanford Cardinals football team =

American college football season

1979 Stanford Cardinals football
- Conference: Pacific-10 Conference
- Record: 5–5–1 (3–3–1 Pac-10)
- Head coach: Rod Dowhower (1st season)
- Home stadium: Stanford Stadium

1979 Pacific-10 Conference football standings
	Conf.					Overall
Team	W		L		T	W		L		T
No. 2 USC $	6	–	0	–	1	11	–	0	–	1
No. 11 Washington	5	–	2	–	0	9	–	3	–	0
Arizona	4	–	3	–	0	6	–	5	–	1
Oregon	4	–	3	–	0	6	–	5	–	0
California	5	–	4	–	0	6	–	6	–	0
Stanford	3	–	3	–	1	5	–	5	–	1
Arizona State *	3	–	4	–	0	6	–	6	–	0
UCLA	3	–	4	–	0	5	–	6	–	0
Washington State	2	–	6	–	0	3	–	8	–	0
Oregon State	1	–	7	–	0	1	–	10	–	0
$ – Conference champion; * – Arizona State later forfeited 5 wins (3 in conference) due to NCAA sanctions; Rankings from AP Poll

The 1979 Stanford Cardinals football team represented Stanford University in the Pacific-10 Conference during the 1979 NCAA Division I-A football season. Led by first-year head coach Rod Dowhower, the Cardinals had a 5–5–1 overall record (3–3–1 in Pac-10, sixth).

Senior starting quarterback Turk Schonert split time with freshman John Elway.

Dowhower was promoted to head coach in January; he was previously the receivers coach for two seasons under Bill Walsh, who left for the NFL's San Francisco 49ers. After the season in January 1980, Dowhower left to become the offensive coordinator with the NFL's Denver Broncos, and was succeeded by alumnus Paul Wiggin.

== Schedule ==
Date	Opponent	Rank	Site	Result	Attendance	Source
September 8	at Tulane*	No. 13	Louisiana Superdome; New Orleans, LA	L 10–33	41,251	
September 15	San Jose State*		Stanford Stadium; Stanford, CA (rivalry)	W 45–29	46,789	
September 22	Army*		Stanford Stadium; Stanford, CA	L 13–17	43,345	
September 29	Boston College*		Stanford Stadium; Stanford, CA	W 33–14	36,412	
October 6	UCLA		Stanford Stadium; Stanford, CA	W 27–24	70,205	
October 13	at No. 1 USC		Los Angeles Memorial Coliseum; Los Angeles, CA (rivalry)	T 21–21	76,067	
October 20	at Arizona		Arizona Stadium; Tucson, AZ	W 30–10	55,000	
October 27	at Oregon State		Parker Stadium; Corvallis, OR	L 31–33	16,000	
November 3	Arizona State		Stanford Stadium; Stanford, CA	W 28–21	40,184	
November 10	Oregon		Stanford Stadium; Stanford, CA	L 7–16	45,219	
November 17	California		Stanford Stadium; Stanford, CA (Big Game)	L 14–21	85,577	
*Non-conference game; Rankings from AP Poll released prior to the game

== Game summaries ==
=== San Jose State ===
Mike Dotterer became the first freshman in school history to score three touchdowns in one game during Stanford's 45–29 victory. The Spartans were led by first-year head coach Jack Elway, father of John, who became Stanford's head coach after the 1983 season.

=== At Arizona ===
Team	1	2	3	4	Total
• Stanford	7	0	7	16	30
Arizona	0	7	3	0	10

- Date: October 20
- Location: Tucson, Arizona

Scoring summary
1	STAN	Hooper 3 yard pass from Schonert (Naber kick)	STAN 7-0
2	ARIZ	Hersey 5 yard run (Zivic kick)	Tied 7-7
3	ARIZ	Zivic 27 yard field goal	ARIZ 10-7
3	STAN	Tyler 15 yard pass from Schonert (Naber kick)	STAN 14-10
4	STAN	Naber 30 yard field goal	STAN 17-10
4	STAN	Dotterer 7 yard pass from Schonert (Naber kick)	STAN 24-10
4	STAN	Margerum 13 yard pass from Elway (kick failed)	STAN 30-10

=== California ===
California Golden Bears (5–5) at Stanford Cardinals (5–4–1)

Quarter	1	2	3	4	Total
California	14	0	0	7	21
Stanford	0	7	7	0	14

at Stanford Stadium, Stanford, California

- Date: November 17
- Game attendance: 85,577
- Referee: John Barger

Game information

First quarter

- CAL – Jack Rose 23-yard pass from Rich Campbell (Mick Luckhurst kick). California 7–0. Drive: 5 plays, 81 yards.
- CAL – Greg Woodard 28-yard pass from Rich Campbell (Mick Luckhurst kick). California 14–0. Drive: 6 plays, 82 yards.

Second quarter

- STAN – Vincent White 17-yard pass from Turk Schonert (Ken Naber kick). California 14–7. Drive: 13 plays, 82 yards.

Third quarter

- STAN – Andre Tyler 16-yard pass from Turk Schonert (Ken Naber kick). Tie 14–14. Drive: 5 plays, 32 yards.

Fourth quarter

- CAL – Jack Rose 17-yard pass from Rich Campbell (Mick Luckhurst kick). California 21–14. Drive:

Top passers

- CAL – Rich Campbell – 23/33, 315 yards, 3 TD, int
- STAN – Turk Schonert – 22/32, 225 yards, 2 TD

Top rushers

- CAL – Paul Jones – 24 rushes, 92 yards
- STAN – Vincent White – 10 rushes, 26 yards

Top receivers

- CAL – Jack Rose – 8 receptions, 121 yards, 2 TD
- STAN – Ken Margerum – 6 receptions, 61 yards

== Roster ==
1979 Stanford Cardinal football team roster
Players
Coaches
Offense

Pos.	#	Name	Class
RB	24	Mike Dotterer	Fr
TE	83	Chris Dressel	Fr
QB	7	John Elway	Fr
OT	79	Andre Hines	Sr
OT	67	Brian Holloway	Jr
C	66	John Macauley	Jr
WR	28	Ken Margerum	Jr
G	68	Mike Neill	Jr
RB	31	Darrin Nelson	Jr
QB	14	Turk Schonert	Sr
WR	25	Andre Tyler	Jr
RB	22	Vincent White	Fr

Defense

Pos.	#	Name	Class
DT	89	Chuck Evans	Sr
DT	94	Dan Floyd	Sr
FS		Steve Foley	Jr
CB	11	Rick Gervais	Jr
CB	20	Rod Gilmore	So
LB	99	Tom Hall	Jr

Special teams

Pos.	#	Name	Class
K, P	10	Ken Naber	Jr

Head coach

- Rod Dowhower (1st year)

Coordinators/assistant coaches

- Al Lavan – Running backs
- Jim Fassel – Wide receivers
- Tom Lovat – Offensive line
- Russell Charles – Offensive line
- Bill Dutton – Defensive line
- John Godden – Inside linebackers
- Ray Handley – Linebackers
- George Seifert – Defensive back

Legend

- (C) Team captain
- (S) Suspended
- (I) Ineligible
- Injured
- Redshirt
