= List of California Golden Bears bowl games =

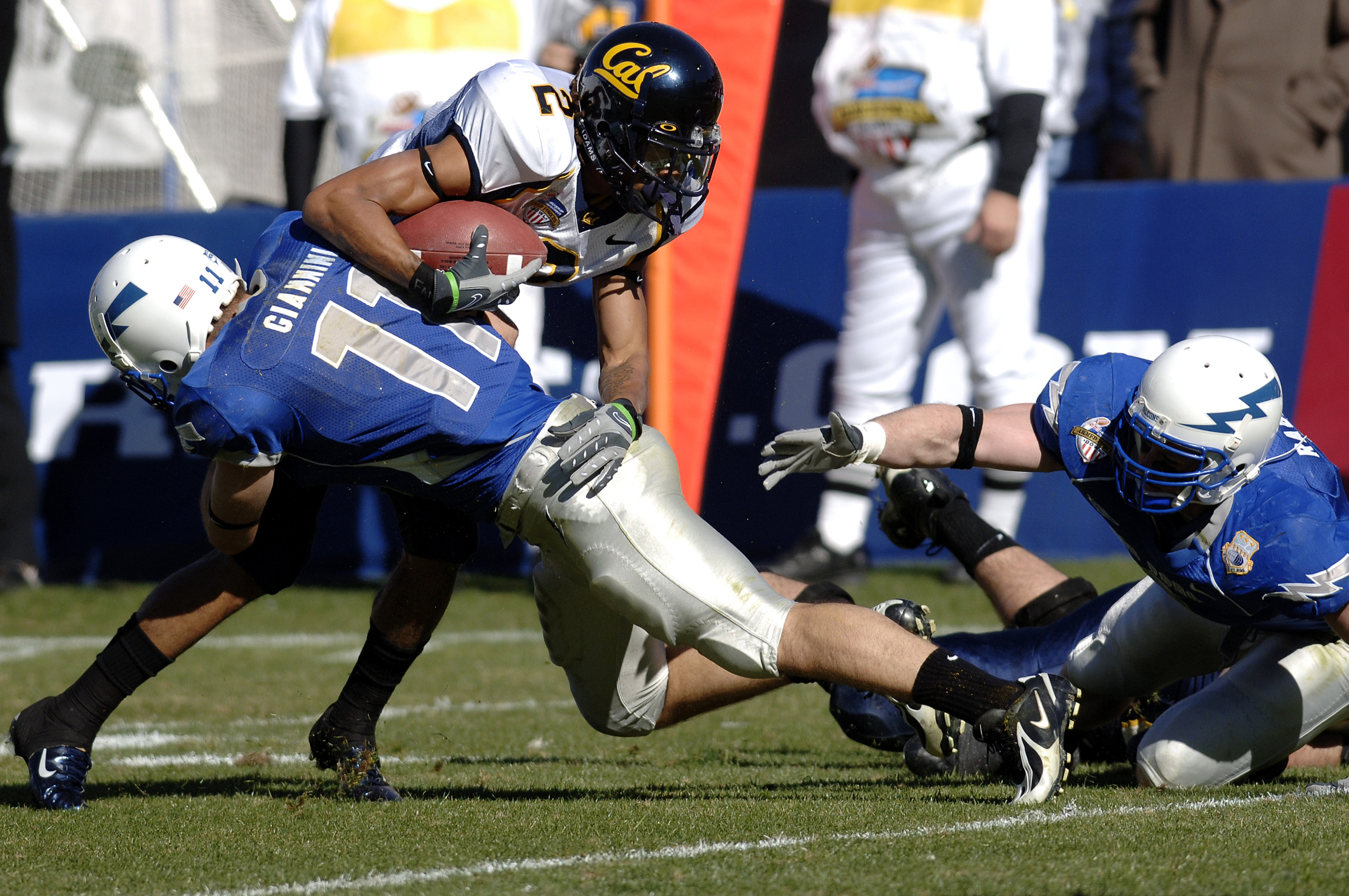
On offense during the 2007 Armed Forces Bowl.

The California Golden Bears college football team competes as part of the National Collegiate Athletic Association (NCAA) Division I Football Bowl Subdivision (FBS), representing the University of California, Berkeley in the Atlantic Coast Conference. Since the establishment of the team in 1886, California has appeared in 26 bowl games, including eight appearances in the Rose Bowl Game. Their latest bowl appearance was the 2025 Hawaii Bowl, where California was defeated by the Hawaii Rainbow Warriors 35–31, to give the Golden Bears an overall bowl record of 12–14–1 (.444).

== Key ==
General
†	Bowl game record attendance
‡	Former bowl game record attendance

Results
W	Win
L	Loss
T	Tie

== Bowl games ==
List of bowl games showing bowl played in, score, date, season, opponent, stadium, location, attendance and head coach (Note: Statistics correct as of 2019–20 NCAA football bowl games.)
#	Bowl	Score (Note: Results are sortable first by whether the result was a California win, loss or tie and then second by the margin of victory.)	Date	Season (Note: Links to the season article for the California team that competed in the bowl for that year.)	Opponent (Note: Links to the season article for the opponent that California competed against in the bowl for that year when available or to their general page when unavailable.)	Stadium	Location	Attendance	Head coach
1	Rose Bowl	W 28–0	January 1, 1921	1920	Ohio State Buckeyes	Tournament Park	Pasadena	42,000^{‡}	Andy Smith
2	Rose Bowl	T 0–0	January 2, 1922	1921	Washington & Jefferson Presidents	Tournament Park	Pasadena	40,000	Andy Smith
3	Rose Bowl	L 8–7	January 1, 1929	1928	Georgia Tech Yellow Jackets	Rose Bowl	Pasadena	66,604^{‡}	Nibs Price
4	Rose Bowl	W 13–0	January 1, 1938	1937	Alabama Crimson Tide	Rose Bowl	Pasadena	90,000^{‡}	Stub Allison
5	Rose Bowl	L 20–14	January 1, 1949	1948	Northwestern Wildcats	Rose Bowl	Pasadena	90,000	Pappy Waldorf
6	Rose Bowl	L 17–14	January 2, 1950	1949	Ohio State Buckeyes	Rose Bowl	Pasadena	100,963^{‡}	Pappy Waldorf
7	Rose Bowl	L 14–6	January 1, 1951	1950	Michigan Wolverines	Rose Bowl	Pasadena	98,939	Pappy Waldorf
8	Rose Bowl	L 38–12	January 1, 1959	1958	Iowa Hawkeyes	Rose Bowl	Pasadena	98,297	Pete Elliott
9	Garden State Bowl	L 28–17	December 15, 1979	1979	Temple Owls	Giants Stadium	East Rutherford	40,207	Roger Theder
10	Copper Bowl	W 17–15	December 31, 1990	1990	Wyoming Cowboys	Arizona Stadium	Tucson	36,340	Bruce Snyder
11	Florida Citrus Bowl	W 37–13	January 1, 1992	1991	Clemson Tigers	Citrus Bowl	Orlando	64,192	Bruce Snyder
12	Alamo Bowl	W 37–3	December 31, 1993	1993	Iowa Hawkeyes	Alamodome	San Antonio	45,716^{‡}	Keith Gilbertson
13	Aloha Bowl	L 42–38	December 25, 1996	1996	Navy Midshipmen	Aloha Stadium	Honolulu	43,380	Steve Mariucci
14	Insight Bowl	W 52–49	December 26, 2003	2003	Virginia Tech Hokies	Bank One Ballpark	Phoenix	42,364	Jeff Tedford
15	Holiday Bowl	L 45–31	December 30, 2004	2004	Texas Tech Red Raiders	Qualcomm Stadium	San Diego	66,222^{†}	Jeff Tedford
16	Las Vegas Bowl	W 35–28	December 22, 2005	2005	BYU Cougars	Sam Boyd Stadium	Las Vegas	40,053^{‡}	Jeff Tedford
17	Holiday Bowl	W 45–10	December 28, 2006	2006	Texas A&M Aggies	Qualcomm Stadium	San Diego	62,395	Jeff Tedford
18	Armed Forces Bowl	W 42–36	December 31, 2007	2007	Air Force Falcons	Amon G. Carter Stadium	Fort Worth	44,009^{†}	Jeff Tedford
19	Emerald Bowl	W 24–17	December 27, 2008	2008	Miami Hurricanes	AT&T Park	San Francisco	42,268^{†}	Jeff Tedford
20	Poinsettia Bowl	L 37–27	December 23, 2009	2009	Utah Utes	Qualcomm Stadium	San Diego	32,665	Jeff Tedford
21	Holiday Bowl	L 21–10	December 28, 2011	2011	Texas Longhorns	Qualcomm Stadium	San Diego	56,313	Jeff Tedford
22	Armed Forces Bowl	W 55–36	December 29, 2015	2015	Air Force Falcons	Amon G. Carter Stadium	Fort Worth	38,915	Sonny Dykes
23	Cheez-It Bowl	L 10–7 ^{OT}	December 26, 2018	2018	TCU Horned Frogs	Chase Field	Phoenix, Arizona	33,121	Justin Wilcox
24	Redbox Bowl	W 35–20	December 30, 2019	2019	Illinois Fighting Illini	Levi's Stadium	Santa Clara, California	34,177	Justin Wilcox
25	Independence Bowl	L 34–14	December 16, 2023	2023	Texas Tech Red Raiders	Independence Stadium	Shreveport, Louisiana	33,071	Justin Wilcox
26	LA Bowl	L 24–13	December 18, 2024	2024	UNLV	SoFi Stadium	Inglewood, California	24,420	Justin Wilcox
27	Hawaii Bowl	L 31–35	December 24, 2025	2025	Hawaii	Clarence T. C. Ching Athletics Complex	Honolulu, Hawaii	15,194	Nick Rolovich (interim)
