= 1979 California Golden Bears football team =

American college football season

1979 California Golden Bears football

Garden State Bowl, L 17–28 vs. Temple
- Conference: Pacific-10 Conference
- Record: 6–6 (5–4 Pac-10)
- Head coach: Roger Theder (2nd season)
- Offensive coordinator: Al Saunders
- Defensive coordinator: Gunther Cunningham (1st season)
- Captains: Ron Hill; Paul Jones
- Home stadium: California Memorial Stadium

1979 Pacific-10 Conference football standings
| | Conf. | | | | | Overall |
| Team | W | | L | | T | W | | L | | T |
|---|---|---|---|---|---|---|---|---|---|---|
| No. 2 USC $ | 6 | – | 0 | – | 1 | 11 | – | 0 | – | 1 |
| No. 11 Washington | 5 | – | 2 | – | 0 | 9 | – | 3 | – | 0 |
| Arizona | 4 | – | 3 | – | 0 | 6 | – | 5 | – | 1 |
| Oregon | 4 | – | 3 | – | 0 | 6 | – | 5 | – | 0 |
| California | 5 | – | 4 | – | 0 | 6 | – | 6 | – | 0 |
| Stanford | 3 | – | 3 | – | 1 | 5 | – | 5 | – | 1 |
| Arizona State * | 3 | – | 4 | – | 0 | 6 | – | 6 | – | 0 |
| UCLA | 3 | – | 4 | – | 0 | 5 | – | 6 | – | 0 |
| Washington State | 2 | – | 6 | – | 0 | 3 | – | 8 | – | 0 |
| Oregon State | 1 | – | 7 | – | 0 | 1 | – | 10 | – | 0 |
$ – Conference champion; * – Arizona State later forfeited 5 wins (3 in conference) due to NCAA sanctions; Rankings from AP Poll

The 1979 California Golden Bears football team represented the University of California, Berkeley during the 1979 NCAA Division I-A football season.

Cal claims a loss to Oregon as a victory, as "Oregon forfeited due to ineligible player."

== Schedule ==
| Date | Opponent | Site | Result | Attendance | Source |
|---|---|---|---|---|---|
| September 8 | at No. 18 Arizona State | Sun Devil Stadium; Tempe, AZ | W 17–9 | 71,005 | |
| September 15 | at Arizona | Arizona Stadium; Tucson, AZ | W 10–7 | 52,124 | |
| September 22 | San Jose State* | California Memorial Stadium; Berkeley, CA | W 13–10 | 35,000 | |
| September 29 | No. 11 Michigan* | California Memorial Stadium; Berkeley, CA | L 10–14 | 57,000 | |
| October 6 | at Oregon | Autzen Stadium; Eugene, OR | L 14–19 | 36,636 | |
| October 13 | Oregon State | California Memorial Stadium; Berkeley, CA | W 45–0 | 16,000 | |
| October 20 | at UCLA | Los Angeles Memorial Coliseum; Los Angeles, CA (rivalry) | L 27–28 | 40,546 | |
| October 27 | No. 3 USC | California Memorial Stadium; Berkeley, CA | L 14–24 | 76,780 | |
| November 3 | No. 16 Washington | California Memorial Stadium; Berkeley, CA | L 24–28 | 25,000 | |
| November 10 | at Washington State | Martin Stadium; Pullman, WA | W 45–13 | 22,055 | |
| November 17 | at Stanford | Stanford Stadium; Stanford, CA (Big Game) | W 21–14 | 85,577 | |
| December 15 | vs. No. 20 Temple* | Giants Stadium; East Rutherford, NJ (Garden State Bowl) | L 17–28 | 40,207 | |
*Non-conference game; Rankings from AP Poll released prior to the game

Note: Oregon forfeited victory due to use of ineligible player.

== Game summaries ==
=== At Washington State ===
| Team | 1 | 2 | 3 | 4 | Total |
|---|---|---|---|---|---|
| • California | 7 | 17 | 7 | 14 | 45 |
| Washington State | 6 | 0 | 0 | 7 | 13 |

- Date: November 11
- Location: Martin Stadium, Pullman, WA
- Game attendance: 22,155

Scoring summary
| 1 | CAL | Campbell 1 yard run (Luckhurst kick) | CAL 7-0 |
| 1 | WSU | DeSanto 22 yard field goal | CAL 7-3 |
| 1 | WSU | DeSanto 26 yard field goal | CAL 7-6 |
| 2 | CAL | Dixon 78 yard interception return (Luckhurst kick) | CAL 14-6 |
| 2 | CAL | Luckhurst 34 yard field goal | CAL 17-6 |
| 2 | CAL | Anderson 1 yard run (Luckhurst kick) | CAL 24-6 |
| 3 | CAL | Bouza 1 yard pass from Campbell (Luckhurst kick) | CAL 31-6 |
| 4 | CAL | Campbell 1 yard run (Luckhurst kick) | CAL 38-6 |
| 4 | CAL | Wright 2 yard pass from Anderson (Luckhurst kick) | CAL 45-6 |
| 4 | WSU | Maxey 25 yard pass from Casper (DeSanto kick) | CAL 45-13 |

=== At Stanford ===
California Golden Bears (5–5) at Stanford Cardinals (5–4–1)

| Quarter | 1 | 2 | 3 | 4 | Total |
|---|---|---|---|---|---|
| California | 14 | 0 | 0 | 7 | 21 |
| Stanford | 0 | 7 | 7 | 0 | 14 |

at Stanford Stadium, Stanford, California

- Date: November 17
- Game attendance: 85,577
- Referee: John Barger

Game information

First quarter

- CAL – Jack Rose 23-yard pass from Rich Campbell (Mick Luckhurst kick). California 7–0. Drive: 5 plays, 81 yards.
- CAL – Greg Woodard 28-yard pass from Rich Campbell (Mick Luckhurst kick). California 14–0. Drive: 6 plays, 82 yards.

Second quarter

- STAN – Vincent White 17-yard pass from Turk Schonert (Ken Naber kick). California 14–7. Drive: 13 plays, 82 yards.

Third quarter

- STAN – Andre Tyler 16-yard pass from Turk Schonert (Ken Naber kick). Tie 14–14. Drive: 5 plays, 32 yards.

Fourth quarter

- CAL – Jack Rose 17-yard pass from Rich Campbell (Mick Luckhurst kick). California 21–14. Drive:

Top passers

- CAL – Rich Campbell – 23/33, 315 yards, 3 TD, int
- STAN – Turk Schonert – 22/32, 225 yards, 2 TD

Top rushers

- CAL – Paul Jones – 24 rushes, 92 yards
- STAN – Vincent White – 10 rushes, 26 yards

Top receivers

- CAL – Jack Rose – 8 receptions, 121 yards, 2 TD
- STAN – Ken Margerum – 6 receptions, 61 yards

Cal stopped Stanford on the two-yard line with 40 seconds left to claim victory.

== Personnel ==
1979 California Golden Bears football team roster
Players
Coaches
Offense

| Pos. | # | Name | Class |
|---|---|---|---|
| QB | | Eric Anderson |
| C | 54 | Rick Anderson | Sr |
| OL | | Brian Bailey |
| RB | | Allen Blackmon |
| WR | | Matt Bouza |
| WR | | Michael Buggs |
| QB | 19 | Rich Campbell | Jr |
| QB | 11 | Rick Disney | Jr |
| WR | 99 | Floyd Eddings | Jr |
| QB | | Drew Field |
| OL | | Mike Harmon |
| OL | | Dave Heck |
| RB | | Paul Jones (C) |
| RB | | Edgardo Mixco |
| RB | | Dave Palmer |
| WR | | Tyrone Portee |
| WR | 88 | Jack Rose | Sr |
| TE | | Joe Rose |
| OT | 73 | Harvey Salem | Fr |
| RB | | Dave Sarnas |
| WR | 18 | Holden Smith | Jr |
| OL | | Bruce Sorenson |
| TE | | Don Sprague |
| RB | 31 | John Tuggle | Fr |
| WR | 6 | Greg Woodard | Fr |
| RB | | Tyran Wright |

Defense

| Pos. | # | Name | Class |
|---|---|---|---|
| DB | | Ahmad Anderson |
| LB | 38 | Greg Bracelin | Sr |
| DT | 90 | Reggie Camp | Fr |
| DB | | Darnell Chapman |
| DB | 27 | Ron Coccimiglio | Jr |
| LB | | Rich Dixon |
| DL | | Pat Graham |
| LB | | Ron Hill |
| LB | 55 | Stan Holloway | Sr |
| DL | | Kirk Karacozoff |
| LB | | Ulysses Madison |
| DL | | Dupre Marshall |
| DT | 70 | Daryle Skaugstad | Sr |
| DT | 96 | Rich Stachowski | Fr |
| DB | 2 | Anthony Washington | Sr |
| DB | | Fred Williams |

Special teams

| Pos. | # | Name | Class |
|---|---|---|---|
| K | 1 | Joe Cooper | So |
| K | 45 | Mick Luckhurst | Jr |

Head coach

- Roger Theder

Coordinators/assistant coaches

Legend

- (C) Team captain
- (S) Suspended
- (I) Ineligible
- Injured
- Redshirt
