= 1979 Sun Bowl =

American college football game

Washington Huskies	Texas Longhorns
(9–2)	(9–2)
Pac-10	SWC
14	7
Head coach: Don James	Head coach: Fred Akers
AP / Coaches; 13 / 13	AP / Coaches; 11 / 11
	1	2	3	4	Total
Washington	0	14	0	0	14
Texas	0	7	0	0	7
- Date: December 22, 1979
- Season: 1979
- Stadium: Sun Bowl
- Location: El Paso, Texas
- MVP: Paul Skansi, WR, Washington
- Favorite: Texas by 7
- Referee: Donald Safrit (ACC)
- Attendance: 33,412

United States TV coverage
- Network: CBS
- Announcers: Pat Summerall; Tom Brookshier; Frank Glieber

The 1979 Sun Bowl was a college football postseason bowl game between the Texas Longhorns and the Washington Huskies, played on Saturday, December 22, in El Paso, Texas.

== Background ==
The Huskies were the runner-up in the Pacific-10 Conference, behind USC. The Longhorns had lost two games by a combined total of nine points, with the two losses costing them a Southwest Conference title. This was Washington's first Sun Bowl and Texas' second straight.

== Game summary ==
Husky defensive lineman Stafford Mays recovered quarterback Rick McIvor's fumble late in the first quarter in Longhorn territory. Ten seconds into the second quarter, junior quarterback Tom Flick threw an 18-yard touchdown pass to freshman Paul Skansi for the first score. On the second play of the Longhorns' ensuing drive, strong safety Greg Grimes recovered McIvor's fumble at the 25-yard line, giving Washington another shot at scoring. Five plays later, Willis Ray Mackey scored on a touchdown run to make it 14–0. But on Washington's next possession, Flick fumbled the ball to defensive lineman Kenneth Sims, who recovered it in Texas territory. Forty three yards later, Donnie Little threw a touchdown pass to Brad Beck with 3:10 to go in the half.

In gusty winds, the rest of the game was a defensive affair, with the Longhorns' fumbles in the first half proving costly. Skansi caught five passes for 52 yards and was named MVP. Mays had 12 tackles, a fumble recovery, and two sacks.

== Aftermath ==
The Huskies returned to the Sun Bowl three times (1986, 1995, 2002), but lost all three; the Longhorns returned in 1982 and 1994.

== Statistics ==
Statistics	Washington	Texas
First downs	11	16
Net Yards Rushing	98	199
Net Yards Passing	67	37
Total offense	165	236
Passes Intercepted	1	1
Punting-Average	7–39.1	4–39.0
Fumbles-Lost	1-1	3–3
Penalties-Yards	4–38	4-30
