= 1979 USC Trojans football team =

American college football season

1979 USC Trojans football

National champion (Football Research) Pac-10 champion Rose Bowl champion

Rose Bowl, W 17–16 vs. Ohio State
- Conference: Pacific-10 Conference

Ranking
- Coaches: No. 2
- AP: No. 2
- Record: 11–0–1 (6–0–1 Pac-10)
- Head coach: John Robinson (4th season)
- Captains: Dennis Johnson; Charles White
- Home stadium: Los Angeles Memorial Coliseum

1979 Pacific-10 Conference football standings
	Conf.					Overall
Team	W		L		T	W		L		T
No. 2 USC $	6	–	0	–	1	11	–	0	–	1
No. 11 Washington	5	–	2	–	0	9	–	3	–	0
Arizona	4	–	3	–	0	6	–	5	–	1
Oregon	4	–	3	–	0	6	–	5	–	0
California	5	–	4	–	0	6	–	6	–	0
Stanford	3	–	3	–	1	5	–	5	–	1
Arizona State *	3	–	4	–	0	6	–	6	–	0
UCLA	3	–	4	–	0	5	–	6	–	0
Washington State	2	–	6	–	0	3	–	8	–	0
Oregon State	1	–	7	–	0	1	–	10	–	0
$ – Conference champion; * – Arizona State later forfeited 5 wins (3 in conference) due to NCAA sanctions; Rankings from AP Poll

The 1979 USC Trojans football team represented the University of Southern California (USC) in the 1979 NCAA Division I-A football season. In their fourth year under head coach John Robinson, the Trojans compiled an 11–0–1 record (6–0–1 against conference opponents), won the Pacific-10 Conference (Pac-10) championship, and outscored their opponents by a combined total of 389 to 171. The team was ranked #2 in both the final AP Poll and the final UPI Coaches Poll.

Quarterback Paul McDonald led the team in passing, completing 164 of 264 passes for 2,223 yards with 18 touchdowns and six interceptions. Charles White led the team in rushing with 332 carries for 2,050 yards and 19 touchdowns. Danny Garcia led the team in receiving with 29 catches for 492 yards and three touchdowns.

The team was named national champion by the College Football Researchers Association, an NCAA-designated major selector.

== Schedule ==
Date	Opponent	Rank	Site	TV	Result	Attendance	Source
September 8	at Texas Tech*	No. 1	Jones Stadium; Lubbock, TX		W 21–7	52,991	
September 15	at Oregon State	No. 1	Parker Stadium; Corvallis, OR	ONTV	W 42–5	32,000	
September 22	Minnesota*	No. 1	Los Angeles Memorial Coliseum; Los Angeles, CA		W 48–14	61,766	
September 29	at No. 20 LSU*	No. 1	Tiger Stadium; Baton Rouge, LA		W 17–12	78,322	
October 6	Washington State	No. 1	Los Angeles Memorial Coliseum; Los Angeles, CA		W 50–21	55,117	
October 13	Stanford^{†}	No. 1	Los Angeles Memorial Coliseum; Los Angeles, CA (rivalry)		T 21–21	76,067	
October 20	at No. 9 Notre Dame*	No. 4	Notre Dame Stadium; Notre Dame, IN (Jeweled Shillelagh)	ABC	W 42–23	59,075	
October 27	at California	No. 3	California Memorial Stadium; Berkeley, CA		W 24–14	76,780	
November 3	Arizona	No. 3	Los Angeles Memorial Coliseum; Los Angeles, CA		W 34–7	62,054	
November 10	at No. 15 Washington	No. 4	Husky Stadium; Seattle, WA	ABC	W 24–17	60,527	
November 24	UCLA	No. 4	Los Angeles Memorial Coliseum; Los Angeles, CA (Victory Bell)	KABC	W 49–14	88,214	
January 1, 1980	vs. No. 1 Ohio State*	No. 3	Rose Bowl; Pasadena, CA (Rose Bowl)	NBC	W 17–16	105,526	
*Non-conference game; ^{†}Homecoming; Rankings from AP Poll released prior to the game; Source:

== Game summaries ==
=== At Oregon State ===
Paul McDonald completed eight of nine passes for 108 yards and two touchdowns in just one half of action while Charles White watched from the sidelines with an injured shoulder. McDonald led the Trojans to touchdowns on their first five possessions before he and the rest of USC starters sat for the second half.

=== Stanford ===
- Charles White 32 rushes, 221 yards

=== At Notre Dame ===
#4 USC Trojans (5–0–1) at #9 Notre Dame Fighting Irish (4–1)

Quarter	1	2	3	4	Total
USC	0	7	14	21	42
Notre Dame	0	7	7	9	23

at Notre Dame Stadium, South Bend, Indiana

- Date: October 20
- Game attendance: 59,075
- TV announcers (ABC): Keith Jackson & Frank Broyles
- Eugene Register-Guard. 1979 Oct 21.

Game information

First quarter

- No scoring

Second quarter

- USC – Garcia 12-yard pass from McDonald (Hipp kick). USC 7–0.
- ND – Ferguson 1-yard run (Male kick). Tie 7–7.

Third quarter

- USC – White 3-yard run (Hipp kick). USC 14–7
- USC – White 1-yard run (Hipp kick). USC 21–7.
- ND – Ferguson 21-yard run (Male kick). USC 21–14.

Fourth quarter

- USC – Williams 12-yard pass from McDonald (Hipp kick). USC 28–14.
- ND – Stone 2-yard run (kick failed). USC 28–20.
- USC – White 1-yard run (Hipp kick). USC 35–20.
- USC – White 1-yard run (Hipp kick). USC 42–20.
- ND – Male 42-yard field goal. USC 42–23.

Top rushers

- USC – Charles White – 44 rushes, 261 yards, 4 TD

=== At California ===
#3 USC Trojans (6–0–1) at California Golden Bears (4–3)

Quarter	1	2	3	4	Total
USC	7	0	0	17	24
California	0	7	0	7	14

at California Memorial Stadium, Berkeley, California

- Date: October 27
- Game attendance: 76,780

Game information

First quarter

- USC – James Hunter 3-yard pass from Paul McDonald (Eric Hipp kick). USC 7–0.

Second quarter

- CAL – Darnell Chapman 74-yard blocked field goal return (Mick Luckhurst kick). Tie 7–7.

Third quarter

- No scoring

Fourth quarter

- USC – Charles White 2-yard run (Eric Hipp kick). USC 14–7.
- CAL – Matt Bouza 13-yard pass from Rich Campbell (Mick Luckhurst kick), 5:24. Tie 14–14.
- USC – Eric Hipp 45-yard field goal, 2:46. USC 17–7. Drive: 9 plays, 80 yards.
- USC – Charles White 5-yard run (Eric Hipp kick), 0:02. USC 24–7.

Top passers

- USC – Paul McDonald – 15/35, 212 yards, TD
- CAL – Rich Campbell – 24/40, 266 yards, TD

Top rushers

- USC – Charles White – 44 rushes, 198 yards, 2 TD
- CAL – Paul Jones – 13 rushes, 36 yards

Top receivers

- USC – Ray Butler – 4 receptions, 56 yards
- CAL – Matt Bouza – 7 receptions, 101 yards, TD

=== At Washington ===
#4 USC Trojans (8–0–1) at #15 Washington Huskies (7–2)

Quarter	1	2	3	4	Total
USC	0	10	7	7	24
Washington	3	0	7	7	17

at Husky Stadium, Seattle, Washington

- Date: November 10
- Game attendance: 60,527
- TV announcers (ABC): Keith Jackson & Frank Broyles

Game information

First quarter

- WASH – Lansford 30-yard field goal. Washington 3–0.

Second quarter

- USC – Garcia 8-yard pass from McDonald (Hipp kick). USC 7–3.
- USC – Hipp 31-yard field goal. USC 10–3.

Third quarter

- USC – K. Williams 19-yard pass from McDonald (Hipp kick). USC 17–3.
- WASH – Flick 1-yard run (Lansford kick). USC 17–10.

Fourth quarter

- WASH – Skansi 12-yard pass from Flick (Lansford kick). Tie 17–17.
- USC – M. Allen 10-yard run (Hipp kick). USC 24–17.

Top rushers

- USC – Charles White – 38 rushes, 243 yards

=== Vs. UCLA ===
UCLA Bruins (5–5) vs. #4 USC Trojans (9–0–1)

Quarter	1	2	3	4	Total
UCLA	0	0	7	7	14
USC	14	21	7	7	49

at Los Angeles Memorial Coliseum, Los Angeles, California

- Date: November 24
- Game attendance: 88,214

Game information

First quarter

- USC – Charles White 2-yard run (Eric Hipp kick). USC 7–0.
- USC – Ronnie Lott 30-yard interception return (Eric Hipp kick). USC 14–0.

Second quarter

- USC – Charles White 1-yard run (Eric Hipp kick). USC 21–0.
- USC – Charles White 26-yard run (Eric Hipp kick). USC 28–0.
- USC – Charles White 2-yard run (Eric Hipp kick). USC 35–0.

Third quarter

- UCLA – Jo-Jo Townsell 79-yard pass from Rick Bashore (Peter Boermeester kick). USC 35–7.
- USC – Vic Rakhshani 5-yard pass from Paul McDonald (Eric Hipp kick). USC 42–7.

Fourth quarter

- UCLA – Jo-Jo Townsell 5-yard pass from Rick Bashore (Peter Boermeester kick). USC 42–14.
- USC – Michael Hayes 54-yard run (Eric Hipp kick). USC 49–14.

Top passers

- UCLA – Rick Bashore – 9/17, 224 yards, 2 TD, INT
- USC – Paul McDonald – 17/23, 199 yards, TD, INT

Top rushers

- UCLA – Freeman McNeil – 30 rushes, 120 yards
- USC – Charles White – 35 rushes, 194 yards, 4 TD

Top receivers

- UCLA – Jo-Jo Townsell – 5 receptions, 129 yards, 2 TD
- USC – Rod Garcia – 3 receptions, 42 yards

=== Rose Bowl (vs. Ohio State) ===
- Charles White 39 rushes, 247 yards

== Roster ==
1979 USC Trojans football team roster
Players
Coaches
Offense

Pos.	#	Name	Class
RB	33	Marcus Allen	So
TE	89	Hoby Brenner	Jr
G	71	Brad Budde	Sr
WR	86	Ray Butler	Sr
RB		Paul DiLulo
C	68	Chris Foote	Sr
G	64	Roy Foster	So
WR		Dan Garcia
RB		Anthony Gibson
RB		Michael Harper
RB		Michael Hayes
TE	85	James Hunter	Jr
RB		Ricky Johnson
RB		Doug MacKenzie
C	52	Brad Green	Sr
QB	16	Paul McDonald	Sr
WR		Malcolm Moore
OT	72	Don Mosebar	Fr
OT	77	Anthony Muñoz	Sr
WR	26	Danny Garcia	Sr
WR		Vic Rakhshani
QB		Scott Tinsley
OT	68	Keith Van Horne	Jr
RB	12	Charles White	Sr
WR	8	Kevin Williams	Jr

Defense

Pos.	#	Name	Class
DL		George Achica
LB	51	Chip Banks	So
DT	94	Bryon Darby	Fr
S	47	Joey Browner	Fr
LB	54	Steve Busick	Jr
LB	87	August Curley	Fr
DL		Byron Darby
DL		Dennis Edwards
CB	40	Jeff Fisher	Jr
LB		Riki Gray
LB	56	Dennis Johnson	Sr
DT	96	Myron Lapka	Sr
S	42	Ronnie Lott	Jr
LB	58	Mike McDonald	Sr
LB	57	Larry McGrew	Sr
DB		Kenney Moore
LB	81	Eric Scoggins	Jr
DB	49	Dennis Smith	Jr
DL		Ty Sperling
DT	93	Kelly Thomas	Fr
DB	23	Herb Ward

Special teams

Pos.	#	Name	Class
K		Eric Hipp
P		Dave Pryor

Head coach

- John Robinson

Coordinators/assistant coaches

Legend

- (C) Team captain
- (S) Suspended
- (I) Ineligible
- Injured
- Redshirt

== 1979 team players in the NFL ==
- Marcus Allen
- Chip Banks
- Hoby Brenner
- Joey Browner
- Brad Budde
- Steve Busick
- Ray Butler
- Dennis Johnson
- Myron Lapka
- Ronnie Lott
- Jeff Fisher
- Chris Foote
- Roy Foster
- Bruce Matthews
- Paul McDonald
- Larry McGrew
- Don Mosebar
- Anthony Muñoz
- Eric Scoggins
- Dennis Smith
- Keith Van Horne
- Charles White

== Awards and honors ==
- Brad Budde, Lombardi Award
- Charles White, Heisman Trophy
- Charles White, Maxwell Award
- Charles White, Walter Camp Award
