= 1979 Oregon Ducks football team =

American college football season

1979 Oregon Ducks football
- Conference: Pacific-10 Conference
- Record: 6–5 (4–3 Pac-10)
- Head coach: Rich Brooks (3rd season)
- Offensive coordinator: John Becker (3rd season)
- Captain: Game captains
- Home stadium: Autzen Stadium

1979 Pacific-10 Conference football standings
	Conf.					Overall
Team	W		L		T	W		L		T
No. 2 USC $	6	–	0	–	1	11	–	0	–	1
No. 11 Washington	5	–	2	–	0	9	–	3	–	0
Arizona	4	–	3	–	0	6	–	5	–	1
Oregon	4	–	3	–	0	6	–	5	–	0
California	5	–	4	–	0	6	–	6	–	0
Stanford	3	–	3	–	1	5	–	5	–	1
Arizona State *	3	–	4	–	0	6	–	6	–	0
UCLA	3	–	4	–	0	5	–	6	–	0
Washington State	2	–	6	–	0	3	–	8	–	0
Oregon State	1	–	7	–	0	1	–	10	–	0
$ – Conference champion; * – Arizona State later forfeited 5 wins (3 in conference) due to NCAA sanctions; Rankings from AP Poll

The 1979 Oregon Ducks football team represented the University of Oregon during the 1979 NCAA Division I-A football season. Playing as a member of the Pacific-10 Conference (Pac-10), the team was led by head coach Rich Brooks, in his third year, and played their home games at Autzen Stadium in Eugene, Oregon. They finished the season with a record of six wins and five losses (6–5 overall, 4–3 in the Pac-10). It was Oregon's first winning season since 1970.

Cal claims a loss to Oregon as a victory, as "Oregon forfeited due to ineligible player."

== Schedule ==
Date	Opponent	Site	Result	Attendance	Source
September 8	at Colorado*	Folsom Field; Boulder, CO	W 33–19	44,274	
September 15	at No. 10 Michigan State*	Spartan Stadium; East Lansing, MI	L 17–41	76,123	
September 22	No. 12 Washington	Autzen Stadium; Eugene, OR (rivalry)	L 17–21	42,500	
September 29	at No. 10 Purdue*	Ross–Ade Stadium; West Lafayette, IN	L 7–13	69,327	
October 6	California	Autzen Stadium; Eugene, OR	W 19–14	36,636	
October 13	at Arizona	Arizona Stadium; Tucson, AZ	L 13–24	47,681	
October 20	Air Force*	Autzen Stadium; Eugene, OR	W 17–9	28,457	
October 27	at Washington State	Martin Stadium; Pullman, WA	W 37–26	18,650	
November 10	at Stanford	Stanford Stadium; Stanford, CA	W 16–7	45,219	
November 17	UCLA	Autzen Stadium; Eugene, OR	L 0–35	41,235	
November 24	Oregon State	Autzen Stadium; Eugene, OR (Civil War)	W 24–3	36,536	
*Non-conference game; Rankings from AP Poll released prior to the game

== Game summaries ==
=== Oregon State ===
Team	1	2	3	4	Total
Oregon St	0	0	0	3	3
• Oregon	14	7	3	0	24

- Date: November 29
- Location: Autzen Stadium, Eugene, Oregon

Scoring summary
1	8:42	Oregon	Ogburn 4-yard run (English kick)	Oregon 7-0
1	:02	Oregon	Jackson 35-yard run (English kick)	Oregon 14-0
2	:20	Oregon	Young 11-yard pass from Ogburn (English kick)	Oregon 21-0
3	:39	Oregon	Jollymour 38-yard field goal	Oregon 24-0
4	12:34	Oregon St	Wafford 37-yard field goal	Oregon 24-3

== Roster ==
1979 Oregon Ducks football team roster
Players
Coaches
Offense

Pos.	#	Name	Class

Defense

Pos.	#	Name	Class
DT	92	Terry Dion	Sr
DE	90	Neil Elshire	Sr
LB	16	Bryan Hinkle	Jr

Special teams

Pos.	#	Name	Class

Head coach

- Rich Brooks (3rd year)

Coordinators/assistant coaches

- John Becker (OC)

Legend

- (C) Team captain
- (S) Suspended
- (I) Ineligible
- Injured
- Redshirt

- Not listed: Bryan Hinkle, Scott Setterlund
