= 1979 Oregon State Beavers football team =

American college football season

1979 Oregon State Beavers football
- Conference: Pacific-10 Conference
- Record: 2–9 (2–6 Pac-10)
- Head coach: Craig Fertig (4th season)
- Home stadium: Parker Stadium

1979 Pacific-10 Conference football standings
	Conf.					Overall
Team	W		L		T	W		L		T
No. 2 USC $	6	–	0	–	1	11	–	0	–	1
No. 11 Washington	5	–	2	–	0	9	–	3	–	0
Arizona	4	–	3	–	0	6	–	5	–	1
Oregon	4	–	3	–	0	6	–	5	–	0
California	5	–	4	–	0	6	–	6	–	0
Stanford	3	–	3	–	1	5	–	5	–	1
Arizona State *	3	–	4	–	0	6	–	6	–	0
UCLA	3	–	4	–	0	5	–	6	–	0
Washington State	2	–	6	–	0	3	–	8	–	0
Oregon State	1	–	7	–	0	1	–	10	–	0
$ – Conference champion; * – Arizona State later forfeited 5 wins (3 in conference) due to NCAA sanctions; Rankings from AP Poll

The 1979 Oregon State Beavers football team represented Oregon State University as a member of the Pacific-10 Conference (Pac-10) during the 1979 NCAA Division I-A football season. In their fourth and final season under head coach Craig Fertig, the Beavers compiled an overall record of 2–9 record with a mark of 2–6 in conference play placing last out of ten teams in the Pac-10, and were outscored 396 to 147. The team played its five home games on campus at Parker Stadium in Corvallis.

Fertig was fired in October, in the second year of a three-year contract at $33,696 per year. He coached through the end of the season, and lost the finale to Oregon 24–3 in the Civil War, the Beavers' fifth straight loss to the Ducks.

== Schedule ==
Date	Opponent	Site	Result	Attendance	Source
September 8	at New Mexico*	University Stadium; Albuquerque, NM	L 16–35	27,525	
September 15	No. 1 USC	Parker Stadium; Corvallis, OR	L 5–42	32,000	
September 22	at Kansas State*	KSU Stadium; Manhattan, KS	L 16–22	32,600	
September 29	Arizona State	Parker Stadium; Corvallis, OR	W 0–45 (Arizona State forfeit)	20,000	
October 6	at No. 7 Washington	Husky Stadium; Seattle, WA	L 0–41	49,881	
October 13	at California	California Memorial Stadium; Berkeley, CA	L 0–45	29,000	
October 20	San Jose State*	Parker Stadium; Corvallis, OR	L 14–24	11,000	
October 27	Stanford	Parker Stadium; Corvallis, OR	W 33–31	16,000	
November 3	Washington State	Parker Stadium; Corvallis, OR	L 42–45	21,500	
November 17	at Arizona	Arizona Stadium; Tucson, AZ	L 18–42	45,162	
November 24	at Oregon	Autzen Stadium; Eugene, OR (Civil War)	L 3–24	36,536	
*Non-conference game; Rankings from AP Poll released prior to the game
