= 1979 Arizona Wildcats football team =

American college football season

1979 Arizona Wildcats football

Fiesta Bowl, L 10–16 vs. Pittsburgh
- Conference: Pacific-10 Conference
- Record: 6–5–1 (4–3 Pac-10)
- Head coach: Tony Mason (3rd season)
- Home stadium: Arizona Stadium

1979 Pacific-10 Conference football standings
	Conf.					Overall
Team	W		L		T	W		L		T
No. 2 USC $	6	–	0	–	1	11	–	0	–	1
No. 11 Washington	5	–	2	–	0	9	–	3	–	0
Arizona	4	–	3	–	0	6	–	5	–	1
Oregon	4	–	3	–	0	6	–	5	–	0
California	5	–	4	–	0	6	–	6	–	0
Stanford	3	–	3	–	1	5	–	5	–	1
Arizona State *	3	–	4	–	0	6	–	6	–	0
UCLA	3	–	4	–	0	5	–	6	–	0
Washington State	2	–	6	–	0	3	–	8	–	0
Oregon State	1	–	7	–	0	1	–	10	–	0
$ – Conference champion; * – Arizona State later forfeited 5 wins (3 in conference) due to NCAA sanctions; Rankings from AP Poll

The 1979 Arizona Wildcats football team represented the University of Arizona in the Pacific-10 Conference (Pac-10) during the 1979 NCAA Division I-A football season. In their third and final season under head coach Tony Mason, the Wildcats compiled a 6–5–1 record (4–3 in Pac-10, third), lost to Pittsburgh in the Fiesta Bowl, and outscored their opponents, 244 to 243. The team played its home games on campus at Arizona Stadium in Tucson, Arizona.

Arizona's statistical leaders included Jim Krohn with 1,094 passing yards, Hubert Oliver with 1,021 rushing yards, and Tim Holmes with 319 receiving yards. Linebacker Sam Giangardella led the team with 112 total tackles.

Mason was dismissed as coach in April 1980 in the wake of an alleged corruption scandal involving the program.

== Before the season ==
The Wildcats completed the 1978 season with a record of 5–6 in their inaugural year as a member of the Pac-10. With many players returning for the 1979 season, Mason believed that Arizona would be ready to compete in the Pac-10 and attempt to contend for a bowl appearance.

== Schedule ==
Date	Opponent	Site	TV	Result	Attendance	Source
September 1	Colorado State*	Arizona Stadium; Tucson, AZ		W 33–17	50,323	
September 8	at Washington State	Joe Albi Stadium; Spokane, WA		W 22–7	26,753	
September 15	California	Arizona Stadium; Tucson, AZ		L 7–10	52,124	
September 22	Texas Tech*	Arizona Stadium; Tucson, AZ		T 14–14	40,476	
September 29	San Jose State*	Arizona Stadium; Tucson, AZ		W 38–18	48,061	
October 13	Oregon	Arizona Stadium; Tucson, AZ		W 24–13	47,681	
October 20	Stanford	Arizona Stadium; Tucson, AZ		L 10–30	55,217	
November 3	at No. 3 USC	Los Angeles Memorial Coliseum; Los Angeles, CA		L 7–34	62,054	
November 10	at San Diego State*	San Diego Stadium; San Diego, CA		L 10–42	38,581	
November 17	Oregon State^{†}	Arizona Stadium; Tucson, AZ		W 42–18	45,162	
November 24	at Arizona State	Sun Devil Stadium; Tempe, AZ (rivalry)		W 27–24	70,947	
December 25	vs. No. 10 Pittsburgh*	Sun Devil Stadium; Tempe, AZ (Fiesta Bowl)	NBC	L 10–16	55,347	
*Non-conference game; ^{†}Homecoming; Rankings from AP Poll released prior to the game

== Game summaries ==
=== Colorado State ===
Arizona began the year at home against Colorado State, who was a former conference opponent for the Wildcats in their later WAC years prior to leaving after the 1977 season. The Wildcats easily defeated the Rams to start the season with a win.

=== Texas Tech ===
The Wildcats met Texas Tech for the ninth consecutive season. In a back and forth battle, both teams settled for a tie (overtime did not yet exist at the time). It was the first tie in the series since 1936.

=== San Diego State ===
Arizona traveled to San Diego to face the Aztecs. It was the second consecutive game that the Wildcats played in California (they had lost at USC the week before). San Diego State had replaced Arizona as a member of the WAC before the season.

The Wildcats were no match for the Aztecs as they gave up six touchdowns in an ugly loss. To date, this remains Arizona’s most recent loss to San Diego State on the road.

=== Arizona State ===
In the rivalry game against Arizona State, the Wildcats did not have to deal with former ASU coach Frank Kush, who was dismissed earlier in the season due to an incident that involved one of his players. Kush had dominated the Wildcats since he became coach in 1958, which led to the Sun Devils gaining the upper hand in the rivalry.

In the game itself, both teams were tied in the closing seconds. Wildcat kicker Brett Weber attempted a potential game-winning field goal, but missed it as time expired which would have led to the rivalry’s first-ever tie (which would not happen until 1987). However, ASU was penalized for going offside, in which it gave Weber a second chance. Weber then successfully converted the kick to give the Wildcats their first win in Tempe since 1961. Weber's kick was known to Wildcat fans as “The Kick”. The win guaranteed the Wildcats of a winning record for the first time in the Mason era.

=== Pittsburgh (Fiesta Bowl) ===
In their first bowl game since 1968, Arizona took on Pittsburgh in the Fiesta Bowl. Late in the game with the Wildcats trailing, they attempted a late rally but ultimately came up short. The Wildcats never led at any point during the game. They would not return to the Fiesta Bowl again until 1994.

== Season notes ==
- This season included Mason's only win against ASU and his only bowl appearance as Arizona coach. It was also his only winning season with the Wildcats.
- The Wildcats played Texas Tech for the ninth consecutive season. Prior to Arizona joining the Pac-10, fans had joked that by scheduling the Red Raiders, it was a sign that Texas Tech would become a member of the WAC (Arizona had the Red Raiders booked on their 1978 and 1979 schedules while they were still in WAC). Ultimately, that did not happen as Texas Tech remained a member of the now-defunct Southwest Conference until 1996 and being part of the Big 12 Conference ever since. Arizona stopped scheduling Texas Tech prior to the 1980 season and did not add them to their future schedules until 1988.
- From mid-September to late October, Arizona played five consecutive home games. This would not happen again until 1988.
- The Wildcats would not lose again to San Diego State until 2021. The two teams would not meet each other on the field again until 1997.
- Arizona's win over Arizona State was the second and final win against the Sun Devils in the 1970s (the first occurred in 1974).
- After losing the Fiesta Bowl, the Wildcats would finally win their first bowl game in 1986.

== After the season ==
Despite the Wildcats losing in the Fiesta Bowl, the future seemed bright for the program. However, in the spring of 1980, during the offseason, Mason was let go after it was determined that he allegedly committed recruiting fraud by misusing money for paying players. After conducting a national coaching search, the Wildcats hired Tulane’s Larry Smith to lead the team.

== Personnel ==
1979 Arizona Wildcats football team roster
Players
Coaches
Offense

Pos.	#	Name	Class
QB	9	Bob Carter	So
RB	48	Larry Heater	Sr
WR	80	Al Hill	Jr
QB	5	Jim Krohn (C)	Sr
RB	44	Hubie Oliver	Jr

Defense

Pos.	#	Name	Class
DT	98	Robert Cobb	Jr
DE	89	John Crawford	Sr
DT	95	Cleveland Crosby	Sr
LB	56	Sam Giangardella	Jr
CB	32	Marcellus Greene	Jr
DT	92	Mike Robinson	Jr

Special teams

Pos.	#	Name	Class
K		Brett Weber
K	3	Bill Zivic	So

Head coach

- Tony Mason

Coordinators/assistant coaches

- Bob Davie
  Linebackers
- Tom Roggeman
  Defensive line

Legend

- (C) Team captain
- (S) Suspended
- (I) Ineligible
- Injured
- Redshirt
