= 1979 UCLA Bruins football team =

American college football season

1979 UCLA Bruins football
- Conference: Pacific-10 Conference
- Record: 5–6 (3–4 Pac-10)
- Head coach: Terry Donahue (4th season)
- Defensive coordinator: Jed Hughes (3rd season)
- Home stadium: Los Angeles Memorial Coliseum

1979 Pacific-10 Conference football standings
	Conf.					Overall
Team	W		L		T	W		L		T
No. 2 USC $	6	–	0	–	1	11	–	0	–	1
No. 11 Washington	5	–	2	–	0	9	–	3	–	0
Arizona	4	–	3	–	0	6	–	5	–	1
Oregon	4	–	3	–	0	6	–	5	–	0
California	5	–	4	–	0	6	–	6	–	0
Stanford	3	–	3	–	1	5	–	5	–	1
Arizona State *	3	–	4	–	0	6	–	6	–	0
UCLA	3	–	4	–	0	5	–	6	–	0
Washington State	2	–	6	–	0	3	–	8	–	0
Oregon State	1	–	7	–	0	1	–	10	–	0
$ – Conference champion; * – Arizona State later forfeited 5 wins (3 in conference) due to NCAA sanctions; Rankings from AP Poll

The 1979 UCLA Bruins football team represented the University of California, Los Angeles (UCLA) as a member of the Pacific-10 Conference (Pac-10) during the 1979 NCAA Division I-A football season. Led by fourth-year head coach Terry Donahue, the Bruins compiled an overall record of 5–6 with a mark of 3–4 in conference play, tying for seventh place in the Pac-10. UCLA played home games at Los Angeles Memorial Coliseum in Los Angeles.

== Schedule ==
Date	Opponent	Rank	Site	Result	Attendance	Source
September 8	No. 16 Houston*		Los Angeles Memorial Coliseum; Los Angeles, CA	L 16–24	40,008	
September 15	No. 5 Purdue*		Los Angeles Memorial Coliseum; Los Angeles, CA	W 31–21	44,174	
September 22	at Wisconsin*	No. 20	Camp Randall Stadium; Madison, WI	W 37–12	78,830	
September 29	No. 14 Ohio State*	No. 17	Los Angeles Memorial Coliseum; Los Angeles, CA	L 13–17	47,228	
October 6	at Stanford		Stanford Stadium; Stanford, CA	L 24–27	70,205	
October 13	at Washington State		Martin Stadium; Pullman, WA	L 14–17	32,651	
October 20	California		Los Angeles Memorial Coliseum; Los Angeles, CA (rivalry)	W 28–27	40,546	
October 27	No. 20 Washington		Los Angeles Memorial Coliseum; Los Angeles, CA	L 14–34	35,757	
November 10	Arizona State		Los Angeles Memorial Coliseum; Los Angeles, CA	W 31–28	34,763	
November 17	at Oregon		Autzen Stadium; Eugene, OR	W 35–0	41,235	
November 24	at No. 4 USC		Los Angeles Memorial Coliseum; Los Angeles, CA (Victory Bell)	L 14–49	88,214	
*Non-conference game; Rankings from AP Poll released prior to the game

== Roster ==
1979 UCLA Bruins football team roster
Players
Coaches
Offense

Pos.	#	Name	Class
QB		Rick Bashore	Sr
G	72	Brent Boyd	Sr
WR		Michael Brant
RB		Glen Cannon
OL		Greg Christiansen
WR		Willie Curran
OL		Irv Eatman
RB		Anthony Edgar
G	77	Larry Lee	Jr
RB		Danny Lei
OL		Jim Main
RB	24	Freeman McNeil	Jr
RB		Blanchard Montgomery
RB		Jairo Penaranda
QB		Bernard Quarles
QB		Tom Ramsey
RB		Toa Saipale
OL		Luis Sharpe
G	66	John Tautolo	Jr
WR		Scott Tiesing
WR		Jo-Jo Townsell	Fr
WR		Dokie Williams
TE		Tim Wrightman

Defense

Pos.	#	Name	Class
LB		Arthur Akers
DB		Brian Baggott
S	5	Kenny Easley	Jr
LB		Chris Elias
DL		Mark Ferguson
DE		Joe Gary	So
DB		Dave Gomer
LB		Larry Hall
DB		Phil Hubbard
LB		Billy Don Jackson
DL		Karl Morgan
DL		Martin Moss
LB		Brad Plemmons
LB		Avon Riley
DB		Lupe Sanchez
LB		Scott Stauch
DB		Tom Sullivan
DL		Mark Tuinei

Special teams

Pos.	#	Name	Class
K		Peter Boermeester
K	8	Norm Johnson	So

Head coach

- Terry Donahue

Coordinators/assistant coaches

Legend

- (C) Team captain
- (S) Suspended
- (I) Ineligible
- Injured
- Redshirt

== Awards and honors ==
- All-American: Kenny Easley (S, consensus), Freeman McNeil (TB, third team)
