= 1979 Washington State Cougars football team =

American college football season

1979 Washington State Cougars football
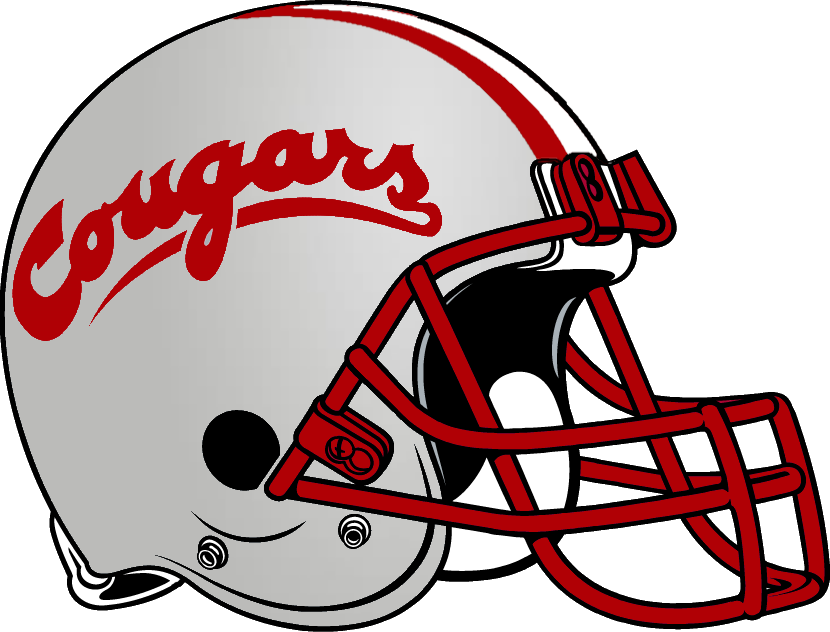
- Conference: Pacific-10 Conference
- Record: 5–6 (4–4 Pac-10)
- Head coach: Jim Walden (2nd season)
- Home stadium: Martin Stadium, Joe Albi Stadium

1979 Pacific-10 Conference football standings
	Conf.					Overall
Team	W		L		T	W		L		T
No. 2 USC $	6	–	0	–	1	11	–	0	–	1
No. 11 Washington	5	–	2	–	0	9	–	3	–	0
Arizona	4	–	3	–	0	6	–	5	–	1
Oregon	4	–	3	–	0	6	–	5	–	0
California	5	–	4	–	0	6	–	6	–	0
Stanford	3	–	3	–	1	5	–	5	–	1
Arizona State *	3	–	4	–	0	6	–	6	–	0
UCLA	3	–	4	–	0	5	–	6	–	0
Washington State	2	–	6	–	0	3	–	8	–	0
Oregon State	1	–	7	–	0	1	–	10	–	0
$ – Conference champion; * – Arizona State later forfeited 5 wins (3 in conference) due to NCAA sanctions; Rankings from AP Poll

The 1979 Washington State Cougars football team was an American football team that represented Washington State University in the Pacific-10 Conference (Pac-10) during the 1979 NCAA Division I-A football season. In their second season under head coach Jim Walden, the Cougars compiled a 5–6 record (4–4 in Pac-10, ninth), and were outscored 366 to 241.

The team's statistical leaders included Steve Grant with 1,565 passing yards, Tali Ena with 844 rushing yards, and Jim Whatley with 513 receiving yards.

Martin Stadium's seating capacity was increased over the summer (track removed, field lowered) and hosted its first game of the season in mid-October for homecoming. The 17–14 upset of UCLA was the Cougars' first win over the Bruins since 1958.

The traditional Battle of the Palouse game with neighbor Idaho went on hiatus beginning with this season (the Vandals had moved down to Division I-AA in 1978); it was played in 1982 and 1989. When Idaho rejoined Division I-A, there was a ten-year resumption (1998–2007).

== Schedule ==
Date	Opponent	Site	Result	Attendance	Source
September 8	Arizona	Joe Albi Stadium; Spokane, WA	L 7–22	26,753	
September 15	Montana*	Joe Albi Stadium; Spokane, WA	W 34–14	20,157	
September 22	at No. 16 Ohio State*	Ohio Stadium; Columbus, OH	L 29–45	87,495	
September 29	at Syracuse*	Rich Stadium; Orchard Park, NY	L 25–52	10,004	
October 6	at No. 1 USC	Los Angeles Memorial Coliseum; Los Angeles, CA	L 21–50	55,117	
October 13	UCLA^{†}	Martin Stadium; Pullman, WA	W 17–14	32,651	
October 20	at Arizona State	Sun Devil Stadium; Tempe, AZ	W 17–28 (forfeit win)	70,729	
October 27	Oregon	Martin Stadium; Pullman, WA	W 26–37 (forfeit win)	18,650	
November 3	at Oregon State	Parker Stadium; Corvallis, OR	W 45–42	21,500	
November 10	California	Martin Stadium; Pullman, WA	L 13–45	22,055	
November 17	at No. 16 Washington	Husky Stadium; Seattle, WA (Apple Cup)	L 7–17	57,750	
*Non-conference game; ^{†}Homecoming; Rankings from AP Poll released prior to the game

== Game summaries ==
=== UCLA ===
On homecoming weekend, Mike Snow blocked two field goals and deflected a pass in the end zone as Washington State upset UCLA 17–14 in front of a record home crowd in the newly-expanded Martin Stadium. Brian Sickler capped an 84-yard fourth quarter drive with a one-yard plunge as the Cougars rallied from a 7–14 halftime deficit.

Senior safety Don McCall recorded two interceptions, seven tackles, and a fumble recovery.

== Roster ==
1979 Washington State Cougars football team roster
Players
Coaches
Offense

Pos.	#	Name	Class
TE	89	Pat Beach	So
RB	39	Tali Ena	Sr
QB	18	Steve Grant	Sr
RB	43	Tim Harris	Fr
OT	75	Steve Johnson	Jr
OT	72	Allan Kennedy	Jr
SE	49	Bevan Maxey	Sr
G	63	Gary Patrick	Fr
C	52	Scott Rogers	Sr
QB	11	Samoa Samoa	Jr
FB	10	Brian Sickler	Jr
G	58	Greg Sykes	Jr
RB	31	Ray Williams	Sr
SE	86	Mike Wilson	Jr
FL	21	Jim Whatley	Jr

Defense

Pos.	#	Name	Class
DT	95	Ken Collins	So
DT	73	Matt Elisara	So
CB	41	Jeff Files	So
MG	61	Brian Flones	Jr
FS	28	Bob Gregor	Sr
FS	4	Don McCall	Sr
LB	39	Don Nevels	Sr
CB	27	Hugh Parker	Jr
LB	47	Scott Pelluer	Jr
DT	91	Dave Schneider	Jr
CB	13	Mike Snow	Sr
LB	36	Tom Thompson	Sr
DE	62	Mike Walker	Jr
SS	44	John West	So

Special teams

Pos.	#	Name	Class
P	16	Tim Davey	So
K	1	Mike DeSanto	Jr

Head coach

- Jim Walden (2nd year)

Coordinators/assistant coaches

- Dave Elliott
- Gary Gagnon
- Rich Glover
- Lindsay Hughes
- Steve Morton
- Scott Ricardo
- Pat Ruel
- Dave Walker
- Harold Wheeler
- Ken Woody

Legend

- (C) Team captain
- (S) Suspended
- (I) Ineligible
- Injured
- Redshirt

=== Fallen teammate ===
During an evening practice on August 22, senior defensive tackle Hayward "Spud" Harris of Tacoma collapsed during a non-contact drill. He could not be revived by the training staff, was rushed by ambulance to Pullman Memorial Hospital, and was pronounced dead an hour after arrival.

== NFL draft ==
Four Cougars were selected in the 1980 NFL draft.

Player	Position	Round	Overall	Franchise
Bob Gregor	S	4	108	San Diego Chargers
Tali Ena	RB	11	292	Seattle Seahawks
Ray Williams	WR/RB	12	307	Detroit Lions
Tyrone Gray	DB	12	309	St. Louis Cardinals
