= Craig Fertig =

American football player and coach (1942–2008)

Biographical details
- Born: May 7, 1942; Bell, California, U.S.
- Died: October 4, 2008 (aged 66); Newport Beach, California, U.S.

Playing career
- 1961–1964: USC
- Position: Quarterback

Coaching career (HC unless noted)
- 1965–1973: USC (assistant)
- 1974: Portland Storm (assistant)
- 1975: USC (assistant)
- 1976–1979: Oregon State

Head coaching record
- Overall: 10–34–1

Accomplishments and honors

Awards
- Second-team All-PCC (1964)

Craig Fertig (May 7, 1942 – October 4, 2008) was an American college football player and coach. He was the head football coach at Oregon State University from 1976 to 1979, compiling a record of 10–34–1 (.233) in four seasons.

== Playing career ==
Fertig attended the University of Southern California where he was a star quarterback for the Trojans. In 1964, he set eight school passing records and threw the game-winning touchdown against top-ranked Notre Dame.

== Coaching career ==
Selected late in the 1965 NFL draft, 270th overall in the 20th round, Fertig opted not to play professional football and began coaching in 1965 at USC. From 1965 to 1975, he served as an assistant coach with the Trojans, except for a year in the World Football League (WFL) in 1974. Fertig was hired as an assistant coach with the Portland Storm, but the team only lasted one season. The IRS impounded the franchise at the conclusion of the 1974 season and Fertig returned to USC as an assistant in 1975.

At age 33 in December 1975, Fertig was named the head coach at Oregon State University in Corvallis, with a three-year contract at $26,000 per year. He followed Dee Andros, who stepped down after eleven seasons and became OSU's athletic director. Fertig was fired during his fourth season in October 1979, in the second year of a three-year contract at $33,696 per year. He coached through the end of the season, and lost the finale to Oregon 24–3 in the Civil War, the Beavers' fifth straight loss to the Ducks.

Fertig served as an assistant athletic director for the Trojans, and was later a broadcaster. In 2003, Fertig was hired as head coach of Estancia High School's varsity football team. As a walk-on coach, Fertig guided the Eagles for two seasons, going 3-7 in 2003 and 4-6 in 2004.

== Family and death ==
Born in Bell, California, Fertig was from Huntington Park, where his father was chief of police. He graduated from Huntington Park High School and enrolled at USC. Fertig's sister Trudy also attended USC and married former USC lineman Marv Marinovich; their son Todd Marinovich is Fertig's nephew.

Fertig died in 2008 at age 66 of kidney failure at Hoag Memorial Hospital Presbyterian in Newport Beach on October 4. USC remembered him with a moment of silence at the game against Oregon that evening.

== Head coaching record ==
Year	Team	Overall	Conference	Standing	Bowl/playoffs
Oregon State Beavers (Pacific-8 / Pacific-10 Conference) (1976–1979)
1976	Oregon State	2–10	1–6	T–7th	
1977	Oregon State	3–8	1–7	T–7th	
1978	Oregon State	3–7–1	2–6	9th	
1979	Oregon State	2–9	1–7	10th	
Oregon State:		10–34–1	5–26		
Total:		10–34–1			
