= 1979 Arizona State Sun Devils football team =

American college football season

1979 Arizona State Sun Devils football
- Conference: Pacific-10 Conference
- Record: 1–6, 5 wins forfeited (0–4 Pac-10, 3 wins forfeited)
- Head coach: Frank Kush (22nd season; first 5 games); Bob Owens (interim final 7 games)
- Home stadium: Sun Devil Stadium

1979 Pacific-10 Conference football standings
	Conf.					Overall
Team	W		L		T	W		L		T
No. 2 USC $	6	–	0	–	1	11	–	0	–	1
No. 11 Washington	5	–	2	–	0	9	–	3	–	0
Arizona	4	–	3	–	0	6	–	5	–	1
Oregon	4	–	3	–	0	6	–	5	–	0
California	5	–	4	–	0	6	–	6	–	0
Stanford	3	–	3	–	1	5	–	5	–	1
Arizona State *	3	–	4	–	0	6	–	6	–	0
UCLA	3	–	4	–	0	5	–	6	–	0
Washington State	2	–	6	–	0	3	–	8	–	0
Oregon State	1	–	7	–	0	1	–	10	–	0
$ – Conference champion; * – Arizona State later forfeited 5 wins (3 in conference) due to NCAA sanctions; Rankings from AP Poll

The 1979 Arizona State Sun Devils football team represented Arizona State University as a member of the Pacific-10 Conference (Pac-10) during the 1979 NCAA Division I-A football season. The team was led by head coach Frank Kush through the first five games and by Bob Owens for the final seven games. They finished with a record of six wins and six losses (6–6, 3–4 Pac-10). The offense scored 306 points while the defense allowed 208 points. The team later forfeited five victories.

== Schedule ==
Date	Time	Opponent	Rank	Site	TV	Result	Attendance	Source
September 8	7:00 pm	California	No. 18	Sun Devil Stadium; Tempe, AZ		L 9–17	71,005	
September 15	3:30 pm	vs. No. 18 Florida State*		Tampa Stadium; Tampa, FL		L 3–31	33,484	
September 22	7:00 pm	Toledo*		Sun Devil Stadium; Tempe, Arizona		W 49–0	68,756	
September 29	6:00 pm	at Oregon State		Parker Stadium; Corvallis, OR		F 45–0 (forfeit)	20,000	
October 13	7:00 pm	No. 6 Washington		Sun Devil Stadium; Tempe, AZ		F 12–7 (forfeit)	70,512	
October 20	7:00 pm	Washington State		Sun Devil Stadium; Tempe, AZ		F 28–17 (forfeit)	70,729	
October 27	2:00 pm	Utah State*		Sun Devil Stadium; Tempe, AZ	KTVK	F 28–14 (forfeit)	67,219	
November 3	2:00 pm	at Stanford		Stanford Stadium; Stanford, CA	ABC	L 21–28	30,885	
November 10	2:30 pm	at UCLA		Los Angeles Memorial Coliseum; Los Angeles, CA		L 28–31	34,763	
November 17	7:00 pm	West Virginia*		Sun Devil Stadium; Tempe, AZ		W 42–7	68,573	
November 24	7:00 pm	Arizona		Sun Devil Stadium; Tempe, AZ		L 24–27	70,947	
December 1	8:00 pm	at Hawaii*		Aloha Stadium; Halawa, HI		L 17–29	42,040	
*Non-conference game; Rankings from AP Poll released prior to the game; All times are in Mountain time

== Game summaries ==
=== Washington ===
Frank Kush, who was coaching in his final collegiate game, was carried onto the field before the game and then off of the field following Arizona State's upset.

== Personnel ==
1979 Arizona State Sun Devils football team roster
Players
Coaches
Offense

Pos.	#	Name	Class
TE	84	Jerry Bell	So
QB	19	Steve Bratkowski	So
WR	80	Bernard Henry	So
WR	86	Melvin Hoover	Jr
QB	16	Mark Malone	Sr
WR	88	John Mistler	Jr
QB	10	Mike Pagel	So
RB	37	Gerald Riggs	So
WR	83	Ron Washington	Jr
RB	24	Robert Weathers	So

Defense

Pos.	#	Name	Class
LB	91	Ben Apuna	Sr
DE	95	Bob Kohrs (C)	Sr
LB	55	Joey Lumpkin	So
LB	59	Gary Padjen	Sr

Special teams

Pos.	#	Name	Class

Head coach

- Frank Kush

Coordinators/assistant coaches

- Bob Owens
- Al Luginbill – Linebackers

Legend

- (C) Team captain
- (S) Suspended
- (I) Ineligible
- Injured
- Redshirt

== 1979 team players in the NFL ==
The following players were claimed in the 1980 NFL draft.

Player	Position	Round	Pick	NFL club
Mark Malone	Quarterback	1	28	Pittsburgh Steelers
Bob Kohrs	Linebacker	2	35	Pittsburgh Steelers
Ben Apuna	Linebacker	7	171	St. Louis Cardinals
Joel Peters	Defensive tackle	9	234	New York Jets
Gary Padjen	Linebacker	11	300	Dallas Cowboys
