= Tony Mason (American football) =

American football coach (1928–1994)

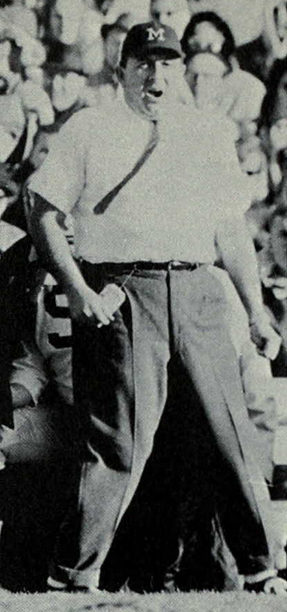
- Mason from the 1965 Michiganensian

Biographical details
- Born: March 2, 1928; Farrell, Pennsylvania, U.S.
- Died: July 23, 1994 (aged 66); Cleveland, Ohio, U.S.
- Education: Clarion (PA)

Coaching career (HC unless noted)
- 1958–1963: Niles McKinley HS (OH)
- 1964–1968: Michigan (assistant)
- 1969–1972: Purdue (DL)
- 1973–1976: Cincinnati
- 1977–1979: Arizona

Head coaching record
- Overall: 41–37–1 (college)
- Bowls: 0–1

Anthony J. Mason (March 2, 1928 – July 23, 1994) was an American football coach. He was the head coach at the University of Cincinnati from 1973 to 1976 and at the University of Arizona in Tucson from 1977 through 1979, compiling a career college football record of 41–37–1 (.525).

Prior to Cincinnati, Mason was an assistant coach for nine seasons in the Big Ten Conference, five at Michigan under Bump Elliott and four at Purdue. Earlier, he was the head coach at Niles McKinley High School in Niles, Ohio, where the Red Dragons won state championships in 1961 and 1963. Mason was elected to the Ohio High School Athletic Association Hall of Fame in 2002; he died in 1994 at age 66, after collapsing at Cleveland Hopkins International Airport.

== Head coaching record ==
=== College ===
| Year | Team | Overall | Conference | Standing | Bowl/playoffs |
|---|---|---|---|---|---|
Cincinnati Bearcats (NCAA Division I independent) (1973–1976)
| 1973 | Cincinnati | 4–7 | | | |
| 1974 | Cincinnati | 7–4 | | | |
| 1975 | Cincinnati | 6–5 | | | |
| 1976 | Cincinnati | 8–3 | | | |
| Cincinnati: | | 25–19 | | | |
Arizona Wildcats (Western Athletic Conference) (1977)
| 1977 | Arizona | 5–7 | 3–4 | 5th | |
Arizona Wildcats (Pacific-10 Conference) (1978–1979)
| 1978 | Arizona | 5–6 | 3–4 | T–6th | |
| 1979 | Arizona | 6–5–1 | 4–3 | T–3rd | L Fiesta |
| Arizona: | | 16–18–1 | 10–11 | | |
| Total: | | 41–37–1 | | | |
