= Tom Flick =

American football player (born 1958)

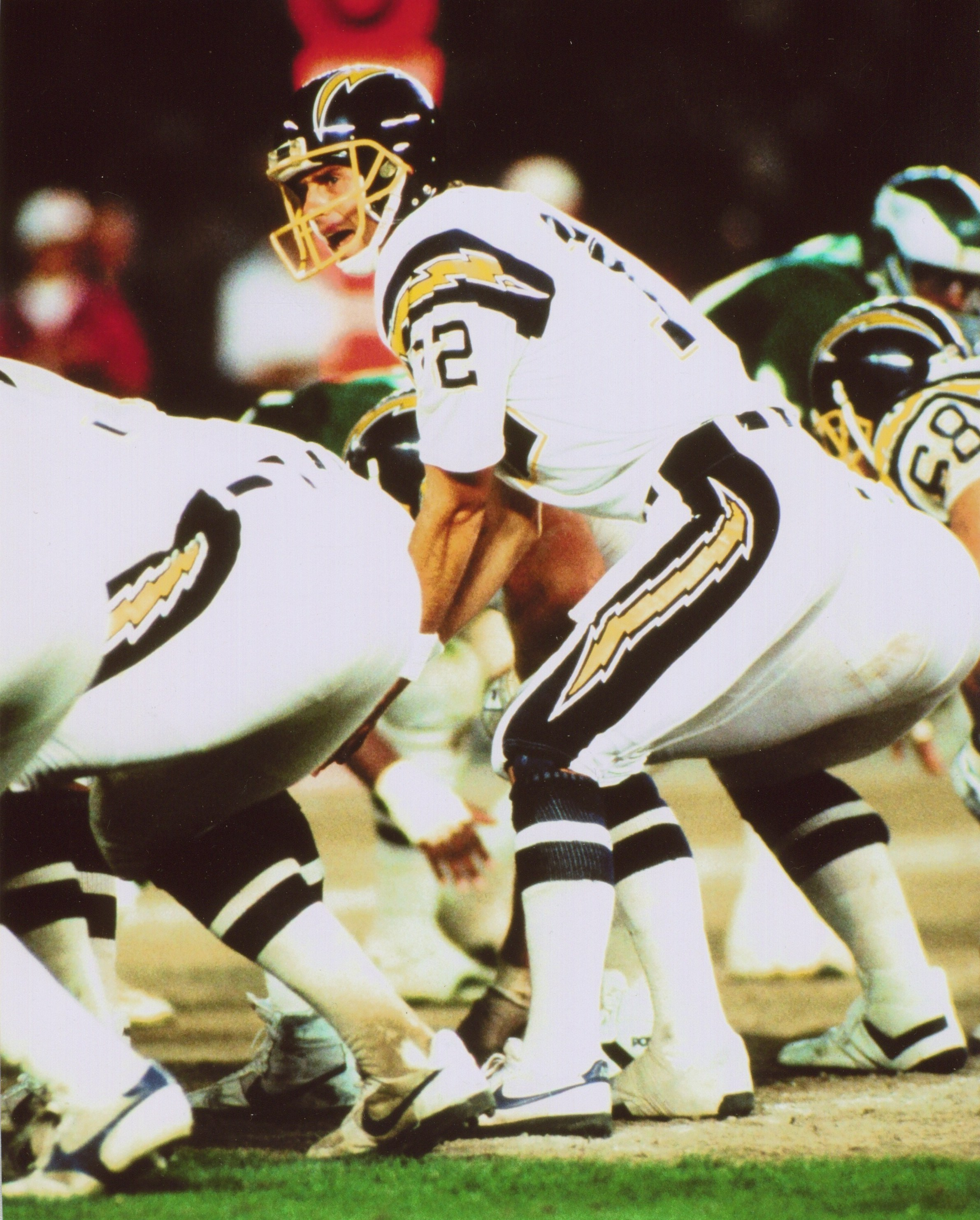
- Flick behind center in 1986

No. 12, 10
- Position: Quarterback

Personal information
- Born: August 30, 1958 (age 68); NAS Patuxent River, Maryland, U.S.
- Listed height: 6 ft 2 in (1.88 m)
- Listed weight: 190 lb (86 kg)

Career information
- High school: Interlake (Bellevue, Washington)
- College: Washington
- NFL draft: 1981: 4th round, 90th overall pick

Career history
- Washington Redskins (1981); New England Patriots (1982–1983); Cleveland Browns (1984–1985); San Diego Chargers (1986); New York Jets (1987)

Awards and highlights
- Second-team All-Pac-10 (1980)

Career NFL statistics
- Passing attempts: 106
- Passing completions: 47
- Completion percentage: 44.3%
- TD–INT: 2–10
- Passing yards: 506
- Passer rating: 25.9
- Stats at Pro Football Reference

Thomas Lyle Flick (born August 30, 1958) is an American former professional football player who was a quarterback for seven seasons in the National Football League (NFL) with five teams. He played college football for the Washington Huskies, and is currently a corporate speaker on leadership and change.

== Football ==
=== High school ===
Born in Maryland and raised in Bellevue, Washington, Flick attended Interlake High School and played football, basketball, and baseball. As the starting quarterback in his junior season (fall 1974), he led the Saints to 10–0 season, the Kingco championship, and a #2 ranking in the state. Leading Interlake to a repeat appearance in the Kingco championship in his senior season, Flick was recruited by many top colleges, ultimately accepting a scholarship to the University of Washington in nearby Seattle to play under second-year head coach Don James in the Pac-10 Conference.

=== College ===
Flick redshirted during his sophomore season in 1977, when the #13 Huskies, led by senior quarterback Warren Moon, upset fourth-ranked Michigan in the Rose Bowl.

Flick became the starting quarterback in October 1979, and led the Huskies to bowl games in his final two seasons: the Sun in December 1979 and Rose in January 1981. While leading UW to a 9–2 record and the Pac-10 championship in 1980, he set several records, including most passing yards in a single season (2,460) and longest touchdown pass (84 yards to Willie Rosborough against Air Force). Known for his accuracy, Flick set a record in 1980 for career passing percentage (60.4%), including a game against Arizona where he set a record for the highest single-game passing percentage, completing 16 of 17 passes (94.1%) and three touchdowns, while suffering from a concussion.

During his senior season in 1980, Flick was voted team captain and most inspirational by his teammates. He was chosen to play in two all-star games in January 1981: the East-West Shrine Game, and Japan Bowl, as the starting quarterback.

=== NFL ===
Flick was selected in the fourth round (90th overall) of the 1981 NFL draft by the Washington Redskins. As the third quarterback taken, he was hand-picked by first-year head coach Joe Gibbs. Traded after his rookie year to the New England Patriots, Flick continued his seven-year NFL career with the Cleveland Browns, San Diego Chargers, and New York Jets. Most of his playing time was with San Diego as the backup quarterback to hall of famer Dan Fouts, earning MVP game honors by completing 16 of 22 passes against the Super Bowl-bound Denver Broncos in 1986.

== Speaking career ==
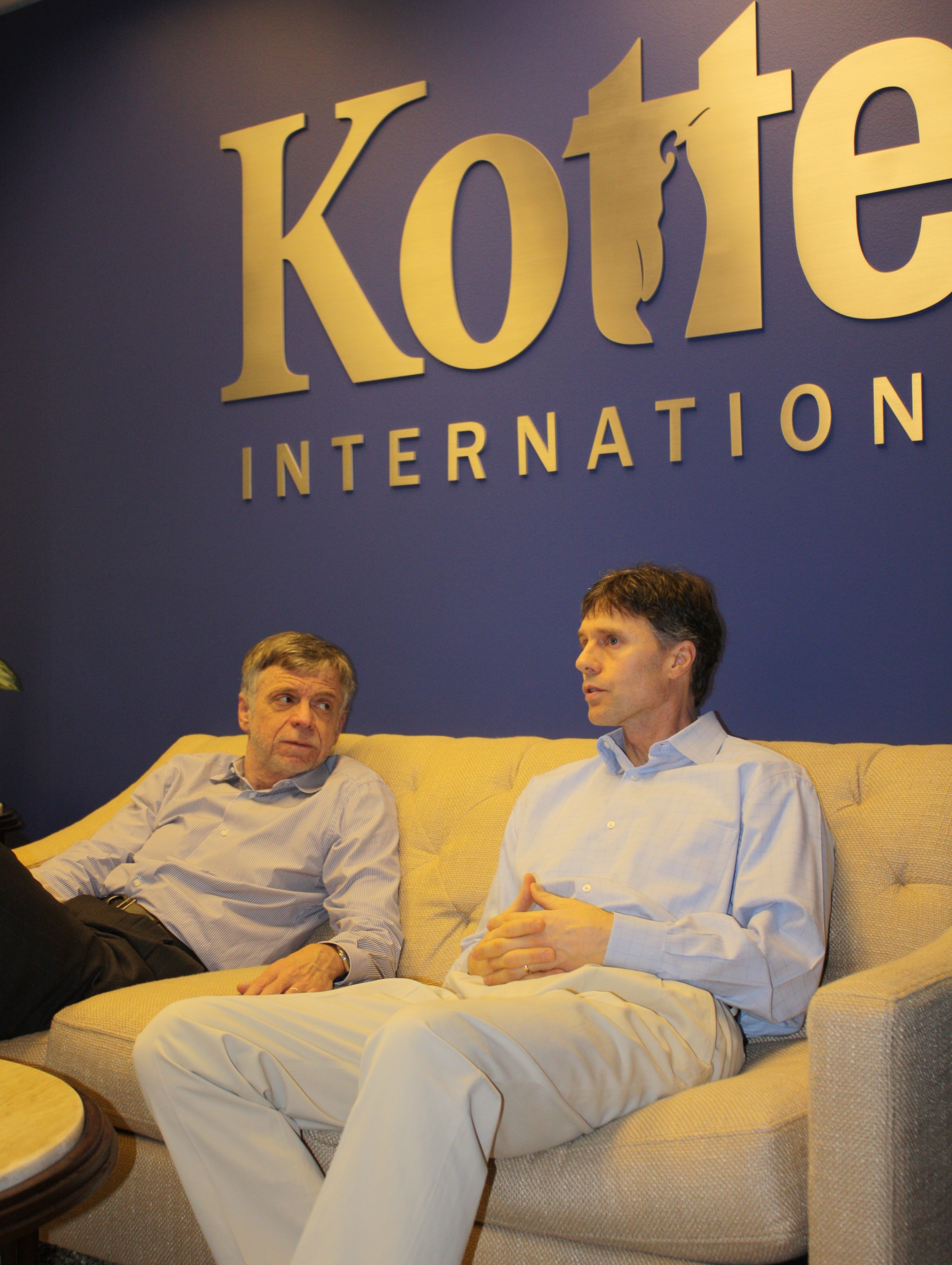
Tom Flick (right) speaks with John Kotter in 2011

Known for his leadership skills during his career as a quarterback, Flick transitioned into the realm of inspirational speaking. Founding Tom Flick Communications in 1989, he started off by speaking to educational systems. An expert on leadership and change, Flick has traveled throughout North America and internationally to deliver thousands of keynotes and custom presentations to countless organizations. Clients include Microsoft, Starbucks, Hallmark, Boeing, American Express, NASA, Ritz Carlton Hotels, and the Pentagon.

Mentored by leadership and change expert Dennis Goin, Executive Vice President of Kotter International, Flick has an alliance with Kotter International, founded by Konosuke Matsushita Professor of Leadership, Emeritus at the Harvard Business School and Chief Innovation Officer, Dr. John Kotter.

== Personal life ==
Married since 1985, Flick and his wife, Molly, have two children, Jenny and Joe. He currently resides in Redmond, Washington.
