= 1979 Fiesta Bowl =

American college football game

- 9th Fiesta Bowl
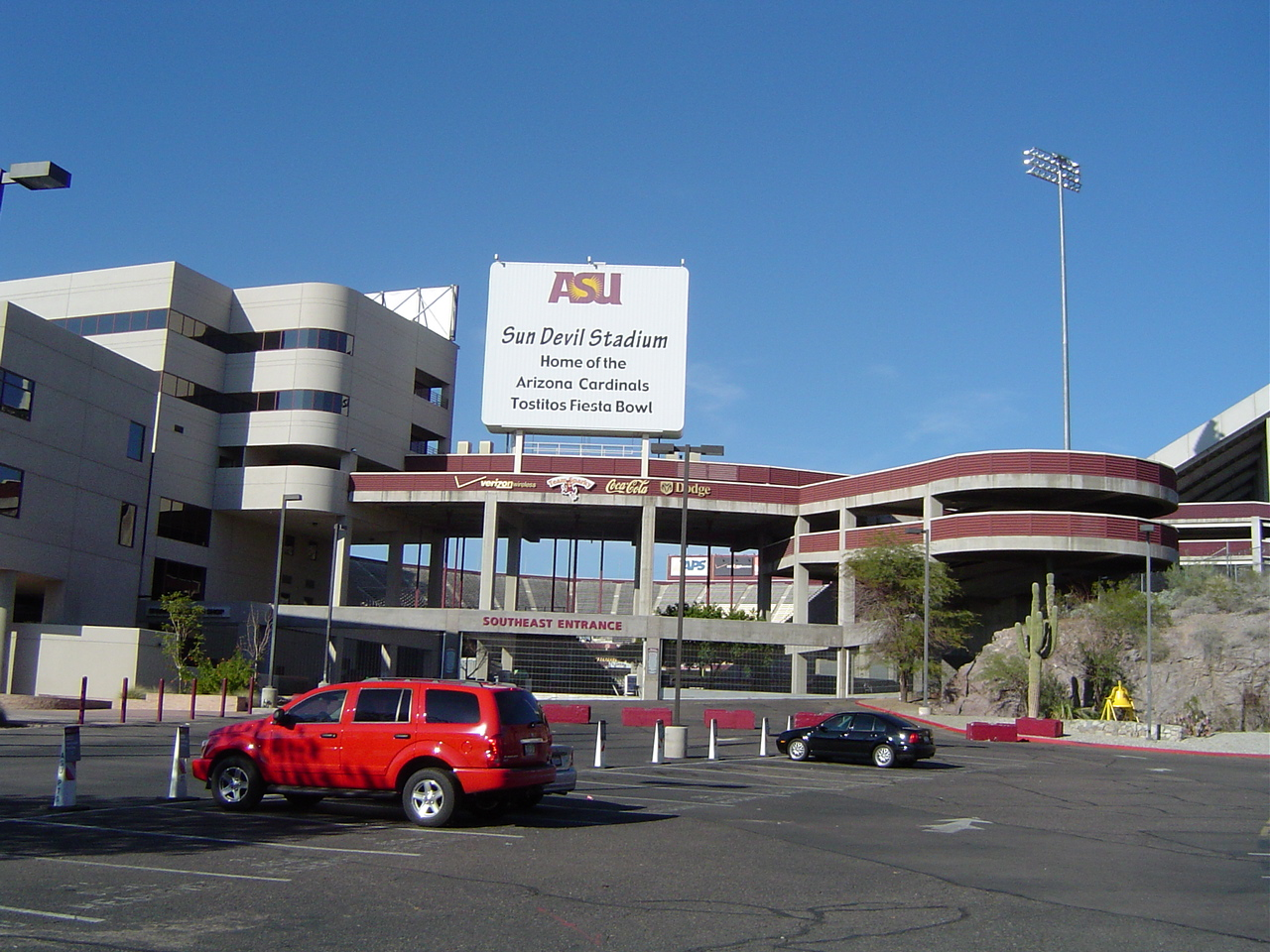
- Sun Devil Stadium in Tempe, Arizona, hosted the Fiesta Bowl.
Pittsburgh Panthers	Arizona Wildcats
(10–1)	(6–4–1)
Independent	Pac-10
16	10
Head coach: Jackie Sherrill	Head coach: Tony Mason
AP / Coaches; 10 / 10
	1	2	3	4	Total
Pittsburgh	3	3	7	3	16
Arizona	0	0	3	7	10
- Date: December 25, 1979
- Season: 1979
- Stadium: Sun Devil Stadium
- Location: Tempe, Arizona
- MVP: Mark Schubert (Pittsburgh K); Dave Liggins (Arizona SS)
- Favorite: Pittsburgh by 8 to 9 points
- Referee: Percy Penn (SWC)
- Attendance: 55,347

United States TV coverage
- Network: NBC
- Announcers: Charlie Jones, Len Dawson

The 1979 Fiesta Bowl was the ninth edition of the college football bowl game, played at Sun Devil Stadium in Tempe, Arizona on Tuesday, December 25. Part of the 1979–80 bowl game season, it matched the tenth-ranked independent Pittsburgh Panthers and the unranked Arizona Wildcats of the Pacific-10 Conference (Pac-10). Favored Pittsburgh never trailed and won 16–10.

This was the last of four consecutive Fiesta Bowls played on Christmas Day.

== Teams ==
=== Pittsburgh ===
This was Pittsburgh's second Fiesta Bowl appearance; the first was six years earlier.

=== Arizona ===
Despite finishing third in the Pac-10 with an overall record of 6–4–1, Arizona was invited; it was their first bowl appearance in eleven years.

== Game summary ==
Televised by NBC, the game kicked off on Christmas Day shortly after 1:30 p.m. MST.

Pittsburgh kicker Mark Schubert gave his team a lead they never relinquished with two field goals for a 6–0 lead at halftime. Arizona responded with a Brett Weber field goal, but Panther tight end Benjie Pryor caught a touchdown pass from true freshman quarterback Dan Marino to increase the lead to 13–3 at the end of three quarters.

Schubert added a third field goal, but Arizona halfback Hubert Oliver scored from a yard out to close the margin to six points at 16–10. After Pittsburgh punted the ball back, the Wildcats looked to drive for the winning points with 1:05 left. But just seven seconds later, quarterback Jim Krohn's pass was intercepted by Terry White and the Panthers won their first Fiesta Bowl.

Schubert was the first kicker named offensive MVP.

=== Scoring ===
First quarter

- Pittsburgh – Mark Schubert 46-yard field goal

Second quarter

- Pittsburgh – Schubert 36-yard field goal

Third quarter

- Arizona – Brett Weber 38-yard field goal
- Pittsburgh – Benjie Pryor 12-yard pass from Dan Marino (Schubert kick)

Fourth quarter

- Pittsburgh – Schubert 46-yard field goal
- Arizona – Hubert Oliver 1-yard run (Bill Zivic kick)

== Statistics ==
Statistics	Pittsburgh	Arizona
First downs	20	20
Yards rushing	44–127	38–91
Yards passing	172	226
Passing	15–29–2	18–35–3
Return yards	37	46
Total Offense	73–299	73–317
Punts–Average	5–34.2	4–39.8
Fumbles–Lost	1–0	2–1
Turnovers	2	4
Penalties–Yards	10–89	7–85

== Aftermath ==
Pittsburgh returned to the Fiesta Bowl four years later, but as of 2020 have yet to win another. Arizona finally won a bowl game in 1986, and returned to the Fiesta Bowl in 1994.
