= Bob Owens (American football, born 1935) =

American football player and coach (c. 1935–2013)

Biographical details
- Born: c. 1935
- Died: November 4, 2013 (aged 77); Tempe, Arizona, U.S.

Playing career
- 1958: Fresno State
- Position: Halfback

Coaching career (HC unless noted)
- 1967–?: Arizona State (assistant)
- 1978–1979: Arizona State (DC)
- 1979: Arizona State (interim HC)
- 1980–?: UNLV (assistant)
- 1991–2011: Pasadena City (assistant)

Head coaching record
- Overall: 3–4

Bob Owens (born c. 1935 – November 4, 2013) was an American college football player and coach. He served as the interim head football coach at Arizona State University for the final seven games of the 1979 season after the firing of Frank Kush, compiling a record of 3–4.

== Head coaching record ==
| Year | Team | Overall | Conference | Standing | Bowl/playoffs |
|---|---|---|---|---|---|
Arizona State Sun Devils (Pacific-10 Conference) (1979)
| 1979 | Arizona State | 3–4 (Note: The first five games of the season were coached by Frank Kush. Arizona state later forfeited two of their wins, including a conference victory over Washington State, in 1979 under Owens.) | 1–3 | T–6th | |
| Arizona State: | | 3–4 | 1–3 | | |
| Total: | | 3–4 | | | |
