= 1979 Garden State Bowl =

American college football game

Temple Owls	California Golden Bears
(9–2)	(7–4)
28	17
Head coach: Wayne Hardin	Head coach: Roger Theder
AP / Coaches; 20 / 18
	1	2	3	4	Total
Temple	21	0	0	7	28
California	0	14	0	3	17
- Date: December 15, 1979
- Season: 1979
- Stadium: Giants Stadium
- Location: East Rutherford, New Jersey
- MVP: Mark Bright
- Attendance: 40,207
- Payout: US$225,000 (each)

The 1979 Garden State Bowl, played on December 15, 1979, was the second edition of the Garden State Bowl. The game featured the California Golden Bears, who played in their first bowl since the 1959 Rose Bowl, and the Temple Owls, who made their first bowl appearance since the 1935 Sugar Bowl. 55,493 tickets were sold but only 40,207 fans showed on a cold 29°-day in the Meadowlands to see the Owls beat the Golden Bears, 28–17. The game was nationally televised on the Mizlou Television Network.

== Game summary ==
The Owls scored on their first three possessions and jumped ahead to a 21–0 lead in the first quarter on drives of 67 and 50 yards with scoring runs of 8 and 4 yards by running back Kevin Duckett and a seven-yard touchdown pass from quarterback Brian Broomell to receiver Wiley Pitts. The Golden Bears trimmed the lead to 21–14 at the half, after touchdown passes from Cal quarterback Rich Campbell to Matt Bouza and Joe Rose. After a Cal field goal by Mick Luckhurst early in the fourth quarter, the Bears closed to within four points, only to have Temple seal the game with a 78-yard drive ending with a five-yard touchdown pass from Broomell to Gerald (Sweet Feet) Lucear. The Owls rushed for 300 of their 381 yards total offense. Mark Bright, Temple's fullback, was named Most Valuable Player for gaining 112 yards on 19 carries. Campbell was the leading passer in the game with 241 yards, but Cal had just 23 yards rushing. The Temple defense was led by sophomore tackle Guy Peters, who recorded three sacks and recovered a fumble.

The Bowl win was Temple's 10th win of the year, a team record, and earned Wayne Hardin's team a spot in the AP and UPI Top 20. Temple was ranked 17th in both polls, the first time the Temple football team was nationally ranked in the final wire service polls. Cal wound up 6–6 and took its worst setback after suffering its five regular season defeats by a total of 24 points.
