= 1979 Washington Huskies football team =

American college football season

1979 Washington Huskies football

Sun Bowl, W 14–7 vs. Texas
- Conference: Pacific-10 Conference

Ranking
- Coaches: No. 11
- AP: No. 11
- Record: 10–2 (6–1 Pac-10)
- Head coach: Don James (5th season)
- Offensive coordinator: Bob Stull (1st season)
- Defensive coordinator: Jim Lambright (2nd season)
- MVP: Mark Lee
- Captains: Phil Foreman; Doug Martin; Richardson; Joe Steele
- Home stadium: Husky Stadium

1979 Pacific-10 Conference football standings
	Conf.					Overall
Team	W		L		T	W		L		T
No. 2 USC $	6	–	0	–	1	11	–	0	–	1
No. 11 Washington	5	–	2	–	0	9	–	3	–	0
Arizona	4	–	3	–	0	6	–	5	–	1
Oregon	4	–	3	–	0	6	–	5	–	0
California	5	–	4	–	0	6	–	6	–	0
Stanford	3	–	3	–	1	5	–	5	–	1
Arizona State *	3	–	4	–	0	6	–	6	–	0
UCLA	3	–	4	–	0	5	–	6	–	0
Washington State	2	–	6	–	0	3	–	8	–	0
Oregon State	1	–	7	–	0	1	–	10	–	0
$ – Conference champion; * – Arizona State later forfeited 5 wins (3 in conference) due to NCAA sanctions; Rankings from AP Poll

The 1979 Washington Huskies football team was an American football team that represented the University of Washington during the 1979 NCAA Division I-A football season. In its fifth season under head coach Don James, the team compiled a 10–2 record, finished in second place in the Pacific-10 Conference, and outscored its opponents 321 to 154.

The two conference losses were to Arizona State and USC; Arizona State later forfeited its wins due to ineligible players. The conference opponents not played this season were Arizona and Stanford. Washington won the Apple Cup over Washington State for a sixth consecutive year, and the Sun Bowl over favored Texas.

Defensive back Mark Lee was selected as the team's most valuable player. Phil Foreman, Doug Martin, Antowaine Richardson, and Joe Steele were the team captains.

== Schedule ==
Date	Opponent	Rank	Site	TV	Result	Attendance	Source
September 8	Wyoming*	No. 15	Husky Stadium; Seattle, WA		W 38–2	41,927	
September 15	Utah*	No. 14	Husky Stadium; Seattle, WA		W 41–7	49,735	
September 22	at Oregon	No. 12	Autzen Stadium; Eugene, OR (rivalry)		W 21–17	42,500	
September 29	Fresno State*	No. 9	Husky Stadium; Seattle, WA		W 49–14	47,376	
October 6	Oregon State	No. 7	Husky Stadium; Seattle, WA		W 41–0	49,881	
October 13	at Arizona State	No. 6	Sun Devil Stadium; Tempe, AZ		W 7–12 (Arizona State forfeit)	70,912	
October 20	No. 17 Pittsburgh*	No. 12	Husky Stadium; Seattle, WA		L 14–26	52,485	
October 27	at UCLA	No. 20	Los Angeles Memorial Coliseum; Los Angeles, CA		W 34–14	35,757	
November 3	at California	No. 16	California Memorial Stadium; Berkeley, CA		W 28–24	25,000	
November 10	No. 4 USC	No. 15	Husky Stadium; Seattle, WA		L 17–24	60,527	
November 17	Washington State	No. 16	Husky Stadium; Seattle, WA (Apple Cup)		W 17–7	56,110	
December 22	vs. No. 11 Texas*	No. 13	Sun Bowl; El Paso, TX (Sun Bowl)	CBS	W 14–7	33,412	
*Non-conference game; Rankings from AP Poll released prior to the game; Source:

== Roster ==
1979 Washington Huskies football team roster
Players
Coaches
Offense

Pos.	#	Name	Class
SE	2	Aaron Williams	Fr
RB	5	Vince Coby	Jr
SE	7	Paul Skansi	Fr
QB	7	Tom Porras	Sr
QB	12	Tom Flick	Jr
SE	17	Ron Blacken	Sr
RB	24	Joe Steele (C)	Sr
RB	45	Toussaint Tyler	Jr
C	56	Tom Turnure	Sr
G	62	Phil Foreman (C)	Sr
G	68	Dan Chavira	Sr
OT	76	Joe Sanford	Sr
OT	78	Curt Marsh	Jr
OT	79	Randy Van Divier	Jr
TE	86	David Bayle	Jr

Defense

Pos.	#	Name	Class
FS	3	Derek Harvey	Fr
CB	8	Ray Horton	So
CB	10	Lance Theoudele	Sr
LB	18	Jim Pence	Sr
CB	19	Mark Lee (C)	Sr
DB	23	Vince Newsome	Fr
LB	38	Mark Stewart	Fr
SS	46	Greg Grimes	Sr
LB	48	Antowaine Richardson (C)	Sr
LB	55	Bruce Harrell	Sr
NG	58	Stafford Mays	Sr
LB	60	Pete Tormey	Sr
DT	61	Chris Linnin	Sr
DT	64	Rusty Olsen	Jr
DT	65	Fletcher Jenkins	So
LB	67	Mark Jerue	So
DE	73	Doug Martin	Sr

Special teams

Pos.	#	Name	Class
K	1	Mike Lansford	Sr
P	14	Rich Camarillo	Jr

Head coach

- Don James (5th year)

Coordinators/assistant coaches

- Bob Stull – (OC)
- Jim Lambright – (DC)

Legend

- (C) Team captain
- (S) Suspended
- (I) Ineligible
- Injured
- Redshirt

== NFL draft selections ==
Eight University of Washington Huskies were selected in the 1980 NFL draft, which lasted 12 rounds with 333 selections.

= Husky Hall of Fame

Player	Position	Round	Overall	Franchise
Doug Martin	Defensive end	1st	9	Minnesota Vikings
Mark Lee	Cornerback	2nd	34	Green Bay Packers
Tom Turnure	Center	3rd	57	Detroit Lions
Joe Steele	Running back	5th	127	Seattle Seahawks
Chris Linnin	Defensive tackle	7th	181	New York Giants
Stafford Mays	Defensive tackle	9th	225	St. Louis Cardinals
Joe Sanford	Tackle	10th	256	New York Giants
Mike Lansford	Kicker	12th	312	New York Giants
