= Roger Theder =

American football player and coach (1939–2016)

Biographical details
- Born: September 22, 1939
- Died: October 1, 2016 (aged 77); Orinda, California, U.S.

Playing career
- 1960–1962: Western Michigan
- Position: Quarterback

Coaching career (HC unless noted)
- 1963: Bowling Green (GA)
- 1964: Shawnee HS (OH)
- 1965–1967: Northern Illinois (assistant)
- 1968–1971: Stanford (assistant)
- 1972–1977: California (assistant)
- 1978–1981: California
- 1982–1984: Baltimore Colts (RB)
- 1985: Arizona Outlaws (OC)
- 1987: San Diego Chargers (QB)
- 1993–1996: San Jose State (OC)

Head coaching record
- Overall: 18–27 (college)
- Bowls: 0–1

Roger Theder (September 22, 1939 – October 1, 2016) was an American football player and coach. He served as the head football coach at the University of California, Berkeley from 1978 to 1981, compiling an on-field record of 17–28. Theder was later an assistant coach for the Baltimore Colts and the San Diego Chargers of the National Football League (NFL). Theder was an alumnus of Western Michigan University, where he played college football as a quarterback and joined Phi Kappa Tau fraternity. Theder died on October 1, 2016, from Parkinson's disease at the age of 77.

== Head coaching record ==
=== College ===
Year	Team	Overall	Conference	Standing	Bowl/playoffs
California Golden Bears (Pacific-10 Conference) (1978–1981)
1978	California	6–5	3–4	T–6th	
1979	California	6–6	5–4	5th	L Garden State
1980	California	3–8	3–5	9th	
1981	California	2–9	2–6	8th	
California:		17–28	13–19		
Total:		18–27			
