= Rich Stachowski =

American football player (born 1961)

No. 78
- Position: Defensive tackle

Personal information
- Born: March 29, 1961 (age 65); Los Angeles, California, U.S.
- Listed height: 6 ft 4 in (1.93 m)
- Listed weight: 245 lb (111 kg)

Career information
- High school: Burbank (CA)
- College: California
- NFL draft: 1983: undrafted

Career history
- Denver Broncos (1983)
- Stats at Pro Football Reference

Rich Stachowski (born March 29, 1961) is an American former professional football player who was a defensive tackle for the Denver Broncos of the National Football League (NFL). He played college football for the California Golden Bears before playing for the Broncos in 1983.
