= Rich Campbell (American football) =

American football player (born 1958)

No. 19
- Position: Quarterback

Personal information
- Born: December 21, 1958 (age 67); Miami, Florida, U.S.
- Listed height: 6 ft 4 in (1.93 m)
- Listed weight: 224 lb (102 kg)

Career information
- High school: Santa Teresa (San Jose, California)
- College: California
- NFL draft: 1981: 1st round, 6th overall pick

Career history
- Green Bay Packers (1981–1984); Los Angeles Raiders (1985)

Career NFL statistics
- TD–INT: 3–9
- Passing yards: 386
- Passer rating: 38.8
- Stats at Pro Football Reference

Richard Delano Campbell (born December 21, 1958) is an American former professional football player who was a quarterback for the Green Bay Packers of the National Football League (NFL) from 1981 to 1984. He played college football for the California Golden Bears. He was selected in the first round of the 1981 NFL draft with the sixth overall pick.

Campbell was a touted recruit out of Santa Teresa High School in San Jose, California, and was Cal’s starting quarterback for his sophomore through senior seasons from 1978 to 1980. He earned the valued Joe Roth Award, the award given to the Cal football player who best exemplifies courage and sportsmanship, as a sophomore in 1978.

== College career ==
At the University of California, Berkeley, Campbell led a very competitive Golden Bears team his junior year in 1979, winning 7 games and losing several very close games: 14–10 against #11 Michigan, 28–27 at UCLA, 24-14 to #3 USC (undefeated and eventual Rose Bowl winner), and 28–24 to #16 Washington. In discussing game film of Michigan's 14–10 win over Cal, coach Bo Schembechler referred to Campbell as "a big, strong, powerful quarterback" who "can pick you to death with his throwing arm" as he almost pulled off the upset. A fumbled kickoff return by Cal gave Michigan the ball at the 9-yard line, setting up a two play touchdown drive. The Bears did win the rivalry Big Game at Stanford 21–14 in November, which included one of his fondest memories from his days as the Golden Bears QB: "Just walking off the field and hearing one side of the stands so silent".

Campbell’s success his junior year led to his being featured on the cover of Street and Smith’s Official Yearbook 1980 College Football Preview. Stats for 1979 show Campbell was 3rd in the country in passing yards, 2nd in completions, 2nd in pass completion percentage, and Cal was 3rd in team passing offense.

He was an All-American during his senior season in 1980, completing an NCAA best 71% of his passes. He set a then-NCAA record with 43 completed passes in 53 attempts in a losing effort against the Florida Gators. However, his year was hampered by a late-season knee injury in the game at USC. During his collegiate career at Cal, he passed for 7,174 yards, a record at the time. He is fourth all-time in both passing yards and completions at Cal, as well as 12th in touchdown passes. Among the greatest quarterbacks ever at Cal, he is in the top five in both yards per attempt at 7.7 and passing efficiency rating (min. 300 attempts) at 132.7.

== Professional career ==
Selected by the Green Bay Packers in the 1st round (6th overall) of the 1981 NFL draft, and the only first round quarterback chosen, Campbell eventually played in only seven games over four NFL seasons. Packers offensive coordinator Bob Schnelker believed Campbell didn't have the arm strength, so he rarely put him in to play. Campbell recalls offensive coordinator Schnelker (a former tight end, not a quarterback) as "a really good X's and O's guy but not a guy that will work with you after practice and encourage and develop you. That was what I needed at that time and I didn’t get it." Campbell led the Packers to a last minute road win over the Chicago Bears near the end of the 1984 season; that Bears team would make it to the NFC Championship game, and the Bears defense would dominate the entire NFL the next year, winning the Super Bowl. Trailing by a point with 1:53 to go, Campbell moved the Packers 71 yards, capping the drive with a 43-yard TD pass to Phillip Epps with 34 seconds to go. The Packers won 20–14, avenging an earlier 9–7 loss to Chicago in September. After that 1984 season, the Packers traded Campbell to the Los Angeles Raiders, but he never played again. He has since become a newspaper columnist at Scripps Treasure Coast Newspapers.

The Packers did not draft another quarterback in the first round until selecting Aaron Rodgers 24th overall in the 2005 draft. (Note: The Packers did trade a first round selection in the 1992 draft to the Atlanta Falcons to acquire Brett Favre.) Like Campbell, Rodgers played college football for the University of California and even broke some of Campbell’s team records.
