= Turk Schonert =

American football player and coach (1957–2019)

No. 14, 15
- Position: Quarterback

Personal information
- Born: January 15, 1957; Torrance, California, U.S.
- Died: January 17, 2019 (aged 62); South Carolina, U.S.
- Listed height: 6 ft 1 in (1.85 m)
- Listed weight: 191 lb (87 kg)

Career information
- High school: Servite (Anaheim, California)
- College: Stanford
- NFL draft: 1980: 9th round, 242nd overall pick

Career history

Playing
- Chicago Bears (1980)*; Cincinnati Bengals (1981–1985); Atlanta Falcons (1986); Cincinnati Bengals (1987–1989); New York Jets (1991)*
- * Offseason or practice squad member only

Coaching
- Tampa Bay Buccaneers (1992–1995) Quarterbacks coach; Buffalo Bills (1998–2000) Quarterbacks coach; Carolina Panthers (2001) Quarterbacks coach; New York Giants (2003) Quarterbacks coach; New Orleans Saints (2005) Quarterbacks coach; Buffalo Bills (2006–2007) Quarterbacks coach; Buffalo Bills (2008) Offensive coordinator; Hartford Colonials (2011) Quarterbacks coach*; Las Vegas Locomotives (2011) Offensive assistant; Sacramento Mountain Lions (2012) Head coach; Montreal Alouettes (2014–2018) Receivers coach

Career NFL statistics
- Passing attempts: 504
- Passing completions: 311
- Completion percentage: 61.7%
- TD–INT: 11–20
- Passing yards: 3,788
- Passer rating: 75.6
- Rushing yards: 288
- Rushing touchdowns: 4
- Stats at Pro Football Reference
- Coaching profile at Pro Football Reference

Turk Leroy Schonert (January 15, 1957 – January 17, 2019) was an American professional football player and assistant coach in the National Football League (NFL). He played as a quarterback in the NFL before becoming a coach.

Schonert played college football for the Stanford Indians (now Cardinal) and was selected in the ninth round in the 1980 NFL draft. After his playing career, he was a long-time quarterbacks coach. He was an offensive coordinator for the NFL's Buffalo Bills in 2008 and was the head coach of the United Football League (UFL)'s Sacramento Mountain Lions in 2012.

== Playing career ==
=== Early life ===
Schonert was a two-time All-American quarterback at Servite High School in Anaheim, California. He also played in the 1968 Little League World Series as a shortstop and third baseman for the Garden Grove, California team that finished in third place.

=== College career ===
As a senior quarterback at Stanford University, Schonert followed Guy Benjamin and Steve Dils, who each won the Sammy Baugh Trophy given to college football's top passer, and was backed up by freshman John Elway. Schonert finished as the school's third consecutive NCAA passing champion and set a team record for completion percentage. The season highlight came when Schonert led Stanford back from a 21–0 halftime deficit to tie top ranked USC, 21–21, ultimately costing the Trojans the national title.

=== Professional career ===
Schonert was selected 242nd overall by the Chicago Bears in the ninth round of the 1980 NFL draft but never played for the franchise. He played nine seasons with the Cincinnati Bengals, including the Super Bowl XVI and Super Bowl XXIII teams, and in between his stints with the Bengals, spent one season with the Atlanta Falcons. Schonert retired in 1989, finishing his career with 11 touchdowns, 20 interceptions and a 7–5 record as a starting quarterback.

== Coaching career ==
=== NFL ===
Schonert began coaching quarterbacks in 1992 with the Tampa Bay Buccaneers under Sam Wyche, his former head coach with the Bengals. His quarterback coach at Stanford, Jim Fassel, later became the head coach of the New York Giants and hired Schonert, who also served with the Buffalo Bills, Carolina Panthers and New Orleans Saints.

Schonert, who returned to the Bills in 2006 and was promoted to offensive coordinator in 2008, had worked with Trent Edwards, a graduate of his alma mater, since Buffalo drafted the Stanford quarterback in 2007. Schonert was fired as the offensive coordinator for the Bills on September 4, 2009, just before the start of the season, and replaced with Alex Van Pelt.

=== UFL ===
Schonert was hired as quarterbacks coach for the UFL's Hartford Colonials by head coach Jerry Glanville in 2011, but he was let go with the rest of the coaching staff when the franchise ceased operation prior to the 2011 season. He was then hired by Jim Fassel as an offensive assistant for the UFL's Las Vegas Locomotives.

Prior to working in the CFL, Schonert had been the head coach for the Sacramento Mountain Lions, whose previous head coach, Dennis Green, was involved in a contract dispute with the team.

=== CFL ===
Schonert's duties as an offensive consultant for the Montreal Alouettes included helping quarterback Troy Smith, who struggled with accuracy and production early in the 2014 season. He was subsequently promoted to receivers coach in August 2014. Schonert continued coaching the Alouettes until his death from a heart attack in January 2019.

== Death ==
Schonert died on January 17, 2019 in his South Carolina home of an apparent heart attack just two days after his 62nd birthday.

== See also ==
- List of NCAA major college football yearly passing leaders
