= Martin Stadium (Washington) =

American football stadium in Pullman, Washington

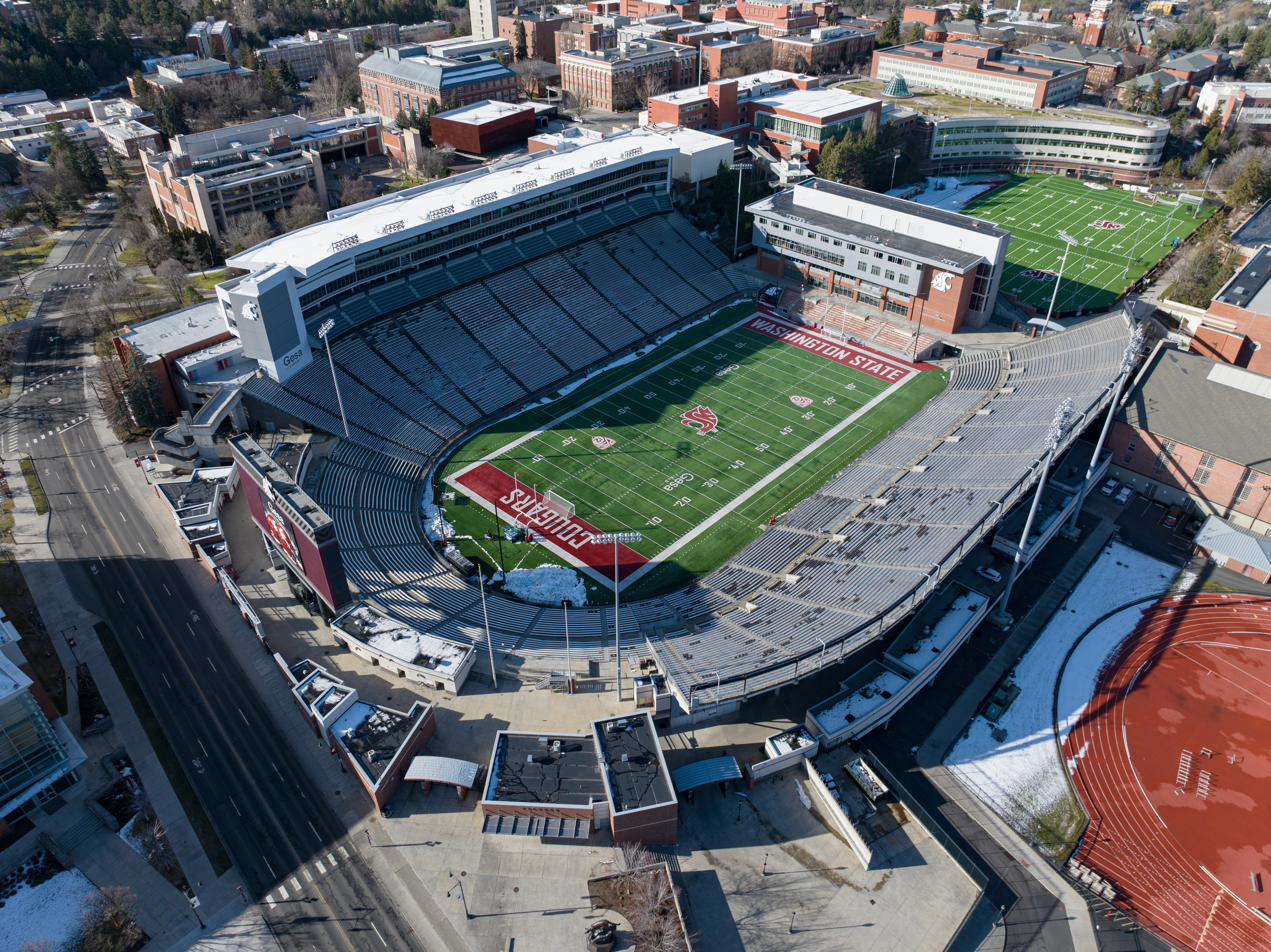
- Aerial view from northeast in 2024

- Location in the United States Location in Washington
- Interactive map of Martin Stadium
- Address: 720 NE Stadium Way
- Location: Washington State University; Pullman, Washington, U.S.
- Coordinates: 46.732°N 117.160°W
- Elevation: 2,510 feet (765 m) AMSL
- Owner: Washington State University
- Operator: Washington State University
- Capacity: 32,952 (2014–present)
- Surface: FieldTurf: (2000–present); Omniturf: (1990–1999); SuperTurf: (1979–1989); AstroTurf: (1972–1978)

Construction
- Groundbreaking: January 1, 1972
- Opened: September 30, 1972; 54 years ago
- Renovated: 1975, 1979, 1999, 2006, 2012
- Expanded: 1975: north grandstand 1979: track removed 2012: premium seating
- Cost: $1 million ($7.7 million in 2025) $150 million (renovation)
- Architect: Naramore Bain Brady & Johanson
- General contractor: Halvorson–Berg

Tenants
- Washington State Cougars (Pac-12, NCAA) (1972–present); Idaho Vandals (NCAA) (1999–2001)

Website
- Martin Stadium

View from northeast corner, October 2014

Martin Stadium is an outdoor athletic stadium in the Northwestern United States, on the campus of Washington State University in Pullman, Washington. It is the home field of the Washington State Cougars of the Pac-12 Conference.

Its full name is Gesa Field at Martin Stadium due to Richland-based Gesa Credit Union signing a 10-year sponsorship deal in 2021 for the playing surface; it has used artificial turf since its inception in 1972, with infilled FieldTurf used since 2000.

== History ==
The stadium is named after Clarence D. Martin (1886–1955), the former governor (1933–41), former mayor of Cheney, and 1906 graduate of the University of Washington. His son, Dan (Clarence D. Martin, Jr., 1916–1976), made a $250,000 donation to the project in January 1972 under the stipulation that the stadium be named after his father. Additional gifts were continued by Dan's widow, Charlotte Martin; $250,000 in 1978 and $150,000 in 1979.

Martin Stadium opened 54 years ago in 1972 on September 30, with a 19-point loss to Utah, then a member of the WAC, with 20,600 in attendance. Two and a half years had passed since the south grandstand and press box of its predecessor, the wooden Rogers Field, was significantly damaged by fire, a suspected case of arson. The WSU Cougars played all of their home games at Joe Albi Stadium in Spokane in 1970 and 1971. Aside from those two years, the Cougars have played at the site of Martin Stadium since 1895.

In its first season in 1972, only the south grandstand, press box, lights, and artificial turf were new; the remaining sections from Rogers (north sideline and east end zone) were replaced later. The seating capacity in 1972 was 22,600; the wooden north stands were demolished after the 1974 season, and the new concrete grandstand expanded the seating to 26,500 for 1975. (1975 aerial photo) The east end zone seats from Rogers were finally replaced in 1999. The stadium has an unorthodox east–west alignment; north-south is conventional (e.g. Joe Albi).

After renovations in 2003, seating capacity was reduced to 35,117, and was 32,952 in 2014. Since the expansion of Reser Stadium at Oregon State in 2005, Martin Stadium fell to last in football seating capacity in the Pac-10 and the Pac-12. The current attendance record was set during the championship year of 1997, when WSU beat Stanford on Senior Day in front of 40,306 on November 15. (They won the Apple Cup at Husky Stadium in Seattle the following week to win the Pac-10, and played in the Rose Bowl for the first time in 67 years.)

Despite its relatively small size, Martin Stadium has one of the highest ratios of seating capacity to population base; almost 1.1 seats per every citizen in the city of Pullman, and one for most in Whitman County. Following a 10–3 season and an undefeated home campaign in 2003, it was ranked by Sports Illustrated as one of the toughest stadiums for visiting teams in college football.

On March 12, 2021, WSU announced that the Washington State Board of Regents had approved a 10-year, $11 million minimum deal with Gesa Credit Union, a Richland-based financial institution, to sponsor the playing surface at the stadium. The deal had the surface renamed to Gesa Field; it did not include naming rights to the stadium.

=== 1979 expansion ===
Martin Stadium was among the first college football stadiums to expand by removing its 440-yard (402 m) running track and lowering the playing field, in this case by sixteen feet (5 m). This modification in 1979 added over 12,000 new seats, most of which were closer to the field (and the opponent's bench). The first game following the renovation was played in mid-October, a 17–14 homecoming upset of UCLA under sunny skies, which was WSU's first win over the Bruins in 21 years.

The Mooberry Track was constructed north of the stadium, then the site of the old Bailey baseball field, with home plate at the northwest corner. Baseball was relocated northeast, toward the golf course, to Bailey–Brayton Field. The original plan was for the track to occupy that space, but soil issues caused a revision. The new track debuted in the spring of 1980 and hosted its first event on May 3, a decisive dual-meet win over rival Washington.

=== 2006–2014 renovations and transformation ===
==== Phases I and II (2006–2008) ====
Phases I and II commenced at the end of the 2006 football season. The project focused on improving the public areas in and around the stadium. A new concourse was built along the north stands and new concessions and restrooms were also added throughout the stadium. Improvements were also made around the stadium perimeter including the construction of a new public plaza and ticket office at the stadium's northeast corner along with a monumental sign at the east edge of the stadium along Stadium Way. The existing scoreboard behind the west stands was also upgraded.

==== Phases III and IV: The Cougar Football Project (2011–2014) ====
Phases III and IV were branded as The Cougar Football Project and consisted of two major projects, and additional improvements in smaller projects that followed.

The first project, called the Southside Project, was an $80 million project that replaced the old press box on the south stands with a new structure that includes a new press box, club seats, loge boxes, luxury suites and a club room. Approximately 1,900 new seats were added in the premium seating area. The expansion also added 21 luxury suites (four, 24-person; nine, 18-person; and eight, 12-person), 42 loge boxes (27, four-person and 15, six-person) and approximately 1,300 club seats (1,200 outdoor and 100 indoor). The former press box did not have the amenities necessary for "first class" game productions with respect to national television and radio broadcasts as provided for in the new Pac-12 television and media contract. The Southside Project began demolition and construction in November 2011 and was completed by the first game of the 2012 season.

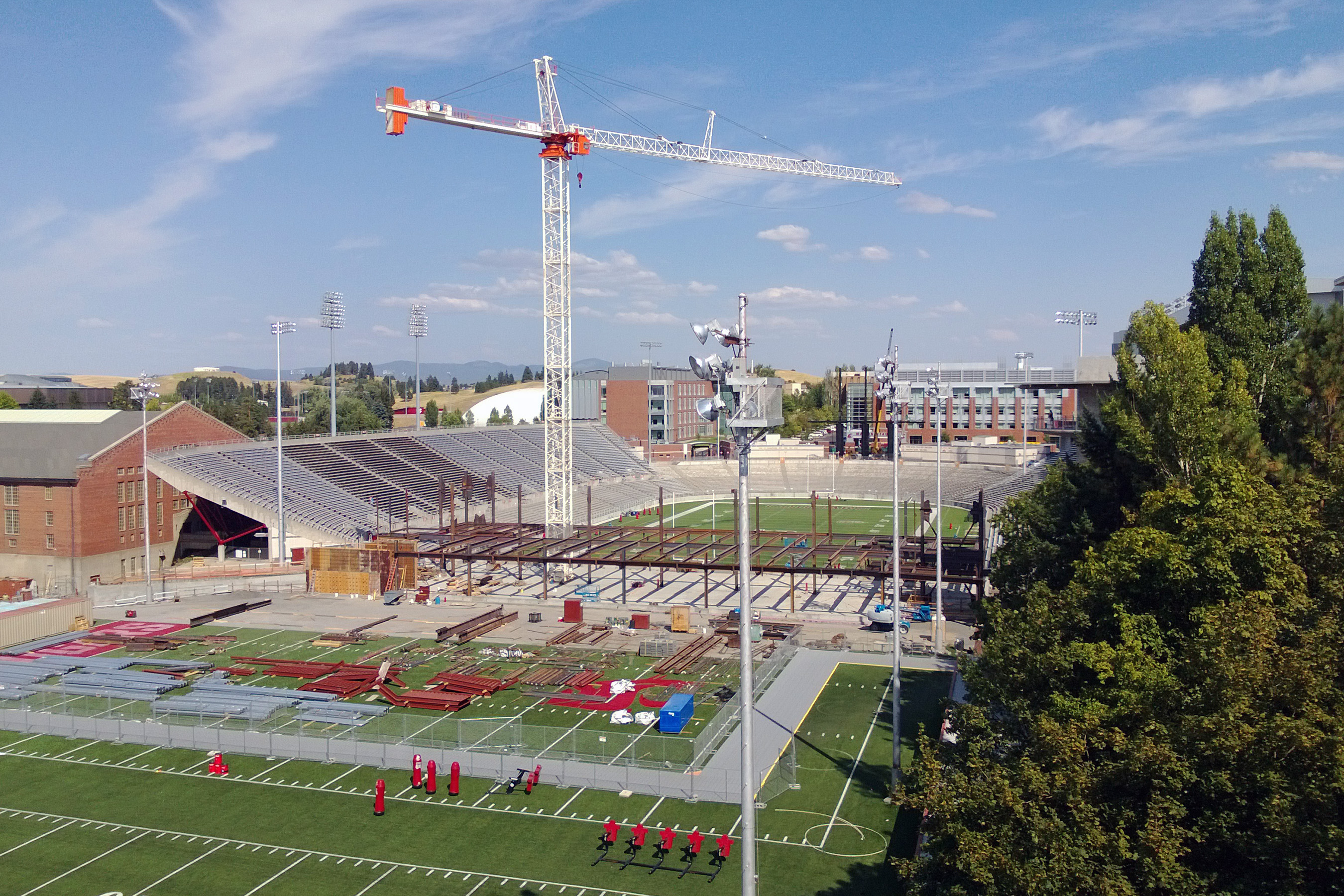
West End-Zone Project under construction in August 2013

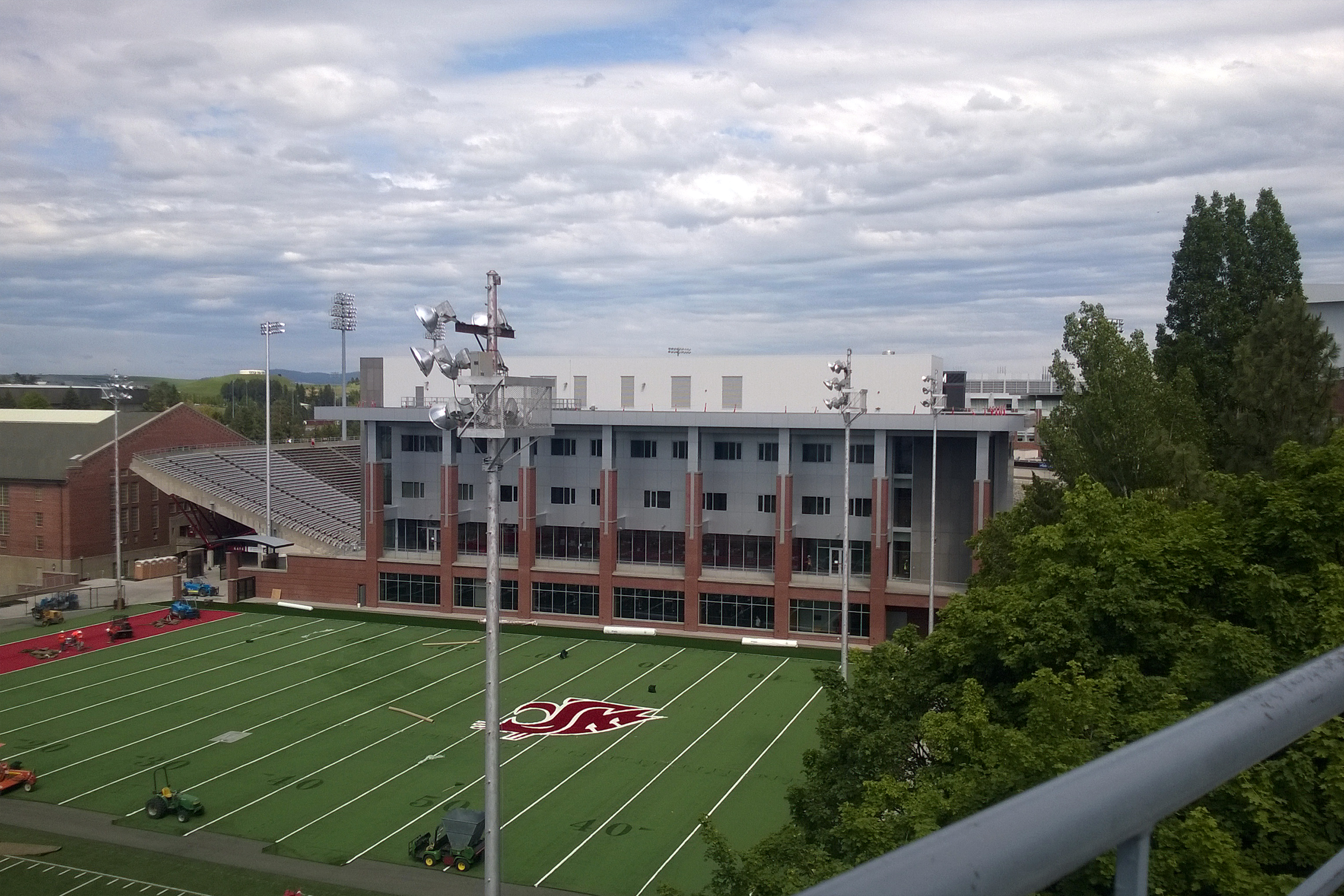
West End-Zone Project nearing completion in May 2014

The second project, called the West End-Zone Project, was a $61 million project that provided a new football operations center for the Cougar football program, including new weight/locker rooms, equipment and training areas for players. In addition to meeting rooms and coaches' offices, it will also feature a WSU football heritage area and a game-day home for former letter winners. The project was approved in November 2012, and construction began that month on November 26. This project was completed for the opening of the 2014 season. Additional improvements included A/V and architectural upgrades to the stadium. In response to the West End-Zone Project occupying the space where the scoreboard had been, a new video display was installed on the stadium's east end. It measures 73 by 36 feet (22 m × 11 m) and features the latest light emitting diode (LED) video technology. The video board is 112% larger than the previous board while producing a wider, more consistent viewing angle. The video display is more than double the size of the previous display with four times the resolution. It is one of the few HD Video Displays in college football as its 1708 x 840 resolution exceeds the HD standard. The project also included the installation of an LED Ribbon Board that measures four feet (1.2 m) tall by 347 feet (106 m) wide and runs along the length of the premium seating side. A ribbon board was then added above the north stands in 2014. Both the video and ribbon boards display game statistics and information, out of town scores, along with graphics, animations, crowd prompts, and opportunities for partner-related elements. A new custom audio system, which is integrated with the video and scoring system, was also installed and engineered to provide full-range sound reproduction and deliver clear and intelligible speech at Martin Stadium.

In time for the 2014 season, the concrete wall that separated the playing field from the stands was faced with brick, and galvanized steel railings painted black to give the stadium a more traditional feel and to architecturally integrate with the exterior finish materials used on the new Cougar Football Complex.

== Playing surface ==
The current playing surface is Revolution Fiber by FieldTurf, installed in the summer of 2014 as part of the budget inclusion for the $61 million Football Operations Building. Rev Fiber is the latest and most realistic grass-like surface available, also used at Ohio State and Notre Dame, and the NFL's Lumen Field and Gillette Stadium. Rev Turf has received a FIFA 2-star rating for soccer.

FieldTurf was first installed in 2000 and replaced in 2006, preceded by the sand-filled Omniturf of 1990. The original playing surface at Martin Stadium in 1972 was AstroTurf, replaced by SuperTurf in 1979, and again in 1984. The playing surface at Rogers Field was natural grass. The elevation of the field is approximately 2,510 feet (765 m) above sea level, which was the highest in the Pac-10, but became a distant third in the Pac-12 in 2011.

== Goalposts ==
Martin Stadium is one of only three in the FBS (formerly Division I-A) which uses goalposts with two support posts for all of its home games. The others are Doak Campbell Stadium at Florida State and Tiger Stadium at LSU. Single-support goalposts were torn down at Martin Stadium in 1982 and 1988, after Apple Cup victories.

The double posts at Martin debuted with the Omniturf in 1990. The distance between the uprights was narrowed for college football in 1991 to 18 ft 6 in (5.64 m), matching the NFL.

== Apple Cup ==
Rogers Field area in 2008, directly west of Martin Stadium

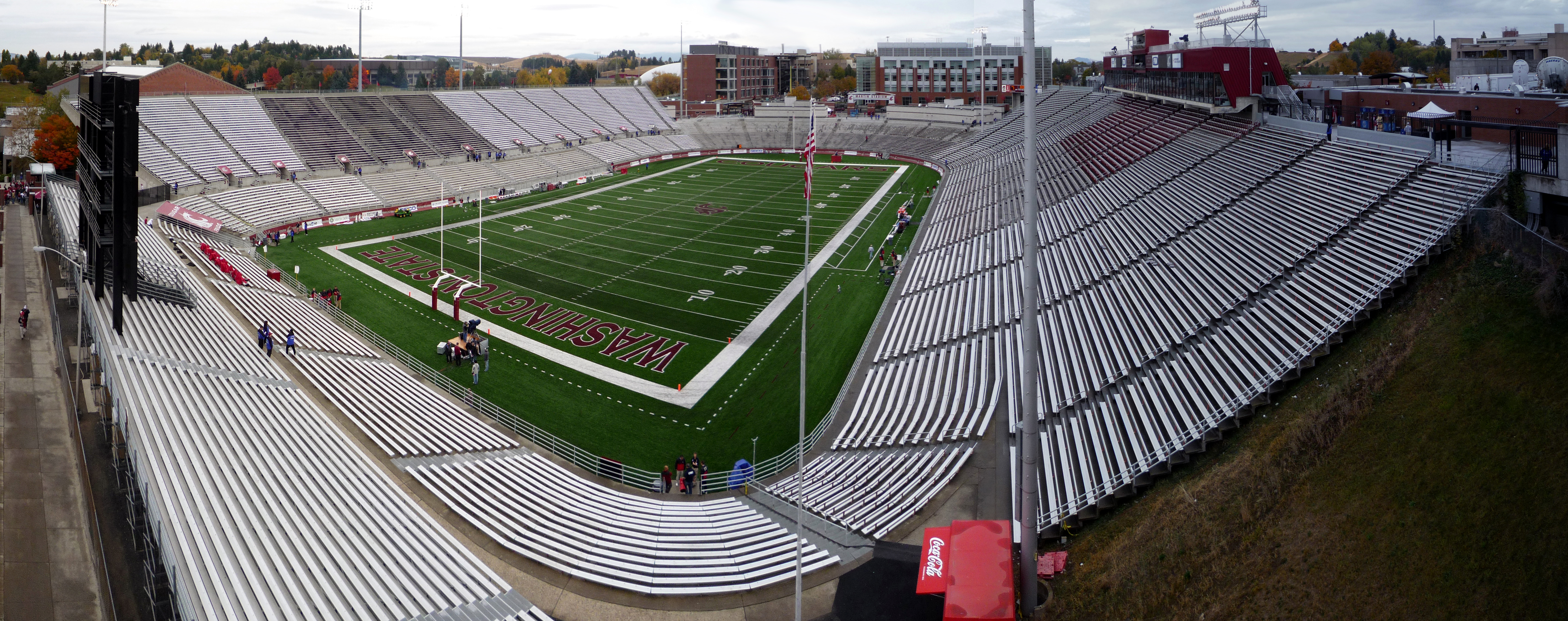
View from southwest corner in 2008, between the 2006 and 2012 renovations.

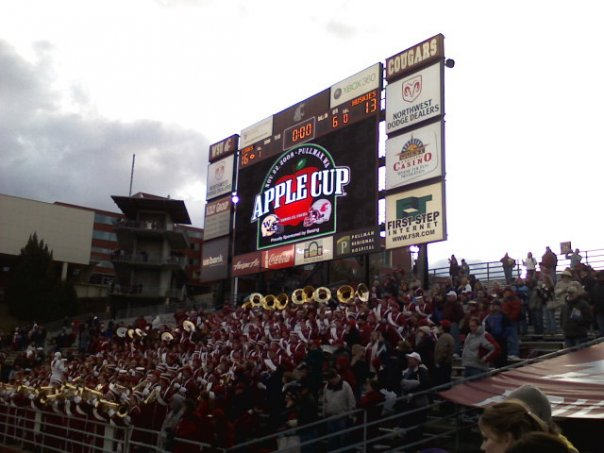
WSU defeated winless UW 16–13 in double overtime at the 2008 Apple Cup. The new west end scoreboard was part of phase II upgrades.

Washington State hosts the Apple Cup rivalry game with Washington in even-numbered years. Except for 1954, the Apple Cup was played at Joe Albi Stadium in Spokane from 1950 to 1980, rather than in Pullman. The Cougars went 3–12 (.200) in these fifteen Spokane Apple Cups (winning in 1958, 1968, and 1972), while winning the previous two games played in Pullman (1948, 1954).

Since 1982, a Cougar victory, all WSU home games in the rivalry have been played at Martin Stadium, with the Cougars winning seven of the 19 Pullman games (.368) through 2018; the most recent win was in 2012, in overtime.

== Sharing with a rival ==
For 2½ seasons, 1999–2001, the Idaho Vandals of nearby Moscow borrowed Martin Stadium to use as its home field, as Idaho transitioned from Division I-AA back up to I-A. At the time, the Vandals' Kibbie Dome was too small to support the NCAA's attendance requirements for Division I-A.

The attendance criteria changed, and Idaho has used the Kibbie Dome as its football home since. The Vandals continued as an FBS member through the 2017 season, after which they returned to FCS play in the Big Sky Conference, which the rest of the Idaho athletic program had rejoined in 2014.

Washington State and Idaho renewed their dormant football rivalry in 1998, and matched up annually in the Battle of the Palouse for a decade. The game was played at Martin Stadium in September, although the 2003 game was played far from the Palouse, 300 miles (500 km) west at year-old Seahawks Stadium (now Lumen Field) in Seattle. After a ten-year renewal, the Vandal head coach Robb Akey, a former WSU defensive coordinator, stated that he preferred the game not be played every year. The regular series ceased again after 2007; they met in 2013, 2016, 2022, and 2025.

== Fire at Rogers Field ==
At 10:30 p.m. on Saturday, April 4, 1970 (the first day of Spring break), residents heard what they described as a gunshot at the football stadium. By 2:00 a.m., the south grandstand and press box of the 1930s wooden venue had burned to the ground, witnessed by a thousand residents and firefighters. The exact cause, or offender, was never found, though there were several suspects.

The Cougars played their entire home schedule for the 1970 and 1971 football seasons at Joe Albi Stadium in Spokane. The fire also displaced the Idaho Vandals, whose wooden Neale Stadium was condemned before the 1969 season (and set afire by arson that November). The Vandals had used WSU's Rogers Field for its three Palouse home games in 1969 and were planning to use it again for four home games in 1970. Without another suitable stadium in the Moscow-Pullman vicinity, Idaho played its 1970 home schedule at the reduced capacity Rogers Field, returning to its Moscow campus in October 1971. The 1970 WSU-Idaho game in Spokane on September 19 was dubbed "The Displaced Bowl", and was easily won by the Cougars, 44–16, their only victory of the season.

The name "Rogers Field" continues on campus, transferred to areas used for intramural sports and football practices, west of the stadium.

== Tradition ==
The current public address announcer at Martin Stadium is Glenn Johnson, a professor emeritus at WSU who was also the mayor of Pullman for 20 years, retiring in 2023. Johnson is known for his first-down call of "And that's another... Cougar first down!" The crowd usually chants "...Cougar first down!" in unison along with Johnson.

== See also ==
- List of NCAA Division I FBS football stadiums
