= Mick Luckhurst =

English gridiron football player (born 1958)

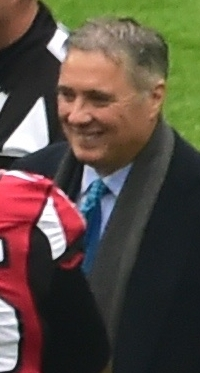

No. 18
- Position: Placekicker

Personal information
- Born: March 31, 1958 (age 68); Redbourn, United Kingdom
- Listed height: 6 ft 1 in (1.85 m)
- Listed weight: 180 lb (82 kg)

Career information
- High school: St Columba's College, St Albans, United Kingdom
- College: California
- NFL draft: 1981: undrafted

Career history
- Atlanta Falcons (1981–1987)

Awards and highlights
- PFWA All-Rookie Team (1981); Second-team All-Pac-10 (1980)

Career NFL statistics
- Field Goals Made: 115
- Field Goals Attempted: 164
- Field Goals %: 70.1
- Rushing yards: 17
- Rushing touchdowns: 1
- Stats at Pro Football Reference

Michael Christopher Wilbert Luckhurst (born March 31, 1958) is an English retired American football placekicker. One of the earliest British-born players in NFL history, he played his entire professional career with the Atlanta Falcons.

== Early life ==
Luckhurst was born on March 31, 1958, in Redbourn, Hertfordshire. He attended St Columba's College, St Albans in his home county (an academy equivalent to elementary plus high school in the USA). He then attended Balls Park teacher college in Hertford. As an exchange student to St. Cloud State University in Minnesota he decided to try out for the football team as part of a thesis project, and was soon impressing the coaches with 60+ yard field goals. Eventually he landed at the University of California at Berkeley, where he starred in rugby as well as American football.

Luckhurst was a full back and key player in leading the Cal Golden Bears to their first national collegiate rugby title in 1980, making 14 of 17 penalty kicks and 18 of 19 conversions during the season. He was the MVP in title game against the Air Force Academy, when he scored on two penalty kicks and a drop kick, accounting for 9 of Cal's 15 points in their come-from-behind win. Also according to an opponent in the championship game, "On several occasions he chased down one of our kicks and just before being tackled by our wing, kicked the ball backward over his head about 30 meters and into touch. Really frustrating."

In football, he scored 60 points in each of his two seasons 1979 and 1980. He also held the record for the longest field goal in California history for many years, a 54-yard boot against Oregon State in 1979.

== NFL career ==
Luckhurst joined the Atlanta Falcons in 1981 as an undrafted free agent. His first professional field goal was in the exhibition Hall of Fame game against the Cleveland Browns in August 1981. Eventually he beat out Tim Mazzetti, who himself was a successful former free agent. Luckhurst went on to make the Professional Football Writer's all-rookie team. He remained with the team until the 1987 NFL season. Luckhurst scored a rushing touchdown on a fake field goal for the team in their January 1983 playoff game against the Minnesota Vikings, the only rushing attempt of his career. At the time of his retirement, Luckhurst was the team's all-time leading scorer with 558 points.

== Retirement ==
After his playing days, Luckhurst became the face of American Football coverage on Channel 4 in his native UK between 1987 and 1991. Conversely, he was also an analyst for the American TV station TNT during its coverage of the 1990 World Cup.

On 26 October 2014, Luckhurst was part of the ceremonial coin toss at Wembley Stadium as the Atlanta Falcons faced the Detroit Lions in an International Series game.
