= Robert Lyons (American football) =

American football player and coach (1934–2019)

Biographical details
- Born: December 15, 1934; North Quincy, Massachusetts, U.S.
- Died: November 20, 2019 (aged 84); Boston, Massachusetts, U.S.

Playing career
- 1955–1957: Northeastern
- Position: Linebacker

Coaching career (HC unless noted)
- 1963–1971: Northeastern (line)
- 1972–1980: Northeastern

Head coaching record
- Overall: 34–52–1

Robert "Bo" Lyons (December 15, 1934 – November 20, 2019) was an American college football player and coach. He served as the head football coach at Northeastern University from 1972 to 1980, compiling a record of 34–52–1. Lyons played at Northwestern and was the line coach for the Northeastern Huskies for nine seasons under Joe Zabilski before succeeding him as head coach.

Lyons died in Boston on November 20, 2019, at the age of 84.

== Head coaching record ==
Year	Team	Overall	Conference	Standing	Bowl/playoffs
Northeastern Huskies (NCAA College Division independent) (1972)
1972	Northeastern	6–2			
Northeastern Huskies (NCAA Division II independent) (1973–1977)
1973	Northeastern	3–6			
1974	Northeastern	6–4			
1975	Northeastern	3–6			
1976	Northeastern	2–7			
1977	Northeastern	3–6–1			
Northeastern Huskies (NCAA Division I-AA independent) (1978–1980)
1978	Northeastern	6–5			
1979	Northeastern	3–7			
1980	Northeastern	2–9			
Northeastern:		34–52–1			
Total:		34–52–1			
