= 1979 Maine Black Bears football team =

American college football season

1979 Maine Black Bears football
- Conference: Yankee Conference
- Record: 2–9 (0–5 Yankee)
- Head coach: Jack Bicknell (4th season)
- Captains: Joseph Lipinski; Thomas Sullivan; Jonathan Weed
- Home stadium: Alumni Field

1979 Yankee Conference football standings
	Conf.					Overall
Team	W		L		T	W		L		T
No. 7 Boston University +	4	–	1	–	0	8	–	1	–	1
UMass +	4	–	1	–	0	6	–	4	–	0
Connecticut	3	–	1	–	1	3	–	6	–	2
New Hampshire	2	–	2	–	1	5	–	4	–	2
Maine	1	–	4	–	0	1	–	9	–	1
Rhode Island	0	–	5	–	0	2	–	9	–	0
+ – Conference co-champions; Rankings from Associated Press poll

The 1979 Maine Black Bears football team was an American football team that represented the University of Maine as a member of the Yankee Conference during the 1979 NCAA Division I-AA football season. In its fourth season under head coach Jack Bicknell, the team compiled a 2–9 record (0–5 against conference opponents) and finished fifth out of six teams in the Yankee Conference. Joseph Lipinski, Thomas Sullivan, and Jonathan Weed were the team captains.

== Schedule ==
Date	Opponent	Site	Result	Attendance	Source
September 8	Towson State*	Alumni Field; Orono, ME	L 7–13	6,400	
September 15	Boston University*	Alumni Field; Orono, ME	L 13–24		
September 22	at UMass	Alumni Stadium; Hadley, MA	L 14–38	3,990	
September 29	Central Connecticut	Alumni Field; Orono, ME	W 40–3	6,700	
October 6	at Rhode Island	Meade Stadium; Kingston, RI	L 0–10	8,158	
October 13	New Hampshire	Alumni Field; Orono, ME (rivalry)	L 0–23	7,000	
October 20	Connecticut	Alumni Field; Orono, ME	L 7–19		
October 27	at No. 7 Lafayette	Fisher Field; Easton, PA	W 34–21	6,000	
November 3	at No. 1 (D-II) Delaware	Delaware Stadium; Newark, DE	L 14–31	18,679	
November 10	at Lehigh	Taylor Stadium; Bethlehem, PA	L 6–12	5,000	
November 17	Northeastern	Alumni Field; Orono, ME	L 16–27		
*Non-conference game; Rankings from AP Poll released prior to the game

== After the season ==
The following Black Bear was selected in the 1980 NFL draft after the season.

Round	Pick	Player	Position	NFL club
21	316	Roger Lapham	Tight end	Buffalo Bills
