= 1979 Idaho Vandals football team =

American college football season

1979 Idaho Vandals football
- Conference: Big Sky Conference
- Record: 4–7 (2–5 Big Sky)
- Head coach: Jerry Davitch (2nd season)
- Offensive coordinator: Bill Tripp (2nd season)
- Offensive scheme: Veer
- Defensive coordinator: Tim Hundley (1st season)
- Base defense: 5–2
- Home stadium: Idaho Stadium

1979 Big Sky Conference football standings
	Conf.					Overall
Team	W		L		T	W		L		T
Boise State *	7	–	0	–	0	10	–	1	–	0
No. 9 Montana State $	6	–	1	–	0	6	–	4	–	0
No. 5 Nevada ^	5	–	2	–	0	8	–	4	–	0
No. T–10 Northern Arizona	3	–	4	–	0	7	–	4	–	0
Weber State	3	–	4	–	0	3	–	8	–	0
Idaho	2	–	5	–	0	4	–	7	–	0
Montana	2	–	5	–	0	3	–	7	–	0
Idaho State	0	–	7	–	0	0	–	11	–	0
$ – Conference champion; ^ – NCAA Division I-AA playoff participant; * – Boise State was on probation; Rankings from NCAA Division I-AA AP Poll

The 1979 Idaho Vandals football team represented the University of Idaho in the 1979 NCAA Division I-AA football season. The Vandals were led by second-year head coach Jerry Davitch and were members of the Big Sky Conference. They played their home games at the Kibbie Dome, an indoor facility on campus in Moscow, Idaho.

With quarterbacks Jay Goodenbour and Rob Petrillo running the veer offense, the Vandals were 4–7 overall and 2–5 in the Big Sky. They won four of five in mid-season, but dropped their final four games. Idaho lost to rival Boise State for the third straight year; the Broncos went undefeated in conference play but were on probation for a scouting violation and not eligible for the title or the I-AA playoffs.

== Notable players ==
Junior running back Glen White was the Vandals' leading rusher in 1979, the best season by a UI running back in the 1970s. He missed the opener at Fresno, but gained 889 yards and averaged 5.0 yards per carry in the final ten games; in the game at Idaho State, he rushed for 163 yards on 19 carries. A military brat, White graduated from Kaiserslautern American High School in West Germany in 1977. All-Europe for two seasons, he had not been recruited by college football programs; a high school coach was a former Vandal and alerted UI head coach Ed Troxel.

While in off-season training in February 1980, White felt weakness and underwent medical testing in Moscow and Seattle. Diagnosed with aplastic anemia, he battled it for several months until his death from complications on August 9 at an Oklahoma City hospital, near his parents' home at Fort Sill. White, age 22, was posthumously designated an honorary team captain for all eleven games in 1980, and his Vandal teammates wore his number 32 on the left side of their helmets in tribute.

Future NFL linebacker Sam Merriman of Tucson, Arizona, was a standout on defense in 1979 as a true freshman.

== Schedule ==
Date	Time	Opponent	Site	Result	Attendance	Source
September 8	7:30 p.m.	at Fresno State*	Ratcliffe Stadium; Fresno, CA	L 10–30	11,418	
September 15	7:00 p.m.	at Northern Arizona	NAU Skydome; Flagstaff, AZ	L 18–29	13,056	
September 22	7:30 p.m.	Pacific (CA)*	Kibbie Dome; Moscow, ID	W 17–13	10,500	
September 29	7:30 p.m.	Puget Sound*	Kibbie Dome; Moscow, ID	W 34–10		
October 6	7:00 p.m.	at Idaho State	ASISU Minidome; Pocatello, ID	W 28–23	8,175	
October 13	7:30 p.m.	Boise State	Kibbie Dome; Moscow, ID (rivalry)	L 17–41	15,500	
October 20	1:30 p.m.	Montana^{†}	Kibbie Dome; Moscow, ID (Little Brown Stein)	W 20–17	14,200	
October 27	12:30 p.m.	at No. 9 Montana State	Reno H. Sales Stadium; Bozeman, MT	L 20–28	7,127	
November 3	1:30 p.m.	Nevada	Kibbie Dome; Moscow, ID	L 26–38	5,500	
November 10	12:30 p.m.	at Weber State	Wildcat Stadium; Ogden, UT	L 7–12	2,323	
November 17	1:30 p.m.	No. 8 (D-II) South Dakota State*	Kibbie Dome; Moscow, ID	L 13–27	6,000	
*Non-conference game; ^{†}Homecoming; Rankings from AP Poll released prior to the game; All times are in Pacific time

== Roster ==
1979 Idaho Vandals football team roster
Players
Coaches
Offense

Pos.	#	Name	Class
QB	10	Jay Goodenbour	Jr
QB		Rob Petrillo	So
RB	3	Russell Davis	So
RB, WR	12	Rocky Tuttle (C)	Sr
RB	30	Tim Lappano	Sr
RB	32	Glen White	Jr
RB	33	Terry Idler (injured)	So
RB	40	Randy Davenport	Jr
TE		Al Swenson	Fr
TE	85	Dan Meyer	Sr
WR, TE	88	Mike Hagadone	Sr
WR	7	Jack Klein	So
WR		John Palumbo	Jr
LT	74	Bruce Fery	So
LT		Royal Hart	Jr
LG		Dave Monico	Jr
C	69	Larry Coombs	Sr
RG		John Girnt	Jr
RT	70	Kyle Riddell	Sr

Defense

Pos.	#	Name	Class
DE	43	Larry Barker	Jr
DT	78	Steve Parker	Sr
NG		Steve Nelson	So
NG	75	Monty Elder	Jr
DT	71	Mark McNeal (C)	Sr
DE		Jay Hayes	So
LB	50	Mike Hasfurther	Sr
LB		Marty Marshall	Sr
LB	51	Chris Eads	Sr
LB	52	Sam Merriman	Fr
LB	83	Phil Vance	Sr
LB	90	Lloyd Williamson	Fr
CB	34	Mike Keough	Jr
FS	22	Ray McCanna	Jr
SS	25	Kelly Miller	So
SS		Marc Watts
SS		Rick Brown	Jr
CB		Carlton McBride	Jr
CB	20	Ron Jessie	Sr

Special teams

Pos.	#	Name	Class
P	2	Dion Jergo	So
P		Chris Brockman	Jr
PK		Mike Browne	Sr
PK	6	Pete O'Brien	So

Head coach

- Jerry Davitch (2nd year)

Coordinators/assistant coaches

- Bill Tripp (OC)
- Tim Hundley (DC)

Legend

- (C) Team captain
- (S) Suspended
- (I) Ineligible
- Injured
- Redshirt

== All-conference ==
Tackle Kyle Riddell, center Larry Coombs, defensive tackle Mark McNeal, and placekicker Pete O'Brien were named to the all-conference team. Second team selections were safety Ray McCanna and linebacker Sam Merriman, a true freshman.

== NFL draft ==
One Vandal senior was selected in the 1980 NFL draft, which lasted 12 rounds (333 selections).

Player	Position	Round	Overall	Franchise
Mark McNeal	DE	6th	153	Seattle Seahawks
