= Jim Thomas (running back) =

American gridiron football player and coach (1938–2015)

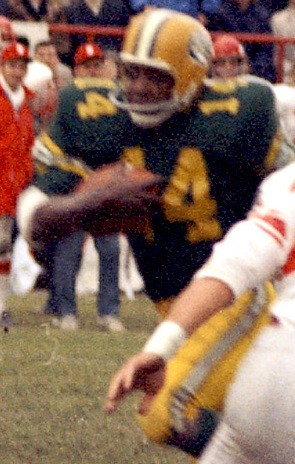
- Thomas with the Edmonton Eskimos in 1970

No. 12, 14, 20, 23
- Position: Running back

Personal information
- Born: December 18, 1938; Columbus, Mississippi, U.S.
- Died: October 4, 2015 (aged 76); Columbus, Mississippi, U.S.
- Listed height: 6 ft 2 in (1.88 m)
- Listed weight: 195 lb (88 kg)

Career information
- College: Mississippi Industrial College

Career history
- 1963–1971: Edmonton Eskimos

Awards and highlights
- 2× CFL All-Star (1966, 1967); 3× CFL West All-Star (1965, 1966, 1967); Eskimos record: Longest run (104) – October 9, 1965

James T. "Long Gone" Thomas (December 18, 1938 – October 4, 2015) was an American gridiron football player and coach. He played professionally as a running back for nine seasons in the Canadian Football League CFL) with the Edmonton Eskimos. Thomas ran for 6,161 yards in his CFL career and was a two-time CFL All-Star. He signed to the Los Angeles Rams of the National Football League (NFL) in 1970 for a five-game trial, but returned to Edmonton.

Thomas holds the record for the three longest rushing touchdowns in Eskimos history—a 104-yard run on October 9, 1965, against the BC Lions, a 100-yard run on August 2, 1966, against the Winnipeg Blue Bombers, and a 97-yard run on September 4, 1964, against the Ottawa Rough Riders.

Thomas attended R. E. Hunt High School in Columbus, Mississippi, a segregated school for blacks only. He attended college at Mississippi Industrial College in Holly Springs, Mississippi.

After his playing career was over, Thomas earned a master's degree from Southwestern Oklahoma State University. He coached in college at Southwestern Oklahoma State and the University of Mississippi (Ole Miss) as well as Noxubee County High School, Houston High School, and in Memphis before winding up at Mississippi Valley State University.

Thomas died in 2015.

== Head coaching record ==
Year	Team	Overall	Conference	Standing	Bowl/playoffs
Mississippi Valley State Delta Devils (Southwestern Athletic Conference) (1978–1979)
1978	Mississippi Valley State	6–3–1	3–2–1	3rd	
1979	Mississippi Valley State	4–5	2–4	5th	
Mississippi Valley State:		10–8–1	5–6–1		
Total:		10–8–1			
