= 1979 Northern Arizona Lumberjacks football team =

American college football season

1979 Northern Arizona Lumberjacks football
- Conference: Big Sky Conference

Ranking
- AP: No. T–10 (I-AA)
- Record: 7–4 (3–4 Big Sky)
- Head coach: Dwain Painter (1st season)
- Home stadium: NAU Skydome

1979 Big Sky Conference football standings
	Conf.					Overall
Team	W		L		T	W		L		T
Boise State *	7	–	0	–	0	10	–	1	–	0
No. 9 Montana State $	6	–	1	–	0	6	–	4	–	0
No. 5 Nevada ^	5	–	2	–	0	8	–	4	–	0
No. T–10 Northern Arizona	3	–	4	–	0	7	–	4	–	0
Weber State	3	–	4	–	0	3	–	8	–	0
Idaho	2	–	5	–	0	4	–	7	–	0
Montana	2	–	5	–	0	3	–	7	–	0
Idaho State	0	–	7	–	0	0	–	11	–	0
$ – Conference champion; ^ – NCAA Division I-AA playoff participant; * – Boise State was on probation; Rankings from NCAA Division I-AA AP Poll

The 1979 Northern Arizona Lumberjacks football team represented Northern Arizona University as a member of the Big Sky Conference during the 1979 NCAA Division I-AA football season. Led by first-year head coach Bud Hake, the Lumberjacks compiled an overall record of 7–4, with a mark of 3–4 in conference play, and finished tied for fourth in the Big Sky.

== Schedule ==
Date	Opponent	Rank	Site	Result	Attendance	Source
September 8	at Portland State*		Civic Stadium; Portland, OR	W 22–21	8,382	
September 15	Idaho		NAU Skydome; Flagstaff, AZ	W 29–18	13,056	
September 22	Montana	No. 6	NAU Skydome; Flagstaff, AZ	W 26–13	11,887	
September 29	at Idaho State	No. 3	ASISU Minidome; Pocatello, ID	W 6–3	5,563	
October 6	North Dakota State*	No. T–3	NAU Skydome; Flagstaff, AZ	W 21–10	16,481	
October 13	at Weber State	No. 4	Stewart Stadium; Ogden, UT	L 10–34	7,135	
October 20	Montana State	No. 6	NAU Skydome; Flagstaff, AZ	L 7–10	9,166	
October 27	Northern Colorado*		NAU Skydome; Flagstaff, AZ	W 16–7	11,857	
November 3	at Boise State		Bronco Stadium; Boise, ID	L 7–44	20,686	
November 17	Cal Poly Pomona*		NAU Skydome; Flagstaff, AZ	W 21–3	8,781	
November 24	No. T–7 Nevada	No. T–7	NAU Skydome; Flagstaff, AZ	L 7–31		
*Non-conference game; Rankings from Associated Press Poll released prior to the game
