= 1979 Weber State Wildcats football team =

American college football season

1979 Weber State Wildcats football
- Conference: Big Sky Conference
- Record: 3–8 (3–4 Big Sky)
- Head coach: Pete Riehlman (3rd season)
- Home stadium: Wildcat Stadium

1979 Big Sky Conference football standings
	Conf.					Overall
Team	W		L		T	W		L		T
Boise State *	7	–	0	–	0	10	–	1	–	0
No. 9 Montana State $	6	–	1	–	0	6	–	4	–	0
No. 5 Nevada ^	5	–	2	–	0	8	–	4	–	0
No. T–10 Northern Arizona	3	–	4	–	0	7	–	4	–	0
Weber State	3	–	4	–	0	3	–	8	–	0
Idaho	2	–	5	–	0	4	–	7	–	0
Montana	2	–	5	–	0	3	–	7	–	0
Idaho State	0	–	7	–	0	0	–	11	–	0
$ – Conference champion; ^ – NCAA Division I-AA playoff participant; * – Boise State was on probation; Rankings from NCAA Division I-AA AP Poll

The 1979 Weber State Wildcats football team represented Weber State College (now known as Weber State University) as a member of the Big Sky Conference during the 1979 NCAA Division I-AA football season. Led by third-year head coach Pete Riehlman, the Wildcats compiled an overall record of 3–8, with a mark of 3–4 in conference play, and finished tied for fourth in the Big Sky.

== Schedule ==
Date	Time	Opponent	Site	Result	Attendance	Source
September 8		at North Dakota State*	Dacotah Field; Fargo, ND	L 10–11	10,150	
September 15		at BYU*	Cougar Stadium; Provo, UT	L 3–48	33,161	
September 22		Portland State*	Stewart Stadium; Ogden, UT	L 13–16	10,037	
September 29		at Montana	Dornblaser Field; Missoula, MT	L 16–23		
October 6		at Montana State	Reno H. Sales Stadium; Bozeman, MT	L 21–40		
October 13		No. 4 Northern Arizona	Stewart Stadium; Ogden, UT	W 34–10	7,135	
October 20		at Nevada	Wildcat Stadium; Reno, NV	L 3–22	9,362	
October 27	1:30 pm	Boise State	Stewart Stadium; Ogden, UT	L 7–23	6,110	
November 3		at Idaho State	ASISU Minidome; Pocatello, ID	W 14–10		
November 10	1:30 pm	Idaho	Stewart Stadium; Ogden, UT	W 12–7	2,323	
November 17		Utah State*	Stewart Stadium; Ogden, UT	L 10–34	7,707	
*Non-conference game; Rankings from NCAA Division I-AA Football Committee Poll released prior to the game; All times are in Mountain time
