= 1979 NCAA Division I-AA Football Championship Game =

College American football game

1979 NCAA Division I-AA Football Championship
- I-AA National Championship Game
Lehigh Engineers	Eastern Kentucky Colonels
(10–2)	(10–2)
Independent	Ohio Valley
7	30
Head coach: John Whitehead	Head coach: Roy Kidd
AP 3 (tied)	AP 3 (tied)
	1	2	3	4	Total
Lehigh	0	7	0	0	7
Eastern Kentucky	7	7	7	9	30
- Date: December 15, 1979
- Season: 1979
- Stadium: Orlando Stadium
- Location: Orlando, Florida
- Attendance: 5,200

United States TV coverage
- Network: ABC Sports
- Announcers: Bill Flemming (play-by-play), Frank Broyles (color)

The 1979 NCAA Division I-AA Football Championship Game was a postseason college football game between the Eastern Kentucky Colonels and the Lehigh Engineers (now the Lehigh Mountain Hawks). The game was played on December 15, 1979, at Orlando Stadium (now Camping World Stadium) in Orlando, Florida. The culminating game of the 1979 NCAA Division I-AA football season, it was won by Eastern Kentucky, 30–7.

== Teams ==
The participants of the Championship Game were the finalists of the 1979 I-AA Playoffs, which began with a four-team bracket.

=== Eastern Kentucky Colonels ===
Eastern Kentucky finished their regular season with a 9–2 record (5–1 in conference); their losses were to East Tennessee State of Division I-A and conference rival Murray State. Tied for third with Lehigh in the final AP Poll for I-AA, the Colonels were the at-large selection to the four-team playoff; they defeated Nevada, the West selection, by a score of 33–30 in double overtime to reach the final. This was the first appearance for Eastern Kentucky in a Division I-AA championship game.

=== Lehigh Engineers ===
Lehigh also finished their regular season with a 9–2 record; they had lost to Colgate of Division I-A and Delaware of Division II. Tied with Eastern Kentucky for third in the final AP Poll for I-AA, the Engineers were the East selection to the playoff; they defeated Murray State, the South selection, by a 28–9 score to reach the final. This was also the first appearance for Lehigh in a Division I-AA championship game.

== Game summary ==
=== Scoring summary ===
Scoring summary

Quarter	Time	Drive			Team	Scoring information	Score	
Quarter	Time	Plays	Yards	TOP	Team	Scoring information	LEH	EKU
1	3:37				EKU	Bill Hughes 1-yard touchdown run, David Flores kick good	0	7
2					EKU	Nicky Yeast 1-yard touchdown run, Flores kick good	0	14
2					LEH	Bob Romeo 1-yard touchdown run, Ted Iobst kick good	7	14
3					EKU	Dale Patton 2-yard touchdown run, Flores kick good	7	21
4					EKU	29-yard field goal by Flores	7	24
4					EKU	Tony Braxton 14-yard touchdown run, 2-point pass failed	7	30
"TOP" = time of possession. For other American football terms, see Glossary of American football.							7	30

=== Game statistics ===
	1	2	3	4	Total
Engineers	0	7	0	0	7
Colonels	7	7	7	9	30

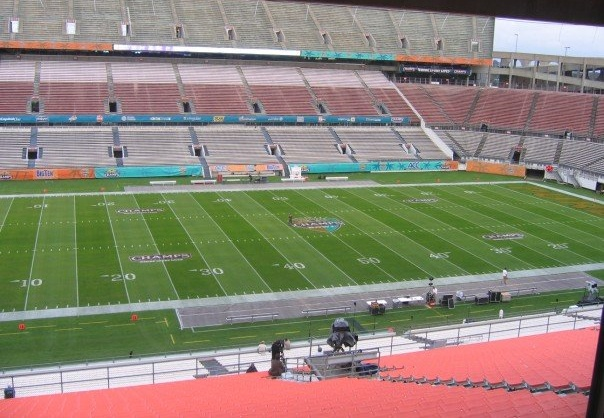
Orlando Stadium, site of the 1979 I-AA title game

Statistics	LEH	EKU
First downs	10	16
Plays–yards	56–204	74–338
Rushes–yards	33–102	69–289
Passing yards	102	49
Passing: comp–att–int	6–23–4	1–5–2
Time of possession		

Team	Category	Player	Statistics
Lehigh	Passing	Rich Andres	6–19, 102 yds, 2 INT
Lehigh	Rushing	Joe Rabuck	17 car, 55 yds
Lehigh	Receiving	Paul Anastasio	2 rec, 42 yds
Eastern Kentucky	Passing	Bill Hughes	1–5, 49 yds, 2 INT
Eastern Kentucky	Rushing	Dale Patton	21 car, 121 yds, 1 TD
Eastern Kentucky	Receiving	Jerry Parrish	1 rec, 49 yds

== See also ==
- 1979 NCAA Division I-AA football rankings
