= 1979 Montana Grizzlies football team =

American college football season

1979 Montana Grizzlies football
- Conference: Big Sky Conference
- Record: 3–7 (2–5 Big Sky)
- Head coach: Gene Carlson (4th season)
- Defensive coordinator: Pokey Allen (3rd season)
- Home stadium: Dornblaser Field

1979 Big Sky Conference football standings
	Conf.					Overall
Team	W		L		T	W		L		T
Boise State *	7	–	0	–	0	10	–	1	–	0
No. 9 Montana State $	6	–	1	–	0	6	–	4	–	0
No. 5 Nevada ^	5	–	2	–	0	8	–	4	–	0
No. T–10 Northern Arizona	3	–	4	–	0	7	–	4	–	0
Weber State	3	–	4	–	0	3	–	8	–	0
Idaho	2	–	5	–	0	4	–	7	–	0
Montana	2	–	5	–	0	3	–	7	–	0
Idaho State	0	–	7	–	0	0	–	11	–	0
$ – Conference champion; ^ – NCAA Division I-AA playoff participant; * – Boise State was on probation; Rankings from NCAA Division I-AA AP Poll

The 1979 Montana Grizzlies football team was an American football team that represented the University of Montana in the Big Sky Conference during the 1979 NCAA Division I-AA football season. In their fourth year under head coach Gene Carlson, the team compiled a 3–7 record.

Montana won three games and Carlson was let go at the end of the season; his annual salary was $24,000.

== Schedule ==
Date	Opponent	Site	Result	Attendance	Source
September 15	at Washington State*	Joe Albi Stadium; Spokane, WA	L 14–34	20,157	
September 22	at No. 6 Northern Arizona	NAU Skydome; Flagstaff, AZ	L 13–26	11,887	
September 29	Weber State	Dornblaser Field; Missoula, MT	W 23–16		
October 6	Boise State	Dornblaser Field; Missoula, MT	L 35–37	6,129	
October 13	Idaho State	Dornblaser Field; Missoula, MT	W 28–24	6,626	
October 20	at Idaho	Kibbie Dome; Moscow, ID (Little Brown Stein)	L 17–20	14,200	
October 27	Nevada*	Dornblaser Field; Missoula, MT	L 20–27	5,163	
November 3	at No. 8 Montana State	Reno H. Sales Stadium; Bozeman, MT (rivalry)	L 21–38		
November 10	at Northern Colorado*	Jackson Field; Greeley, CO	W 20–10		
November 17	Portland State*	Dornblaser Field; Missoula, MT	L 32–40	3,434	
*Non-conference game; Rankings from Associated Press Poll released prior to the game
