= 1979 Holy Cross Crusaders football team =

American college football season

1979 Holy Cross Crusaders football
- Conference: Independent
- Record: 5–6
- Head coach: Neil Wheelwright (4th season)
- Captains: Larry Ewald; Glenn Verrette
- Home stadium: Fitton Field

1979 NCAA Division I-A independents football records
	Conf.					Overall
Team	W		L		T	W		L		T
No. 6 Florida State		–		–		11	–	1	–	0
No. 7 Pittsburgh		–		–		11	–	1	–	0
UNLV		–		–		9	–	1	–	2
No. 17 Temple		–		–		10	–	2	–	0
Tulane		–		–		9	–	3	–	0
Rutgers		–		–		8	–	3	–	0
Tennessee State		–		–		8	–	3	–	0
East Carolina		–		–		7	–	3	–	1
No. 20 Penn State		–		–		8	–	4	–	0
South Carolina		–		–		8	–	4	–	0
Navy		–		–		7	–	4	–	0
Notre Dame		–		–		7	–	4	–	0
Southern Miss		–		–		6	–	4	–	1
Syracuse		–		–		7	–	5	–	0
Colgate		–		–		5	–	4	–	1
Boston College		–		–		5	–	6	–	0
Holy Cross		–		–		5	–	6	–	0
Memphis State		–		–		5	–	6	–	0
Miami (FL)		–		–		5	–	6	–	0
North Texas State		–		–		5	–	6	–	0
Villanova		–		–		5	–	6	–	0
Virginia Tech		–		–		5	–	6	–	0
West Virginia		–		–		5	–	6	–	0
Georgia Tech		–		–		4	–	6	–	1
Louisville		–		–		4	–	6	–	1
William & Mary		–		–		4	–	7	–	0
Illinois State		–		–		3	–	8	–	0
Northeast Louisiana		–		–		3	–	8	–	0
Army		–		–		2	–	8	–	1
Air Force		–		–		2	–	9	–	0
Cincinnati		–		–		2	–	9	–	0
Richmond		–		–		0	–	11	–	0
Rankings from AP Poll

The 1979 Holy Cross Crusaders football team was an American football team that represented the College of the Holy Cross as an independent during the 1979 NCAA Division I-A football season. Neil Wheelwright returned for his fourth year as head coach. For the second year in a row, the team compiled a record of 5–6.

All home games were played at Fitton Field on the Holy Cross campus in Worcester, Massachusetts.

== Schedule ==
Date	Opponent	Site	Result	Attendance	Source
September 8	at Rutgers	Rutgers Stadium; Piscataway, NJ	L 0–28	18,350	
September 15	at New Hampshire	Cowell Stadium; Durham, NH	L 17–26	12,500	
September 22	Rhode Island	Fitton Field; Worcester, MA	W 35–6	6,121	
October 6	at Dartmouth	Memorial Field; Hanover, NH	W 13–7	6,121	
October 13	Colgate^{†}	Fitton Field; Worcester, MA	L 16–17	12,241	
October 20	at Villanova	Villanova Stadium; Villanova, PA	L 14–29	9,700	
October 27	Brown	Fitton Field; Worcester, MA	W 14–7	10,011	
November 3	No. 3 Boston University^	Fitton Field; Worcester, MA	L 7–16	3,711	
November 10	at No. 9 UMass	Alumni Stadium; Hadley, MA	W 20–18	6,300	
November 24	at Connecticut	Memorial Stadium; Storrs, CT	W 28–12	5,597	
December 1	Boston College	Alumni Stadium; Chestnut Hill, MA (rivalry)	L 10–13	20,141	
^{†}Homecoming; ^ Family Weekend; Rankings from AP Poll released prior to the game

== Statistical leaders ==
Statistical leaders for the 1979 Crusaders included:

- Rushing: Larry Ewald, 614 yards and 4 touchdowns on 160 attempts
- Passing: Neil Solomon, 1,046 yards, 70 completions and 5 touchdowns on 144 attempts
- Receiving: Phil Johnson, 662 yards and 3 touchdowns on 46 receptions
- Scoring: Crocky Nangle, 36 points from 6 touchdowns
- Total offense: Neil Solomon, 998 yards (1,046 passing, minus-48 rushing)
- All-purpose yards: Larry Ewald, 1,178 yards (614 rushing, 425 returning, 139 receiving)
- Interceptions: John McNally, 5 interceptions for 19 yards
- Tackles: Steve Gannon, 143 total tackles (74 solo, 69 assist)
