= 1979 Northeastern Huskies football team =

American college football season

1979 Northeastern Huskies football
- Conference: Independent
- Record: 3–7
- Head coach: Robert Lyons (8th season)
- Home stadium: Parsons Field

1979 NCAA Division I-AA independents football standings
	Conf.			Overall
Team	W	L	T	W		L		T
No. 4 Lehigh ^		–		10	–	3	–	0
Florida A&M		–		7	–	4	–	0
Portland State		–		6	–	5	–	0
Lafayette		–		5	–	3	–	2
Bucknell		–		4	–	4	–	2
Northwestern State		–		3	–	6	–	0
Northeastern		–		3	–	7	–	0
^ – NCAA Division I-AA playoff participant; Rankings from Associated Press poll

The 1979 Northeastern Huskies football team was an American football team that represented Northeastern University as an independent during the 1979 NCAA Division I-AA football season. Led by eighth-year head coach Robert Lyons, the team compiled a 3–7 record.

== Schedule ==
Date	Opponent	Site	Result	Attendance	Source
September 15	Rhode Island	Parsons Field; Brookline, MA	W 17–7	3,567	
September 22	at C. W. Post	Hickox Field; Greenvale, NY	L 7–9		
September 29	at No. 4 Boston University	Nickerson Field; Boston, MA	L 10–35		
October 6	Springfield	Parsons Field; Brookline, MA	L 15–46		
October 13	at Southern Connecticut	Bowen Field; New Haven, CT	W 35–10	450	
October 20	at West Chester	John A. Farrell Stadium; West Chester, PA	L 30–34		
October 27	at New Hampshire	Cowell Stadium; Durham, NH	L 8–20		
November 3	Bucknell	Parsons Field; Brookline, MA	L 6–14	1,522	
November 10	at Central Connecticut	Arute Field; New Britain, CT	L 21–35		
November 17	at Maine	Alumni Field; Orono, ME	W 27–16		
Rankings from Associated Press Poll released prior to the game
