= 1979 Texas Southern Tigers football team =

American college football season

1979 Texas Southern Tigers football
- Conference: Southwestern Athletic Conference
- Record: 3–8 (1–5 SWAC)
- Head coach: Jim Sorey (1st season)
- Home stadium: Robertson Stadium; Rice Stadium; Astrodome

1979 Southwestern Athletic Conference football standings
	Conf.					Overall
Team	W		L		T	W		L		T
No. 6 Alcorn State +	5	–	1	–	0	8	–	2	–	0
No. 1 Grambling State +	5	–	1	–	0	8	–	3	–	0
No. 8 Jackson State	4	–	2	–	0	8	–	3	–	0
No. T–10 Southern	4	–	2	–	0	7	–	4	–	0
Mississippi Valley State	2	–	4	–	0	4	–	5	–	0
Texas Southern	1	–	5	–	0	3	–	8	–	0
Prairie View A&M	0	–	6	–	0	0	–	11	–	0
+ – Conference co-champions; This conference was a hybrid of NCAA Division I-AA and Division II and programs. Prairie View was classified as Division II. All the other teams were I-AA.; Rankings from Associated Press poll

The 1979 Texas Southern Tigers football team represented Texas Southern University as a member of the Southwestern Athletic Conference (SWAC) during the 1979 NCAA Division I-AA football season. Led by first-year head coach Jim Sorey, the Tigers compiled an overall record of 3–8, with a mark of 1–5 in conference play, and finished sixth in the SWAC.

== Schedule ==
Date	Opponent	Site	Result	Source
September 8	Bethune–Cookman*	Robertson Stadium; Houston, TX	W 12–9	
September 15	at Southern	University Stadium; Baton Rouge, LA	L 0–21	
September 22	vs. Tennessee State*	Liberty Bowl Memorial Stadium; Memphis, TN	L 3–21	
September 29	vs. Texas A&I*	Alamo Stadium; San Antonio, TX	L 7–31	
October 6	Alcorn State	Rice Stadium; Houston, TX	L 7–9	
October 13	at Bishop*	Forester Field; Dallas, TX	L 3–6	
October 20	at Mississippi Valley State	Magnolia Stadium; Itta Bena, MS	L 6–28	
October 27	No. 4 Grambling State	Astrodome; Houston, TX	L 3–32	
November 3	vs. No. 2 Jackson State	Cardinal Stadium; Beaumont, TX	L 7–34	
November 10	Langston*	Rice Stadium; Houston, TX	W 27–20	
November 17	Prairie View A&M	Astrodome; Houston, TX (rivalry)	W 43–8	
*Non-conference game; Rankings from Associated Press Poll released prior to the game
