= 1979 Rhode Island Rams football team =

American college football season

1979 Rhode Island Rams football
- Conference: Yankee Conference
- Record: 1–9–1 (1–4 Yankee)
- Head coach: Bob Griffin (4th season)
- Defensive coordinator: Pete Adrian (4th season)
- Home stadium: Meade Stadium

1979 Yankee Conference football standings
| | Conf. | | | | | Overall |
| Team | W | | L | | T | W | | L | | T |
|---|---|---|---|---|---|---|---|---|---|---|
| No. 7 Boston University + | 4 | – | 1 | – | 0 | 8 | – | 1 | – | 1 |
| UMass + | 4 | – | 1 | – | 0 | 6 | – | 4 | – | 0 |
| Connecticut | 3 | – | 1 | – | 1 | 3 | – | 6 | – | 2 |
| New Hampshire | 2 | – | 2 | – | 1 | 5 | – | 4 | – | 2 |
| Maine | 1 | – | 4 | – | 0 | 1 | – | 9 | – | 1 |
| Rhode Island | 0 | – | 5 | – | 0 | 2 | – | 9 | – | 0 |
+ – Conference co-champions; Rankings from Associated Press poll

The 1979 Rhode Island Rams football team was an American football team that represented the University of Rhode Island in the Yankee Conference during the 1979 NCAA Division I-AA football season. In their fourth season under head coach Bob Griffin, the Rams compiled a 1–9–1 record (1–4 against conference opponents) and finished in fifth place in the conference.

== Schedule ==
| Date | Opponent | Site | Result | Attendance | Source |
|---|---|---|---|---|---|
| September 8 | Delaware* | Meade Stadium; Kingston, RI | L 14–34 | 7,141 | |
| September 15 | at Northeastern* | Parsons Field; Brookline, MA | L 7–17 | 3,567 | |
| September 22 | at Holy Cross* | Fitton Field; Worcester, MA | L 6–35 | 6,121 | |
| September 29 | at Brown* | Brown Stadium; Providence, RI | L 13–31 | 11,250 | |
| October 6 | No. 4 Maine^{†} | Meade Stadium; Kingston, RI | W 10–0 | 8,158 | |
| October 20 | at UMass | Alumni Stadium; Hadley, MA | L 0–24 | 13,500 | |
| October 27 | at No. 6 Boston University | Nickerson Field; Boston, MA | L 0–7 | 5,378 | |
| November 3 | New Hampshire | Meade Stadium; Kingston, RI | L 6–21 | 1,754 | |
| November 10 | Merchant Marine* | Meade Stadium; Kingston, RI | T 24–24 | 1,250 | |
| November 17 | Connecticut | Meade Stadium; Kingston, RI | L 9–10 | 5,938 | |
| December 1 | at Florida A&M* | Bragg Memorial Stadium; Tallahassee, FL | L 6–16 | 8,273 | |
*Non-conference game; ^{†}Homecoming; Rankings from AP Poll released prior to the game
