= 1979 Mississippi Valley State Delta Devils football team =

American college football season

1979 Mississippi Valley State Delta Devils football
- Conference: Southwestern Athletic Conference
- Record: 4–5 (2–4 SWAC)
- Head coach: Jim Thomas (2nd season)
- Defensive coordinator: Ben McGee (2nd season)
- Home stadium: Magnolia Stadium

1979 Southwestern Athletic Conference football standings
	Conf.					Overall
Team	W		L		T	W		L		T
No. 6 Alcorn State +	5	–	1	–	0	8	–	2	–	0
No. 1 Grambling State +	5	–	1	–	0	8	–	3	–	0
No. 8 Jackson State	4	–	2	–	0	8	–	3	–	0
No. T–10 Southern	4	–	2	–	0	7	–	4	–	0
Mississippi Valley State	2	–	4	–	0	4	–	5	–	0
Texas Southern	1	–	5	–	0	3	–	8	–	0
Prairie View A&M	0	–	6	–	0	0	–	11	–	0
+ – Conference co-champions; This conference was a hybrid of NCAA Division I-AA and Division II and programs. Prairie View was classified as Division II. All the other teams were I-AA.; Rankings from Associated Press poll

The 1979 Mississippi Valley State Delta Devils football team represented Mississippi Valley State University as a member of the Southwestern Athletic Conference (SWAC) during the 1979 NCAA Division I-AA football season. Led by second-year head coach Jim Thomas, the Delta Devils compiled an overall record of 4–5, with a conference record of 2–4, and finished fifth in the SWAC.

== Schedule ==
Date	Opponent	Site	Result	Source
September 8	Kentucky State*	Magnolia Stadium; Itta Bena, MS	L 0–3	
September 15	Arkansas–Pine Bluff*	Magnolia Stadium; Itta Bena, MS	W 55–7	
September 22	No. 1 Jackson State	Magnolia Stadium; Itta Bena, MS	L 14–36	
September 29	Southern	Magnolia Stadium; Itta Bena, MS	L 7–20	
October 13	at Grambling State	Grambling Stadium; Grambling, LA	L 13–25	
October 20	Texas Southern	Magnolia Stadium; Itta Bena, MS	W 28–6	
October 27	at Prairie View A&M	Edward L. Blackshear Field; Prairie View, TX	W 22–0	
November 3	at No. T–10 Alcorn State	Henderson Stadium; Lorman, MS	L 3–24	
November 10	at Alabama State*	Cramton Bowl; Montgomery, AL	W 17–0	
*Non-conference game; Rankings from AP Poll released prior to the game
