= 1979 Portland State Vikings football team =

American college football season

1979 Portland State Vikings football
- Conference: Independent
- Record: 6–5
- Head coach: Mouse Davis (5th season)
- Offensive scheme: Run and shoot
- Captains: Robin Pflugrad; Mike Busch
- Home stadium: Civic Stadium

1979 NCAA Division I-AA independents football standings
	Conf.			Overall
Team	W	L	T	W		L		T
No. 4 Lehigh ^		–		10	–	3	–	0
Florida A&M		–		7	–	4	–	0
Portland State		–		6	–	5	–	0
Lafayette		–		5	–	3	–	2
Bucknell		–		4	–	4	–	2
Northwestern State		–		3	–	6	–	0
Northeastern		–		3	–	7	–	0
^ – NCAA Division I-AA playoff participant; Rankings from Associated Press poll

The 1979 Portland State Vikings football team was an American football team that represented Portland State University as an independent during the 1979 NCAA Division I-AA football season. In its fifth season under head coach Mouse Davis, the team compiled a 6–5 record. The team utilized the run and shoot offense popularized by Davis. On the field, the team was led by junior quarterback Neil Lomax. Lomax became the all-time leader in college football history with a career total of 13,200 passing yards.

== Schedule ==
Date	Opponent	Site	Result	Attendance	Source
September 8	Northern Arizona	Civic Stadium; Portland, OR	L 21–22	8,382	
September 22	at Weber State	Stewart Stadium; Ogden, UT	W 16–13	10,037	
September 29	Humboldt State	Civic Stadium; Portland, OR	L 29–30	8,000–8,873	
October 6	Puget Sound	Civic Stadium; Portland, OR	W 72–35	4,484	
October 13	Cal State Northridge	Civic Stadium; Portland, OR	W 34–21	4,052	
October 20	at Northern Colorado	Jackson Field; Greeley, CO	L 20–21	6,283	
October 27	Cal Poly Pomona	Civic Stadium; Portland, OR	L 42–45	4,097	
November 3	at San Francisco State	Cox Stadium; San Francisco, CA	W 37–10	1,000	
November 10	Idaho State	Civic Stadium; Portland, OR	W 44–14	3,872	
November 17	at Montana	Dornblaser Field; Missoula, MT	W 40–32	3,434	
November 23	at United States International	Balboa Stadium; San Diego, CA	L 22–28	1,372	

== Roster ==
1979 Portland State Vikings football team roster
Players
Coaches
Offense

Pos.	#	Name	Class
QB	11	Neil Lomax	Jr
WR	86	Clint Didier	Jr

Defense

Pos.	#	Name	Class

Special teams

Pos.	#	Name	Class

Head coach

- Mouse Davis

Coordinators/assistant coaches

Legend

- (C) Team captain
- (S) Suspended
- (I) Ineligible
- Injured
- Redshirt
