= 1979 Montana State Bobcats football team =

American college football season

1979 Montana State Bobcats football

Big Sky champion
- Conference: Big Sky Conference

Ranking
- AP: No. 9 (I-AA)
- Record: 6–4 (6–1 Big Sky)
- Head coach: Sonny Lubick (2nd season)
- Home stadium: Reno H. Sales Stadium

1979 Big Sky Conference football standings
	Conf.					Overall
Team	W		L		T	W		L		T
Boise State *	7	–	0	–	0	10	–	1	–	0
No. 9 Montana State $	6	–	1	–	0	6	–	4	–	0
No. 5 Nevada ^	5	–	2	–	0	8	–	4	–	0
No. T–10 Northern Arizona	3	–	4	–	0	7	–	4	–	0
Weber State	3	–	4	–	0	3	–	8	–	0
Idaho	2	–	5	–	0	4	–	7	–	0
Montana	2	–	5	–	0	3	–	7	–	0
Idaho State	0	–	7	–	0	0	–	11	–	0
$ – Conference champion; ^ – NCAA Division I-AA playoff participant; * – Boise State was on probation; Rankings from NCAA Division I-AA AP Poll

The 1979 Montana State Bobcats football team represented the Montana State University as a member of the Big Sky Conference during the 1979 NCAA Division I-AA football season. Led by second-year head coach Sonny Lubick, the Bobcats compiled an overall record of 6–4 and a mark of 6–1 in conference play. They were named the Big Sky champion after Boise State was ruled ineligible.

== Schedule ==
Date	Opponent	Rank	Site	Result	Attendance	Source
September 8	North Dakota*		Reno H. Sales Stadium; Bozeman, MT	L 16–20	7,070	
September 15	Fresno State*		Reno H. Sales Stadium; Bozeman, MT	L 20–22	8,143	
September 22	at Idaho State		ASISU Minidome; Pocatello, ID	W 31–14	5,912	
September 29	at Boise State		Bronco Stadium; Boise, ID	L 0–14	20,712	
October 6	Weber State		Reno H. Sales Stadium; Bozeman, MT	W 40–21		
October 13	at No. T–8 Nevada		Mackay Stadium; Reno, NV	W 12–10	9,215	
October 20	at No. 6 Northern Arizona		NAU Skydome; Flagstaff, AZ	W 10–7	9,166	
October 27	Idaho	No. 9	Reno H. Sales Stadium; Bozeman, MT	W 28–20	7,127	
November 3	Montana	No. 8	Reno H. Sales Stadium; Bozeman, MT (rivalry)	W 38–21		
November 10	North Dakota State*	No. 6	Dacotah Field; Fargo, ND	L 7–21	2,250	
*Non-conference game; Rankings from Associated Press Poll released prior to the game

== Roster ==
1979 Montana State Bobcats football team roster
Players
Coaches
Offense

Pos.	#	Name	Class
RB		Tony Boddie	Fr
WR	81	Mike Carle	Fr
WR	8	Mark McGrath	Sr
C		Larry Rubens	So

Defense

Pos.	#	Name	Class
CB	32	Mike McLeod	Sr
SS		Tim Sturdevant	So

Special teams

Pos.	#	Name	Class

Head coach

- Sonny Lubick

Coordinators/assistant coaches

Legend

- (C) Team captain
- (S) Suspended
- (I) Ineligible
- Injured
- Redshirt
