= 1979 Cal State Fullerton Titans football team =

American college football season

1979 Cal State Fullerton Titans football
- Conference: Pacific Coast Athletic Association
- Record: 4–7 (2–3 PCAA)
- Head coach: Jim Colletto (5th season)
- Defensive coordinator: Tom Hayes (1st season)
- Home stadium: Falcon Stadium

1979 Pacific Coast Athletic Association football standings
	Conf.					Overall
Team	W		L		T	W		L		T
Utah State $	5	–	0	–	0	8	–	3	–	0
Long Beach State	3	–	2	–	0	7	–	4	–	0
Fresno State	3	–	2	–	0	5	–	6	–	0
Cal State Fullerton	2	–	3	–	0	4	–	7	–	0
San Jose State	2	–	3	–	0	3	–	8	–	0
Pacific (CA)	0	–	5	–	0	3	–	7	–	0
$ – Conference champion; Records adjusted for San Jose State forfeits

The 1979 Cal State Fullerton Titans football team represented California State University, Fullerton as a member of the Pacific Coast Athletic Association (PCAA) during the 1979 NCAA Division I-A football season. Led by Jim Colletto in his fifth and final season as head coach, Cal State Fullerton finished the season with an overall record of 3–8 and a mark of 1–4 in conference play, placing fifth in the PCAA. The Titans played home games at Falcon Stadium on the campus of Cerritos College in Norwalk, California.

After the season, San Jose State was found to have used an ineligible player in three of their victories and one tie, and had to forfeit those games. One of the forfeited victories was to Cal State Fullerton, which improved the Titan's record to 4–7 overall and 2–3 in conference play, and put the two team info fourth-place tie in the PCAA standings.

== Schedule ==
Date	Opponent	Site	Result	Attendance	Source
September 8	at UNLV*	Las Vegas Silver Bowl; Whitney, NV	L 14–35	21,000	
September 15	Boise State*	Falcon Stadium; Norwalk, CA	L 3–22	3,439	
September 29	at Pacific (CA)	Pacific Memorial Stadium; Stockton, CA	W 17–7	16,400	
October 6	at San Jose State	Spartan Stadium; San Jose, CA	W 0–23 (forfeit win)	10,900	
October 13	at No. 7 Eastern Kentucky*	Hanger Field; Richmond, KY	L 7–33	10,100	
October 20	at Northeast Louisiana*	Malone Stadium; Monroe, LA	L 17–28	15,208	
October 27	at Cal State Northridge*	Devonshire Downs; Northridge, CA	W 49–3	4,500	
November 3	at Utah State	Romney Stadium; Logan, UT	L 7–35	16,600	
November 10	at Fresno State	Ratcliffe Stadium; Fresno, CA	L 24–28	8,357	
November 17	at Idaho State*	ASISU Minidome; Pocatello, ID	W 42–7	3,865	
November 24	Long Beach State	Falcon Stadium; Norwalk, CA	L 13–16	5,250	
*Non-conference game; Rankings from AP (NCAA Division I-AA) Poll released prior to the game

== Roster ==
1979 Cal State Fullerton Titans football team roster
Players
Coaches
Offense

Pos.	#	Name	Class

Defense

Pos.	#	Name	Class
DB		Bobby Kemp	Jr
DB		Lucious Smith	Sr

Special teams

Pos.	#	Name	Class

Head coach

- Jim Colletto

Coordinators/assistant coaches

Legend

- (C) Team captain
- (S) Suspended
- (I) Ineligible
- Injured
- Redshirt

== Team players in the NFL ==
No Cal State Fullerton Titans were selected in the 1980 NFL draft.

The following finished their college career in 1979, were not drafted, but played in the NFL.

Player	Position	First NFL team
Lucious Smith	Defensive back	1980 Los Angeles Rams
