= Walt Nadzak =

American college sports coach (born 1936)

Biographical details
- Born: July 14, 1936 (age 90)
- Education: Denison University (1957)

Playing career

Football
- 1953–1956: Denison

Baseball
- 1954–1957: Denison

Coaching career (HC unless noted)

Football
- 1965–1968: Muskingum (assistant)
- 1969–1976: Juniata
- 1977–1982: Connecticut

Baseball
- 1965–1968: Muskingum

Administrative career (AD unless noted)
- 1969–1977: Juniata
- 1985–2000: The Citadel

Head coaching record
- Overall: 69–65–5 (football)
- Tournaments: Football; 1–1 (NCAA D-III playoffs)

Accomplishments and honors

Championships
- Football; 1 MAC Northern Division (1973); 1 Yankee (1982)

Walter Nadzak Jr. (born July 14, 1936) is an American former college football and college baseball coach and athletics administrator. Nadzak's 35-year career took him to four schools, serving as head baseball coach and assistant football coach at Division III Muskingum, head football coach and athletic director at Juniata, head football coach at then-Division I-AA Connecticut, and finally athletic director at The Citadel.

== Playing career ==
Nadzak played football and baseball at Division III Denison, where he was a four-year letterman in both sports.

After graduation, Nadzak was commissioned in the United States Marine Corps, in which he served for eight years.

== Coaching career ==
=== Juniata ===
Nadzak coached for eight seasons at Juniata, leading the Eagles to the inaugural Division III national championship game.

=== Connecticut ===
Nadzak coached UConn for six seasons, including a pair of Yankee Conference co-championships.

== The Citadel ==
The Southern Conference baseball tournament Most Outstanding Player award is named for Nadzak, in recognition of his time running the event. The tournament took up long time residence in Charleston as a result.

== Head coaching record ==
=== Football ===
Year	Team	Overall	Conference	Standing	Bowl/playoffs
Juniata Indians (Middle Atlantic Conference) (1969–1976)
1969	Juniata	5–3	4–2	3rd (Northern College)	
1970	Juniata	2–6–1	1–6	6th (Northern)	
1971	Juniata	3–4–2	1–4–2	T–4th (Northern)	
1972	Juniata	6–3	5–1	2nd (Northern)	
1973	Juniata	10–2	5–1	1st (Northern)	L NCAA Division III Championship
1974	Juniata	7–2	5–1	2nd (Northern)	
1975	Juniata	6–3	4–2	2nd (Northern)	
1976	Juniata	6–3	3–3	T–3rd (Northern)	
Juniata:		45–26–3	28–20–2		
Connecticut Huskies (Yankee Conference) (1977–1982)
1977	Connecticut	1–10	1–4	T–4th	
1978	Connecticut	4–7	3–2	T–2nd	
1979	Connecticut	3–6–2	3–1–1	3rd	
1980	Connecticut	7–3	3–2	3rd	
1981	Connecticut	4–7	1–4	T–5th	
1982	Connecticut	5–6	3–2	T–1st	
Connecticut:		24–39–2	14–15–1		
Total:		69–65–5			
National championship Conference title Conference division title or championship game berth
