= 1979 Connecticut Huskies football team =

American college football season

1979 Connecticut Huskies football
- Conference: Yankee Conference
- Record: 3–6–2 (3–1–1 Yankee)
- Head coach: Walt Nadzak (3rd season)
- Home stadium: Memorial Stadium

1979 Yankee Conference football standings
| | Conf. | | | | | Overall |
| Team | W | | L | | T | W | | L | | T |
|---|---|---|---|---|---|---|---|---|---|---|
| No. 7 Boston University + | 4 | – | 1 | – | 0 | 8 | – | 1 | – | 1 |
| UMass + | 4 | – | 1 | – | 0 | 6 | – | 4 | – | 0 |
| Connecticut | 3 | – | 1 | – | 1 | 3 | – | 6 | – | 2 |
| New Hampshire | 2 | – | 2 | – | 1 | 5 | – | 4 | – | 2 |
| Maine | 1 | – | 4 | – | 0 | 1 | – | 9 | – | 1 |
| Rhode Island | 0 | – | 5 | – | 0 | 2 | – | 9 | – | 0 |
+ – Conference co-champions; Rankings from Associated Press poll

The 1979 Connecticut Huskies football team represented the University of Connecticut in the 1979 NCAA Division I-AA football season. The Huskies were led by third year-head coach Walt Nadzak, and completed the season with a record of 3–6–2.

== Schedule ==
| Date | Opponent | Site | Result | Attendance | Source |
|---|---|---|---|---|---|
| September 15 | at Army* | Michie Stadium; West Point, NY | L 10–26 | 31,727 | |
| September 22 | at Navy* | Navy–Marine Corps Memorial Stadium; Annapolis, MD | L 10–21 | 22,142 | |
| September 29 | at Yale* | Yale Bowl; New Haven, CT | L 17–24 | 21,300 | |
| October 6 | New Hampshire | Memorial Stadium; Storrs, CT | T 3–3 | 8,004 | |
| October 13 | Rutgers* | Memorial Stadium; Storrs, CT | L 14–26 | 7,762 | |
| October 20 | at Maine | Alumni Field; Orono, ME | W 19–7 | | |
| October 27 | No. 3 UMass | Memorial Stadium; Storrs, CT (rivalry) | W 24–0 | 10,677 | |
| November 3 | at VMI* | Alumni Memorial Stadium; Lexington, VA | T 13–13 | 4,100 | |
| November 10 | at No. 3 Boston University | Nickerson Field; Boston, MA | L 12–16 | | |
| November 17 | at Rhode Island | Meade Stadium; Kingston, RI (rivalry) | W 10–9 | 5,938 | |
| November 24 | Holy Cross* | Memorial Stadium; Storrs, CT | L 12–28 | 5,597 | |
*Non-conference game; Rankings from AP Poll released prior to the game

== Roster ==
1979 Connecticut Huskies football team roster
Players
Coaches
Offense

| Pos. | # | Name | Class |
|---|---|---|---|
| QB | 19 | Alan Arison | So |
| WR | 8 | Reggie Eccleston | Jr |
| QB | 6 | Keith Hugger | Fr |
| OT | 74 | Brian Jones | Jr |
| OT | 75 | Joe Kalinowski | Sr |
| TE | 80 | Ken Miller | Jr |
| TE | 44 | Dave Ragan | Jr |
| QB | 12 | Ken Sweitzer | So |

Defense

| Pos. | # | Name | Class |
|---|---|---|---|
| DT | 97 | Steve Beal | Sr |
| DT | 91 | Steve Michalewicz | Fr |
| DE | 56 | Rich Roth | Jr |
| CB | 28 | Ted Walton | Sr |
| LB | 49 | Jeff Thomas | Jr |

Special teams

| Pos. | # | Name | Class |
|---|---|---|---|
| K | 3 | Bob Segar | Sr |

Head coach

- Walt Nadzak

Coordinators/assistant coaches

Legend

- (C) Team captain
- (S) Suspended
- (I) Ineligible
- Injured
- Redshirt

== After the season ==
=== NFL draft ===
The following Husky was selected in the National Football League draft following the season.

| Round | Pick | Player | Position | NFL club |
|---|---|---|---|---|
| 8 | 221 | Ted Walton | Defensive back | Pittsburgh Steelers |
