= 1979 Idaho State Bengals football team =

American college football season

1979 Idaho State Bengals football
- Conference: Big Sky Conference
- Record: 0–11 (0–7 Big Sky)
- Head coach: Bud Hake (3rd season)
- Home stadium: ASISU Minidome

1979 Big Sky Conference football standings
	Conf.					Overall
Team	W		L		T	W		L		T
Boise State *	7	–	0	–	0	10	–	1	–	0
No. 9 Montana State $	6	–	1	–	0	6	–	4	–	0
No. 5 Nevada ^	5	–	2	–	0	8	–	4	–	0
No. T–10 Northern Arizona	3	–	4	–	0	7	–	4	–	0
Weber State	3	–	4	–	0	3	–	8	–	0
Idaho	2	–	5	–	0	4	–	7	–	0
Montana	2	–	5	–	0	3	–	7	–	0
Idaho State	0	–	7	–	0	0	–	11	–	0
$ – Conference champion; ^ – NCAA Division I-AA playoff participant; * – Boise State was on probation; Rankings from NCAA Division I-AA AP Poll

The 1979 Idaho State Bengals football team represented the Idaho State University in the Big Sky Conference during the 1979 NCAA Division I-AA football season. Led by third-year head coach Bud Hake, the Bengals compiled an overall record of 0–11 (0–7 in Big Sky, last), extending their losing streak to sixteen games, and were winless in conference play for a second straight season. Home games were played at the ASISU Minidome (now Holt Arena), an indoor venue on campus in Pocatello, Idaho.

After the final game of the winless season, Hake resigned with a 5–27 (.156) record in three years. A few days later, he was succeeded by Dave Kragthorpe, the offensive line coach (and assistant head coach) at Brigham Young University.

== Schedule ==
Date	Opponent	Site	Result	Attendance	Source
September 8	at Nevada	Mackay Stadium; Reno, NV	L 7–24	11,766	
September 15	Northern Colorado*	ASISU Minidome; Pocatello, ID	L 0–32		
September 22	Montana State	ASISU Minidome; Pocatello, ID	L 14–31	5,912	
September 29	No. 3 Northern Arizona	ASISU Minidome; Pocatello, ID	L 3–6	5,563	
October 6	Idaho^{†}	ASISU Minidome; Pocatello, ID	L 23–28	8,175	
October 13	at Montana	Dornblaser Field; Missoula, MT	L 24–28	6,626	
October 20	at Boise State	Bronco Stadium; Boise, ID	L 0–44	18,639	
November 3	Weber State	ASISU Minidome; Pocatello, ID	L 10–14		
November 10	at Portland State*	Civic Stadium; Portland, OR	L 14–44	3,872	
November 17	Cal State Fullerton*	ASISU Minidome; Pocatello, ID	L 7–42	3,865	
November 24	at UT Arlington*	Cravens Field; Arlington, TX	L 0–48	2,100	
*Non-conference game; ^{†}Homecoming; Rankings from Associated Press Poll released prior to the game

== Roster ==
1979 Idaho State Bengals football team roster
Players
Coaches
Offense

Pos.	#	Name	Class
FB		Bruce Bachmeier	Sr
HB		Jerry Bird	So
HB		William Brown	Fr
QB		John Dean	Fr
FB		Kevin Humann	Fr
G		Dave Kinnunen	Jr
QB		Dirk Koetter
HB		Eddie McGill
C		George Ripley	Jr
WR		Greg Smith

Defense

Pos.	#	Name	Class
CB		Mike Allison
LB		Gregg Feightner	Jr
NG		Jack Lewis	Jr
DE		Marvin Lewis	Jr
FS		Bob Matsey	Jr
DE		Dave Walser	So
CB		Terry Wilson
DT		Kort Orr	So

Special teams

Pos.	#	Name	Class
PK, P	3	Case deBruijn	So

Head coach

- Bud Hake (3rd year)

Coordinators/assistant coaches

Legend

- (C) Team captain
- (S) Suspended
- (I) Ineligible
- Injured
- Redshirt
