= 1979 Florida A&M Rattlers football team =

American college football season

1979 Florida A&M Rattlers football
- Conference: Independent
- Record: 7–4
- Head coach: Rudy Hubbard (6th season)
- Home stadium: Bragg Memorial Stadium; Doak Campbell Stadium

1979 NCAA Division I-AA independents football standings
	Conf.			Overall
Team	W	L	T	W		L		T
No. 4 Lehigh ^		–		10	–	3	–	0
Florida A&M		–		7	–	4	–	0
Portland State		–		6	–	5	–	0
Lafayette		–		5	–	3	–	2
Bucknell		–		4	–	4	–	2
Northwestern State		–		3	–	6	–	0
Northeastern		–		3	–	7	–	0
^ – NCAA Division I-AA playoff participant; Rankings from Associated Press poll

The 1979 Florida A&M Rattlers football team represented Florida A&M University as an independent during the 1979 NCAA Division I-AA football season. Led by sixth-year head coach Rudy Hubbard, the Rattlers compiled an overall record of 7–4.

== Schedule ==
Date	Opponent	Rank	Site	Result	Attendance	Source
September 15	Albany State		Bragg Memorial Stadium; Tallahassee, FL	W 28–0	15,612	
September 22	vs. No. 3 Grambling State	No. 2	State Fair Stadium; Shreveport, LA	W 25–7	30,000	
September 29	at Howard	No. 1	RFK Stadium; Washington, DC	W 21–13		
October 6	Miami (FL)	No. 1	Doak Campbell Stadium; Tallahassee, FL	W 16–13	34,743	
October 13	vs. Morris Brown	No. 1	Gator Bowl Stadium; Jacksonville, FL	W 55–14	31,000	
October 20	at Tennessee State	No. 1	Dudley Field; Nashville, TN	L 3–20	34,694	
October 27	Tuskegee	No. 2	Bragg Memorial Stadium; Tallahassee, FL	L 14–16		
November 3	at Alabama A&M	No. T–5	Milton Frank Stadium; Huntsville, AL	L 14–19		
November 10	vs. Southern		Miami Orange Bowl; Miami, FL (Orange Blossom Classic)	W 18–6	21,142	
November 24	vs. Bethune–Cookman	No. T–10	Tampa Stadium; Tampa, FL (Florida Classic)	L 20–25	38,706	
December 1	Rhode Island		Bragg Memorial Stadium; Tallahassee, FL	W 16–6	8,273	
Rankings from Associated Press Poll released prior to the game
