= 1979 Grambling State Tigers football team =

American college football season

1979 Grambling State Tigers football

SWAC co-champion
- Conference: Southwestern Athletic Conference
- Record: 8–3 (5–1 SWAC)
- Head coach: Eddie Robinson (37th season)
- Home stadium: Grambling Stadium

1979 Southwestern Athletic Conference football standings
	Conf.					Overall
Team	W		L		T	W		L		T
No. 6 Alcorn State +	5	–	1	–	0	8	–	2	–	0
No. 1 Grambling State +	5	–	1	–	0	8	–	3	–	0
No. 8 Jackson State	4	–	2	–	0	8	–	3	–	0
No. T–10 Southern	4	–	2	–	0	7	–	4	–	0
Mississippi Valley State	2	–	4	–	0	4	–	5	–	0
Texas Southern	1	–	5	–	0	3	–	8	–	0
Prairie View A&M	0	–	6	–	0	0	–	11	–	0
+ – Conference co-champions; This conference was a hybrid of NCAA Division I-AA and Division II and programs. Prairie View was classified as Division II. All the other teams were I-AA.; Rankings from Associated Press poll

The 1979 Grambling State Tigers football team represented Grambling State University was a member of the Southwestern Athletic Conference (SWAC) during the 1979 NCAA Division I-AA football season. Led by 37th-year head coach Eddie Robinson, the Tigers compiled an overall record of 8–3 and a mark of 5–1 in conference play, and finished as SWAC co-champion.

== Schedule ==
Date	Opponent	Rank	Site	Result	Attendance	Source
September 8	vs. Morgan State*		Yankee Stadium; Bronx, NY	W 28–18	38,000–38,164	
September 15	vs. Alcorn State		Mississippi Veterans Memorial Stadium; Jackson, MS	W 40–6		
September 22	vs. No. 2 Florida A&M*	No. 3	State Fair Stadium; Shreveport, LA	L 7–25	30,000	
September 29	Prairie View A&M	No. 6	Grambling Stadium; Grambling, LA (rivalry)	W 61–6		
October 6	at Tennessee State*	No. 5	Hale Stadium; Nashville, TN	L 13–24	16,200	
October 13	Mississippi Valley State		Grambling Stadium; Grambling, LA	W 25–13		
October 20	at No. 2 Jackson State	No. T–8	Mississippi Veterans Memorial Stadium; Jackson, MS	W 25–13	28,128	
October 27	at Texas Southern	No. 4	Houston Astrodome; Houston, TX	W 32–3		
November 3	Alabama State*	No. 1	Grambling Stadium; Grambling, LA	W 21–7		
November 10	at South Carolina State*	No. 1	State College Stadium; Orangeburg, SC	W 22–15	13,097	
December 1	vs. No. T–10 Southern	No. 1	Louisiana Superdome; New Orleans, LA (Bayou Classic)	L 7–14	68,000	
*Non-conference game; Rankings from Associated Press Poll released prior to the game
