= 1979 Boston University Terriers football team =

American college football season

1979 Boston University Terriers football

Yankee Conference co-champion
- Conference: Yankee Conference

Ranking
- AP: No. 7
- Record: 8–1–1 (4–1 Yankee)
- Head coach: Rick Taylor (3rd season)
- Defensive coordinator: Ed Sweeney (2nd season)
- Home stadium: Nickerson Field

1979 Yankee Conference football standings
| | Conf. | | | | | Overall |
| Team | W | | L | | T | W | | L | | T |
|---|---|---|---|---|---|---|---|---|---|---|
| No. 7 Boston University + | 4 | – | 1 | – | 0 | 8 | – | 1 | – | 1 |
| UMass + | 4 | – | 1 | – | 0 | 6 | – | 4 | – | 0 |
| Connecticut | 3 | – | 1 | – | 1 | 3 | – | 6 | – | 2 |
| New Hampshire | 2 | – | 2 | – | 1 | 5 | – | 4 | – | 2 |
| Maine | 1 | – | 4 | – | 0 | 1 | – | 9 | – | 1 |
| Rhode Island | 0 | – | 5 | – | 0 | 2 | – | 9 | – | 0 |
+ – Conference co-champions; Rankings from Associated Press poll

The 1979 Boston University Terriers football team was an American football team that represented Boston University as a member of the Yankee Conference during the 1979 NCAA Division I-AA football season. In their third season under head coach Rick Taylor, the Terriers compiled an 8–1–1 record (4–1 against conference opponents), tied for the conference championship, and outscored opponents by a total of 209 to 120.

== Schedule ==
| Date | Opponent | Rank | Site | Result | Attendance | Source |
|---|---|---|---|---|---|---|
| September 15 | at Maine | | Alumni Field; Orono, ME | W 24–13 | | |
| September 22 | No. 4 New Hampshire | No. 10 | Nickerson Field; Boston, MA | W 41–28 | | |
| September 29 | Northeastern* | No. 4 | Nickerson Field; Boston, MA | W 35–10 | | |
| October 6 | at Harvard* | No. T–3 | Harvard Stadium; Boston, MA | W 14–10 | 12,500 | |
| October 13 | at No. 10 UMass | No. 3 | Alumni Stadium; Hadley, MA | L 6–20 | 10,800 | |
| October 20 | Merchant Marine* | No. 5 | Nickerson Field; Boston, MA | W 30–0 | | |
| October 27 | Rhode Island | No. 6 | Nickerson Field; Boston, MA | W 7–0 | 5,378 | |
| November 3 | at Holy Cross* | No. 3 | Fitton Field; Worcester, MA | W 16–7 | 3,711 | |
| November 10 | Connecticut | No. 3 | Nickerson Field; Boston, MA | W 16–12 | | |
| November 17 | at Bucknell* | No. 2 | Memorial Stadium; Lewisburg, PA | T 20–20 | 4,000 | |
*Non-conference game; Rankings from AP Poll released prior to the game
