= 1979 Utah State Aggies football team =

American college football season

1979 Utah State Aggies football

PCAA champion
- Conference: Pacific Coast Athletic Association
- Record: 8–2–1 (4–0–1 PCAA)
- Head coach: Bruce Snyder (4th season)
- Home stadium: Romney Stadium

1979 Pacific Coast Athletic Association football standings
	Conf.					Overall
Team	W		L		T	W		L		T
Utah State $	5	–	0	–	0	8	–	3	–	0
Long Beach State	3	–	2	–	0	7	–	4	–	0
Fresno State	3	–	2	–	0	5	–	6	–	0
Cal State Fullerton	2	–	3	–	0	4	–	7	–	0
San Jose State	2	–	3	–	0	3	–	8	–	0
Pacific (CA)	0	–	5	–	0	3	–	7	–	0
$ – Conference champion; Records adjusted for San Jose State forfeits

The 1979 Utah State Aggies football team represented Utah State University as a new member of the Pacific Coast Athletic Association (PCAA) during the 1979 NCAA Division I-A football season. The Aggies were led by fourth-year head coach Bruce Snyder and played their home games at Romney Stadium in Logan, Utah. They finished the season with a record of eight wins, two losses and one tie (8–2–1, 4–0–1 PCAA).

== Schedule ==
Date	Opponent	Site	Result	Attendance	Source
September 8	at San Jose State	Spartan Stadium; San Jose, CA	T 48–48	10,782	
September 15	at No. 8 Nebraska*	Memorial Stadium; Lincoln, NE	L 14–35	75,953	
September 22	at Colorado State*	Romney Stadium; Logan, UT	W 24–0	17,960	
September 29	at Utah*	Robert Rice Stadium; Salt Lake City, UT (Battle of the Brothers, Beehive Boot)	W 47–21	31,100	
October 6	Long Beach State	Romney Stadium; Logan, UT	W 51–28	16,046	
October 13	BYU*	Romney Stadium; Logan, UT (rivalry, Beehive Boot)	L 24–48	28,094	
October 20	at Pacific (CA)	Pacific Memorial Stadium; Stockton, CA	W 15–14	18,300	
October 27	at Arizona State*	Sun Devil Stadium; Tempe, AZ	W 14–28 (Arizona State forfeit)	67,219	
November 3	Cal State Fullerton^{†}	Romney Stadium; Logan, UT	W 35–7	16,600	
November 17	at Weber State*	Wildcat Stadium; Ogden, UT	W 34–10	7,707	
November 24	at Fresno State	Ratcliffe Stadium; Fresno, CA	W 41–31	8,957	
*Non-conference game; ^{†}Homecoming; Rankings from AP Poll released prior to the game

== Roster ==
1979 Utah State Aggies football team roster
Players
Coaches
Offense

Pos.	#	Name	Class
QB	18	Craig Bradshaw
QB	10	Eric Hipple	Sr
WR	81	James Murphy	So
RB	24	Rick Parros	Sr

Defense

Pos.	#	Name	Class
DT	80	Rulon Jones	Sr
DT		Mike Perko
S	8	Arthur Thompkins	Sr
LB	59	Brett Ure	Jr

Special teams

Pos.	#	Name	Class

Head coach

- Bruce Snyder

Coordinators/assistant coaches

Legend

- (C) Team captain
- (S) Suspended
- (I) Ineligible
- Injured
- Redshirt
