= 1979 Bucknell Bison football team =

American college football season

1979 Bucknell Bison football
- Conference: Independent
- Record: 4–4–2
- Head coach: Bob Curtis (5th season)
- Captains: John Campana; Mike McDonald
- Home stadium: Memorial Stadium

1979 NCAA Division I-AA independents football standings
| | Conf. | | | Overall |
| Team | W | L | T | W | | L | | T |
|---|---|---|---|---|---|---|---|---|
| No. 4 Lehigh ^ | | – | | 10 | – | 3 | – | 0 |
| Florida A&M | | – | | 7 | – | 4 | – | 0 |
| Portland State | | – | | 6 | – | 5 | – | 0 |
| Lafayette | | – | | 5 | – | 3 | – | 2 |
| Bucknell | | – | | 4 | – | 4 | – | 2 |
| Northwestern State | | – | | 3 | – | 6 | – | 0 |
| Northeastern | | – | | 3 | – | 7 | – | 0 |
^ – NCAA Division I-AA playoff participant; Rankings from Associated Press poll

The 1979 Bucknell Bison football team was an American football team that represented Bucknell University as an independent during the 1979 NCAA Division I-AA football season.

In their fourth year under head coach Bob Curtis, the Bison compiled a 4–4–2 record. John Campana and Mike McDonald were the team captains.

Bucknell played its home games at Memorial Stadium on the university campus in Lewisburg, Pennsylvania.

== Schedule ==
| Date | Opponent | Rank | Site | Result | Attendance | Source |
|---|---|---|---|---|---|---|
| September 8 | Dayton | | Memorial Stadium; Lewisburg, PA | W 17–7 | 4,000 | |
| September 22 | at Rutgers | | Rutgers Stadium; Piscataway, NJ | L 14–16 | 12,300 | |
| September 29 | Davidson | | Memorial Stadium; Lewisburg, PA | W 33–0 | 2,217 | |
| October 6 | at Cornell | No. T–7 | Schoellkopf Field; Ithaca, NY | W 10–0 | 7,500 | |
| October 13 | at No. T–8 Lafayette | No. 6 | Fisher Field; Easton, PA | T 0–0 | 10,700 | |
| October 20 | Gettysburg^ | No. T–8 | Memorial Stadium; Lewisburg, PA | L 7–14 | 6,018 | |
| October 27 | Lehigh^{†} | | Memorial Stadium; Lewisburg, PA | L 13–14 | 8,000 | |
| November 3 | at Northeastern | | Parsons Field; Brookline, MA | W 14–6 | 1,522 | |
| November 10 | at Colgate | | Andy Kerr Stadium; Hamilton, NY | L 2–20 | 5,000 | |
| November 17 | at No. 2 Boston University | | Memorial Stadium; Lewisburg, PA | T 20–20 | 4,000 | |
^{†}Homecoming; ^ Parents Weekend; Rankings from AP Poll released prior to the game
