= Hunt High School =

Location
- 924 20th Street North; Columbus, Mississippi 39701; United States
- Coordinates: 33°30′23″N 88°24′40″W

Information
- Type: Public
- Established: 1952
- Status: Closed
- Closed: 2011
- Grades: 9–12

R. E. Hunt High School was a public secondary school in Columbus, Mississippi, United States. It served as the high school for black students until the public schools were integrated in 1970. After integration, the buildings were used for fifth and sixth graders.

== History ==
In the 1940s, a Mississippi State University study recommended changes to the educational facilities in Columbus to make the concept of "Separate but Equal" a reality. As a result, the city replaced both the white school and the black schools, Union Academy, which served over 1000 students at the time and Mitchell. In 1952, two schools designed by the same architect, Stephen D. Lee High School and R. E. Hunt High School were opened for the students of Columbus. Hunt was named for local African-American educator Dr. Robert E. Hunt, and was the school for black children. Lee was named after confederate general Stephen D. Lee, and was for white children only. In 1971, US Courts mandated the integration of schools and Lee became Lee Middle School serving 7th and 8th grade while Hunt became Hunt Intermediate School, serving 6th grade. Both schools closed in January 2011.

In 1966, three students from Hunt, Diane Hardy, Barbara Turner, and Laverne Greene, became the first black undergraduates in the 82 year history of the Mississippi University for Women. At the same time, three teachers from Hunt, Jacqueline Edwards, Mary L. Flowers, and Eula M. Houser became the first black graduate students at the university.

In 2012, part of the campus was re-opened as the R. E. Hunt Museum & Cultural Center. The museum is housed in the former Fine Arts Building.

In 2018, the Mississippi Department of Archives and History created controversy by declaring Lee High School, the white school, a Historic Landmark, but not granting the same status to Hunt.

In 2025, part of a district restructuring, Hunt was reopened as Hunt Intermediate marking its return as the district's 5th and 6th grade students since 2011.

== Notable alumni ==
- Elbert Drungo, professional football player
- T Thomas, professional football player, coach
