= 1979 San Jose State Spartans football team =

American college football season

1979 San Jose State Spartans football
- Conference: Pacific Coast Athletic Association
- Record: 3–8, 3 wins forfeited, 1 tie forfeited (2–3 PCAA, 2 wins forfeited)
- Head coach: Jack Elway (1st season)
- Offensive coordinator: Dennis Erickson (1st season)
- Home stadium: Spartan Stadium

1979 Pacific Coast Athletic Association football standings
| | Conf. | | | | | Overall |
| Team | W | | L | | T | W | | L | | T |
|---|---|---|---|---|---|---|---|---|---|---|
| Utah State $ | 5 | – | 0 | – | 0 | 8 | – | 3 | – | 0 |
| Long Beach State | 3 | – | 2 | – | 0 | 7 | – | 4 | – | 0 |
| Fresno State | 3 | – | 2 | – | 0 | 5 | – | 6 | – | 0 |
| Cal State Fullerton | 2 | – | 3 | – | 0 | 4 | – | 7 | – | 0 |
| San Jose State | 2 | – | 3 | – | 0 | 3 | – | 8 | – | 0 |
| Pacific (CA) | 0 | – | 5 | – | 0 | 3 | – | 7 | – | 0 |
$ – Conference champion; Records adjusted for San Jose State forfeits

The 1979 San Jose State Spartans football team represented San Jose State University during the 1979 NCAA Division I-A football season as a member of the Pacific Coast Athletic Association. (Note: The Big West Conference was known as the Pacific Coast Athletic Association from its founding in 1969 through 1987.) The team was led by first year head coach Jack Elway. They played home games at Spartan Stadium in San Jose, California.

The Spartans finished the 1979 season as co-champions of the PCAA, with a record of six wins, four losses and one tie (6–4–1, 4–0–1 PCAA). However, in December 1979 the PCAA ruled that the Spartans had used an ineligible player in seven of their games. As a result, the team's co-championship of the conference was vacated, and the record was adjusted to 3–8 (2–3 PCAA).

== Schedule ==
| Date | Opponent | Site | TV | Result | Attendance | Source |
|---|---|---|---|---|---|---|
| September 8 | Utah State | Spartan Stadium; San Jose, CA | | F 48–48 (forfeit) | 10,782 | |
| September 15 | at Stanford* | Stanford Stadium; Stanford, CA (rivalry) | | L 29–45 | 46,789 | |
| September 22 | at California* | California Memorial Stadium; Berkeley, CA | ABC | L 10–13 | 35,000 | |
| September 29 | at Arizona* | Arizona Stadium; Tucson, AZ | | L 18–38 | 48,061 | |
| October 6 | Cal State Fullerton^{†} | Spartan Stadium; San Jose, CA | | F 23–0 (forfeit) | 10,900 | |
| October 13 | at Fresno State | Ratcliffe Stadium; Fresno, CA (rivalry) | | F 35–22 (forfeit) | 11,789 | |
| October 20 | at Oregon State* | Parker Stadium; Corvallis, OR | | F 24–14 (forfeit) | 11,000 | |
| October 27 | at Long Beach State | Anaheim Stadium; Anaheim, CA | | W 53–42 | 6,428 | |
| November 10 | Pacific (CA) | Spartan Stadium; San Jose, CA (Victory Bell) | | W 32–31 | 11,700 | |
| November 16 | Santa Clara* | Spartan Stadium; San Jose, CA | | W 23–14 | 10,936 | |
| November 24 | Central Michigan* | Spartan Stadium; San Jose, CA | | L 32–34 | 10,424 | |
*Non-conference game; ^{†}Homecoming

== Team players in the NFL ==
The following were selected in the 1980 NFL draft.

| Player | Position | Round | Overall | NFL team |
| Jewerl Thomas | Running back | 3 | 58 | Los Angeles Rams |
| Ed Luther | Quarterback | 4 | 101 | San Diego Chargers |

The following finished their San Jose State career in 1979, were not drafted, but played in the NFL.

| Player | Position | First NFL team |
| Derrick Martin | Defensive back | 1987 San Francisco 49ers |
| Eric Hurt | Defensive back | 1980 Dallas Cowboys |
| Jim Walsh | Running back | 1980 Seattle Seahawks |
