= 1979 UMass Minutemen football team =

American college football season

1979 UMass Minutemen football

Yankee Conference co-champion
- Conference: Yankee Conference
- Record: 6–4 (4–1 Yankee)
- Head coach: Bob Pickett (2nd season)
- Defensive coordinator: Jim Reid (2nd season)
- Home stadium: Alumni Stadium

1979 Yankee Conference football standings
	Conf.					Overall
Team	W		L		T	W		L		T
No. 7 Boston University +	4	–	1	–	0	8	–	1	–	1
UMass +	4	–	1	–	0	6	–	4	–	0
Connecticut	3	–	1	–	1	3	–	6	–	2
New Hampshire	2	–	2	–	1	5	–	4	–	2
Maine	1	–	4	–	0	1	–	9	–	1
Rhode Island	0	–	5	–	0	2	–	9	–	0
+ – Conference co-champions; Rankings from Associated Press poll

The 1979 UMass Minutemen football team represented the University of Massachusetts Amherst in the 1979 NCAA Division I-AA football season as a member of the Yankee Conference. The team was coached by Bob Pickett and played its home games at Alumni Stadium in Hadley, Massachusetts. The Minutemen came into the 1979 season on the heels of an appearance in the inaugural I-AA National Championship Game. Despite the high expectations, the team was still able to repeat as Yankee Conference Champions, though they did not earn a postseason berth. UMass finished the season with a record of 6–4 overall and 4–1 in conference play.

== Schedule ==
Date	Opponent	Rank	Site	Result	Attendance	Source
September 15	at Villanova*		Villanova Stadium; Villanova, PA	L 7–35	8,500	
September 22	Maine		Alumni Stadium; Hadley, MA	W 38–14	3,990	
September 29	at Harvard*		Harvard Stadium; Boston, MA	W 20–7	15,000	
October 6	North Carolina Central*		Alumni Stadium; Hadley, MA	W 48–7	7,400	
October 13	at No. 3 Boston University	No. 10	Alumni Stadium; Hadley, MA	W 20–6	10,800	
October 20	Rhode Island	No. 4	Alumni Stadium; Hadley, MA	W 24–0	13,500	
October 27	at Connecticut	No. 3	Memorial Stadium; Storrs, CT (rivalry)	L 0–24	10,677	
November 10	Holy Cross*	No. 9	Alumni Stadium; Hadley, MA	L 18–20	6,300	
November 17	at New Hampshire		Cowell Stadium; Durham, NH (rivalry)	W 29–0	8,750	
November 24	at Boston College*		Alumni Stadium; Chestnut Hill, MA (rivalry)	L 3–41	28,475	
*Non-conference game; Rankings from AP Poll released prior to the game
