= 1979 New Hampshire Wildcats football team =

American college football season

1979 New Hampshire Wildcats football
- Conference: Yankee Conference
- Record: 5–4–2 (2–2–1 Yankee)
- Head coach: Bill Bowes (8th season)
- Home stadium: Cowell Stadium

1979 Yankee Conference football standings
	Conf.					Overall
Team	W		L		T	W		L		T
No. 7 Boston University +	4	–	1	–	0	8	–	1	–	1
UMass +	4	–	1	–	0	6	–	4	–	0
Connecticut	3	–	1	–	1	3	–	6	–	2
New Hampshire	2	–	2	–	1	5	–	4	–	2
Maine	1	–	4	–	0	1	–	9	–	1
Rhode Island	0	–	5	–	0	2	–	9	–	0
+ – Conference co-champions; Rankings from Associated Press poll

The 1979 New Hampshire Wildcats football team was an American football team that represented the University of New Hampshire as a member of the Yankee Conference during the 1979 NCAA Division I-AA football season. In its eighth year under head coach Bill Bowes, the team compiled a 5–4–2 record (2–2–1 against conference opponents) and finished fourth out of six teams in the Yankee Conference.

== Schedule ==
Date	Opponent	Rank	Site	Result	Attendance	Source
September 8	at Wayne State (MI)*		Wayne State Stadium; Detroit, MI	W 24–14		
September 15	Holy Cross*		Cowell Stadium; Durham, NH	W 26–17	12,500	
September 22	at No. 10 Boston University	No. 4	Nickerson Field; Boston, MA	L 28–41		
September 29	Dartmouth*	No. 8	Cowell Stadium; Durham, NH (rivalry)	T 10–10	13,500	
October 6	at Connecticut		Memorial Stadium; Storrs, CT	T 3–3	8,004	
October 13	at Maine		Alumni Field; Orono, ME (rivalry)	W 23–0	7,000	
October 20	Lehigh*		Cowell Stadium; Durham, NH	L 3–16	15,400	
October 27	Northeastern*		Cowell Stadium; Durham, NH	W 20–8		
November 3	at Rhode Island		Meade Stadium; Kingston, RI	W 21–6		
November 10	at Springfield*	No. T–10	Benedum Field; Springfield, MA	L 14–34		
November 17	UMass		Cowell Stadium; Durham, NH (rivalry)	L 0–29	8,750	
*Non-conference game; Rankings from AP Poll released prior to the game

== Roster ==
1979 New Hampshire Wildcats football team roster
Players
Coaches
Offense

Pos.	#	Name	Class
OT		Ken Kaplan	So

Defense

Pos.	#	Name	Class
LB		Steve Doig	So
LB		Chris Kosinski	Jr

Special teams

Pos.	#	Name	Class

Head coach

- Bill Bowes

Coordinators/assistant coaches

Legend

- (C) Team captain
- (S) Suspended
- (I) Ineligible
- Injured
- Redshirt
