= 1979 Pacific Tigers football team =

American college football season

1979 Pacific Tigers football
- Conference: Pacific Coast Athletic Association
- Record: 3–7 (0–5 PCAA)
- Head coach: Bob Toledo (1st season)
- Home stadium: Pacific Memorial Stadium

1979 Pacific Coast Athletic Association football standings
| | Conf. | | | | | Overall |
| Team | W | | L | | T | W | | L | | T |
|---|---|---|---|---|---|---|---|---|---|---|
| Utah State $ | 5 | – | 0 | – | 0 | 8 | – | 3 | – | 0 |
| Long Beach State | 3 | – | 2 | – | 0 | 7 | – | 4 | – | 0 |
| Fresno State | 3 | – | 2 | – | 0 | 5 | – | 6 | – | 0 |
| Cal State Fullerton | 2 | – | 3 | – | 0 | 4 | – | 7 | – | 0 |
| San Jose State | 2 | – | 3 | – | 0 | 3 | – | 8 | – | 0 |
| Pacific (CA) | 0 | – | 5 | – | 0 | 3 | – | 7 | – | 0 |
$ – Conference champion; Records adjusted for San Jose State forfeits

The 1979 Pacific Tigers football team represented the University of the Pacific (UOP) in the 1979 NCAA Division I-A football season as a member of the Pacific Coast Athletic Association. (Note: The Big West Conference was known as the Pacific Coast Athletic Association from its founding in 1969 through 1987.)

The team was led by head coach Bob Toledo, in his first year, and played their home games at Pacific Memorial Stadium (Note: Amos Alonzo Stagg Memorial Stadium was known as Pacific Memorial Stadium from its opening in 1950 through 1987.) in Stockton, California. They finished the season with a record of three wins and seven losses (3–7, 0–5 PCAA). The Tigers were outscored by their opponents 162–193 over the season.

== Schedule ==
| Date | Opponent | Site | Result | Attendance | Source |
|---|---|---|---|---|---|
| September 8 | at UTEP* | Sun Bowl; El Paso, TX | L 7–31 | 23,400 | |
| September 15 | Cal Poly* | Pacific Memorial Stadium; Stockton, CA | W 31–17 | 17,600–19,385 | |
| September 22 | at Idaho* | Kibbie Dome; Moscow, ID | L 13–17 | | |
| September 29 | Cal State Fullerton | Pacific Memorial Stadium; Stockton, CA | L 7–17 | 16,400 | |
| October 6 | at Iowa State* | Cyclone Stadium; Ames, IA | W 24–7 | 47,600 | |
| October 13 | at Southwestern Louisiana* | Cajun Field; Lafayette, LA | W 10–7 | | |
| October 20 | Utah State | Pacific Memorial Stadium; Stockton, CA | L 14–15 | 18,300 | |
| October 27 | Fresno State^{†} | Pacific Memorial Stadium; Stockton, CA | L 10–33 | 25,300 | |
| November 3 | at Long Beach State | Anaheim Stadium; Anaheim, CA | L 15–17 | 5,733 | |
| November 10 | at San Jose State | Spartan Stadium; San Jose, CA (Victory Bell) | L 31–32 | 11,700 | |
*Non-conference game; ^{†}Homecoming

== Roster ==
1979 Pacific Tigers football team roster
Players
Coaches
Offense

| Pos. | # | Name | Class |
|---|---|---|---|
| QB | 1 | Gregory Jiles | Jr |
| C | 78 | Andy Lewandowski | So |

Defense

| Pos. | # | Name | Class |
|---|---|---|---|
| DT | 79 | Al Johns | Sr |
| DT | 72 | Mark Johnson | Sr |
| LB | 57 | Mike Merriweather | So |

Special teams

| Pos. | # | Name | Class |

Head coach

- Bob Toledo

Coordinators/assistant coaches

Legend

- (C) Team captain
- (S) Suspended
- (I) Ineligible
- Injured
- Redshirt

== Team players in the NFL ==
The following UOP players were selected in the 1980 NFL draft.

| Player | Position | Round | Overall | NFL team |
| Brad Vassar | Linebacker | 5 | 117 | Atlanta Falcons |
| Jack Cosgrove | Center | 8 | 207 | Seattle Seahawks |
| Mike House | Tight end | 8 | 208 | New England Patriots |

The following finished their college career in 1979, were not drafted, but played in the NFL.

| Player | Position | First NFL team |
| Kevin Turner | Linebacker | 1980 New York Giants |
| Mike Whited | Tackle | 1980 Detroit Lions |
