= Bud Hake =

American football player and coach (1927–1994)

Biographical details
- Born: July 11, 1927; Yakima, Washington, U.S.
- Died: March 23, 1994 (aged 66); Montesano, Washington, U.S.

Playing career
- 1946–1949: Central Washington
- Position: Tackle

Coaching career (HC unless noted)
- 1951–1957: Goldendale HS (WA)
- 1958–1966: Mount Vernon HS (WA)
- 1967–1976: Grays Harbor
- 1977–1979: Idaho State

Head coaching record
- Overall: 5–28 (college); 67–27 (junior college)

Accomplishments and honors

Championships
- 1 NWCCC (1969); 4 NWCCC Western Division (1969–1972)

Leo Gale "Bud" Hake (July 11, 1927 – March 23, 1994) was an American college football coach, the head coach at Idaho State University in Pocatello from 1977 to 1979, compiling a record of 5–28 (.152). Previously, he had been a head coach in Washington at Grays Harbor College, in Aberdeen, from 1967 to 1976, and at two high schools: Mount Vernon, from 1958 to 1966, and Goldendale, from 1951 to 1957.

Hake died at age 66 of amyotrophic lateral sclerosis (ALS) in 1994, and was buried in Aberdeen.

== Head coaching record ==
=== College ===
Year	Team	Overall	Conference	Standing	Bowl/playoffs
Idaho State Bengals (Big Sky Conference) (1977–1979)
1977	Idaho State	3–8	2–4	T–4th	
1978	Idaho State	2–9	0–6	7th	
1979	Idaho State	0–11	0–7	8th	
Idaho State:		5–28	2–17		
Total:		5–28			

=== Junior college ===
Year	Team	Overall	Conference	Standing	Bowl/playoffs
Grays Harbor Chokers (Washington / Northwest Community College Conference) (1967–1976)
1967	Grays Harbor	7–2	5–2	2nd	
1968	Grays Harbor	5–4	4–3	3rd	
1969	Grays Harbor	8–2	5–1	1st (Western)	
1970	Grays Harbor	8–2	7–1	1st (Western)	
1971	Grays Harbor	8–2	7–1	1st (Western)	
1972	Grays Harbor	7–3	6–2	1st (Western)	
1973	Grays Harbor	6–3	5–3	3rd (Western)	
1974	Grays Harbor	6–3	6–2	2nd (Western)	
1975	Grays Harbor	7–2	6–2	2nd (Western)	
1976	Grays Harbor	5–4	5–4	T–2nd (Western)	
Grays Harbor:		67–27	56–21		
Total:		67–27			
National championship Conference title Conference division title or championship game berth
