= 1979 Prairie View A&M Panthers football team =

American college football season

1979 Prairie View A&M Panthers football
- Conference: Southwestern Athletic Conference
- Record: 0–11 (0–6 SWAC)
- Head coach: Hoover J. Wright (10th season)
- Home stadium: Edward L. Blackshear Field

1979 Southwestern Athletic Conference football standings
	Conf.					Overall
Team	W		L		T	W		L		T
No. 6 Alcorn State +	5	–	1	–	0	8	–	2	–	0
No. 1 Grambling State +	5	–	1	–	0	8	–	3	–	0
No. 8 Jackson State	4	–	2	–	0	8	–	3	–	0
No. T–10 Southern	4	–	2	–	0	7	–	4	–	0
Mississippi Valley State	2	–	4	–	0	4	–	5	–	0
Texas Southern	1	–	5	–	0	3	–	8	–	0
Prairie View A&M	0	–	6	–	0	0	–	11	–	0
+ – Conference co-champions; This conference was a hybrid of NCAA Division I-AA and Division II and programs. Prairie View was classified as Division II. All the other teams were I-AA.; Rankings from Associated Press poll

The 1979 Prairie View A&M Panthers football team represented Prairie View A&M University as a member of the Southwestern Athletic Conference (SWAC) during the 1979 NCAA Division II football season. Led by tenth-year head coach Hoover J. Wright, the Panthers compiled an overall record of 0–11, with a conference record of 0–6, and finished seventh in the SWAC.

== Schedule ==
Date	Opponent	Site	Result	Attendance	Source
September 1	vs. Southwest Texas State*	Alamo Stadium; San Antonio, TX	L 13–38	6,000	
September 15	Jackson State	Edward L. Blackshear Field; Prairie View, TX	L 6–24		
September 22	vs. Southern	Houston, TX	L 0–44		
September 29	at No. 6 Grambling State	Grambling Stadium; Grambling, LA (rivalry)	L 6–61		
October 6	vs. Bishop*	P.C. Cobb Stadium; Dallas, TX	L 16–33		
October 13	at Texas Lutheran*	Matador Stadium; Seguin, TX	L 21–30		
October 20	at Hawaii*	Aloha Stadium; Halawa, HI	L 0–65	28,839	
October 27	Mississippi Valley State	Edward L. Blackshear Field; Prairie View, TX	L 0–22		
November 3	at Arkansas–Pine Bluff*	Pumphrey Stadium; Pine Bluff, AR	L 0–37		
November 10	at No. 8 Alcorn State	Henderson Stadium; Lorman, MS	L 0–19		
November 17	at Texas Southern	Astrodome; Houston, TX (rivalry)	L 8–43		
*Non-conference game; Rankings from AP Poll released prior to the game
