= 1979 Fresno State Bulldogs football team =

American college football season

1979 Fresno State Bulldogs football
- Conference: Pacific Coast Athletic Association
- Record: 5–6 (3–2 PCAA)
- Head coach: Bob Padilla (2nd season)
- Home stadium: Ratcliffe Stadium

1979 Pacific Coast Athletic Association football standings
	Conf.					Overall
Team	W		L		T	W		L		T
Utah State $	5	–	0	–	0	8	–	3	–	0
Long Beach State	3	–	2	–	0	7	–	4	–	0
Fresno State	3	–	2	–	0	5	–	6	–	0
Cal State Fullerton	2	–	3	–	0	4	–	7	–	0
San Jose State	2	–	3	–	0	3	–	8	–	0
Pacific (CA)	0	–	5	–	0	3	–	7	–	0
$ – Conference champion; Records adjusted for San Jose State forfeits

The 1979 Fresno State Bulldogs football team represented California State University, Fresno as a member of the Pacific Coast Athletic Association (PCAA) during the 1979 NCAA Division I-A football season. Led by Bob Padilla in his second and final season as head coach, Fresno State compiled an overall record of 4–7 with a mark of 2–3 in conference play, placing fourth in the PCAA. While Fresno State lost to San Jose State, the game was subsequently forfeited by the Spartans due to the use of an ineligible player. As a result, Fresno State's record was adjusted to 5–6 overall and 3–2 in conference play, moving them into a tie for second place in the PCAA.

The Bulldogs played their home games at Ratcliffe Stadium on the campus of Fresno City College in Fresno, California.

== Schedule ==
Date	Opponent	Site	Result	Attendance	Source
September 8	Idaho*	Ratcliffe Stadium; Fresno, CA	W 30–10	11,148	
September 15	at Montana State*	Reno H. Sales Stadium; Bozeman, MT	W 22–20	8,143	
September 22	San Diego State*	Ratcliffe Stadium; Fresno, CA (rivalry)	L 23–32	15,235	
September 29	at No. 9 Washington*	Husky Stadium; Seattle, WA	L 14–49	42,459	
October 6	at Cal Poly*	Mustang Stadium; San Luis Obispo, CA	L 0–26	8,680	
October 13	San Jose State	Ratcliffe Stadium; Fresno, CA (rivalry)	W 22–35 (forfeit win)	11,789	
October 20	at Long Beach State	Anaheim Stadium; Anaheim, CA	L 14–24	5,844	
October 27	at Pacific (CA)	Pacific Memorial Stadium; Stockton, CA	W 33–10	25,300	
November 3	UNLV*	Ratcliffe Stadium; Fresno, CA	L 28–31	8,143	
November 10	Cal State Fullerton	Ratcliffe Stadium; Fresno, CA	W 28–24	8,357	
November 24	Utah State	Ratcliffe Stadium; Fresno, CA	L 31–41	9,092	
*Non-conference game; Rankings from AP Poll released prior to the game

== Team players in the NFL ==
No Fresno State players were drafted in the 1980 NFL draft.

The following finished their college career in 1979, were not drafted, but played in the NFL.

Player	Position	First NFL Team
Gary Hayes	Defensive back	1984 Green Bay Packers
