= 1979 Southern Jaguars football team =

American college football season

1979 Southern Jaguars football
- Conference: Southwestern Athletic Conference
- Record: 7–4 (4–2 SWAC)
- Head coach: Cass Jackson (2nd season)
- Home stadium: University Stadium

1979 Southwestern Athletic Conference football standings
	Conf.					Overall
Team	W		L		T	W		L		T
No. 6 Alcorn State +	5	–	1	–	0	8	–	2	–	0
No. 1 Grambling State +	5	–	1	–	0	8	–	3	–	0
No. 8 Jackson State	4	–	2	–	0	8	–	3	–	0
No. T–10 Southern	4	–	2	–	0	7	–	4	–	0
Mississippi Valley State	2	–	4	–	0	4	–	5	–	0
Texas Southern	1	–	5	–	0	3	–	8	–	0
Prairie View A&M	0	–	6	–	0	0	–	11	–	0
+ – Conference co-champions; This conference was a hybrid of NCAA Division I-AA and Division II and programs. Prairie View was classified as Division II. All the other teams were I-AA.; Rankings from Associated Press poll

The 1979 Southern Jaguars football team represented Southern University as a member of the Southwestern Athletic Conference (SWAC) during the 1979 NCAA Division I-AA football season. Led by second-year head coach Cass Jackson, the Jaguars compiled an overall record of 7–4, with a conference record of 4–2, and finished tied for third in the SWAC.

== Schedule ==
Date	Opponent	Rank	Site	Result	Attendance	Source
September 8	Tuskegee*		University Stadium; Baton Rouge, LA	W 22–2		
September 15	Texas Southern		University Stadium; Baton Rouge, LA	W 21–0		
September 22	at Prairie View A&M		Rice Stadium; Houston, TX	W 44–0		
September 29	at Mississippi Valley State		Magnolia Stadium; Itta Bena, MS	W 20–7		
October 6	Alabama State*		University Stadium; Baton Rouge, LA	W 28–6		
October 13	at No. 2 Jackson State	No. 5	Mississippi Veterans Memorial Stadium; Jackson, MS (rivalry)	L 0–34		
October 20	Alcorn State	No. 7	University Stadium; Baton Rouge, LA	L 12–17		
October 27	Tennessee State*		University Stadium; Baton Rouge, LA	L 6–17	20,437	
November 3	at Howard*		Howard Stadium; Washington, DC	W 30–0		
November 10	vs. Florida A&M*		Miami Orange Bowl; Miami, FL (Orange Blossom Classic)	L 30–0	21,142	
December 1	vs. No. 1 Grambling State	No. T–10	Louisiana Superdome; New Orleans, LA (Bayou Classic)	W 14–7	68,000	
*Non-conference game; Rankings from AP Poll released prior to the game
