= 1979 Boise State Broncos football team =

American college football season

1979 Boise State Broncos football
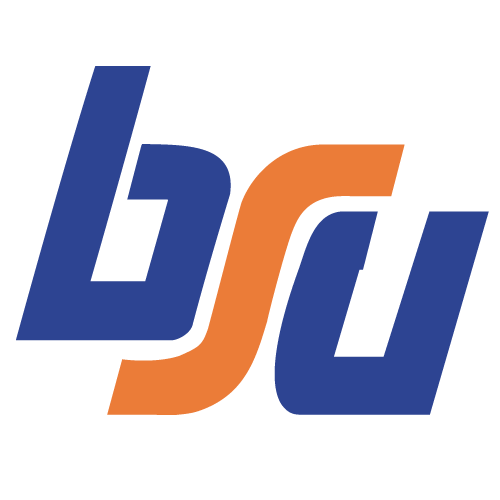
- Conference: Big Sky Conference
- Record: 10–1 (7–0 Big Sky)
- Head coach: Jim Criner (4th season)
- Offensive coordinator: Gene Dahlquist (3rd season)
- Defensive coordinator: Chuck Banker (1st season)
- Base defense: 3–4
- Home stadium: Bronco Stadium

1979 Big Sky Conference football standings
	Conf.					Overall
Team	W		L		T	W		L		T
Boise State *	7	–	0	–	0	10	–	1	–	0
No. 9 Montana State $	6	–	1	–	0	6	–	4	–	0
No. 5 Nevada ^	5	–	2	–	0	8	–	4	–	0
No. T–10 Northern Arizona	3	–	4	–	0	7	–	4	–	0
Weber State	3	–	4	–	0	3	–	8	–	0
Idaho	2	–	5	–	0	4	–	7	–	0
Montana	2	–	5	–	0	3	–	7	–	0
Idaho State	0	–	7	–	0	0	–	11	–	0
$ – Conference champion; ^ – NCAA Division I-AA playoff participant; * – Boise State was on probation; Rankings from NCAA Division I-AA AP Poll

The 1979 Boise State Broncos football team represented Boise State University in the 1979 NCAA Division I-AA football season. The Broncos competed in the Big Sky Conference and played their home games on campus at Bronco Stadium in Boise, Idaho. They were led by fourth-year head coach Jim Criner and an offensive backfield of juniors: quarterback Joe Aliotti, fullback David Hughes, halfback Cedric Minter, with halfback Terry Zahner in reserve.

The Broncos were 10–1 and undefeated in the Big Sky, but were on probation for a scouting violation in November 1978; they were ineligible for the league title or I-AA playoffs in 1979 and were not allowed to scouting films of upcoming opponents.

Senior quarterback Hoskin Hogan dropped out of school and junior college transfer Aliotti won the starting job.

After an opening two-point loss at home, BSU won ten straight; the league opener in late September set a Big Sky attendance record at 20,712. A 14–0 shutout win for BSU, it was the only blemish for Montana State (6–1) in conference play, but three non-conference losses kept them out of the four-team I-AA playoffs; the western postseason bid went again to fifth-ranked Nevada-Reno (8–3), who finished their first season in the Big Sky at 5–2.

== Schedule ==
Date	Time	Opponent	Site	Result	Attendance	Source
September 8	7:30 pm	Long Beach State*	Bronco Stadium; Boise, ID	L 7–9	19,579	
September 15	7:30 pm	at Cal State Fullerton*	Falcon Stadium; Norwalk, CA	W 22–3	3,439	
September 22	7:30 pm	Akron*	Bronco Stadium; Boise, ID	W 31–21	19,642	
September 29	7:30 pm	Montana State	Bronco Stadium; Boise, ID	W 14–0	20,712	
October 6		at Montana	Dornblaser Field; Missoula, MT	W 37–35	6,129	
October 13	8:30 pm	at Idaho	Kibbie Dome; Moscow, ID (rivalry)	W 41–17	15,500	
October 20	7:30 pm	Idaho State	Bronco Stadium; Boise, ID	W 44–0	18,639	
October 27	1:30 pm	at Weber State	Wildcat Stadium; Ogden, UT	W 23–7	6,110	
November 3	1:30 pm	Northern Arizona^{†}	Bronco Stadium; Boise, ID	W 44–7	20,686	
November 10	1:30 pm	at No. 10 Nevada	Mackay Stadium; Reno, NV (rivalry)	W 28–27	14,256	
November 17	1:00 pm	No. 7 (D-II) Cal Poly*	Bronco Stadium; Boise, ID	W 56–14	17,257	
*Non-conference game; ^{†}Homecoming; Rankings from AP Poll released prior to the game; All times are in Mountain time

== Roster ==
1979 Boise State Broncos football team roster
Players
Coaches
Offense

Pos.	#	Name	Class
QB	7	Kevin McDonald	Jr
QB	14	Joe Aliotti	Jr
QB	15	Dave DeMers	Fr
TB	20	Cedric Minter	Jr
FL	21	Mike Brady	Sr
TB	27	Terry Zahner	Jr
FB	33	David Hughes	Jr
C	55	Randy Schrader	Jr
RT	60	Dennis Brady	So
LT	67	Bob Markovich	Sr
RG	68	Bill Roberds	Sr
LG	69	Shawn Beaton	Jr
LT	76	Renny Buckner	Sr
SE	80	Kipp Bedard	So
TE	84	Jim Balch	Sr
FL	89	Ron Harvey	Fr
TE	90	Duane Dlouhy	So

Defense

Pos.	#	Name	Class
RCB	8	Randy Stewart	Sr
FS	23	Curt Chandler	Sr
LCB	28	Chris Bell	So
SS	29	Rick Woods	So
LOLB	57	Ralph Esposito	Jr
ROLB	48	Ron Chatterton	Jr
LILB	61	Ray Santucci	So
RILB	58	Dan Williams	Jr
LDT	70	Randy Trautman	So
RDT	75	Doug Scott	Sr
NG	88	Willie Tufono	Sr

Special teams

Pos.	#	Name	Class
K	10	Kenrick Camerud	Fr
PR	21	Mike Brady	Sr
P	33	Tom Spadafore	Jr
KR	35	Greg Ward	So

Head coach

- Jim Criner (4th year)

Coordinators/assistant coaches

- Gene Dahlquist (OC)
- Chuck Banker (DC, LB)
- Dave Campo (DB)
- Dave Wasick (DL)

Legend

- (C) Team captain
- (S) Suspended
- (I) Ineligible
- Injured
- Redshirt

== All-conference ==
Halfback Cedric Minter was a repeat selection to the all-conference team, joined by quarterback Joe Aliotti, wide receiver Kipp Bedard, guard Shawn Beaton, defensive tackle Doug Scott, linebacker Ralph Esposito, and safety Rick Woods. Second team selections were fullback David Hughes, halfback Terry Zahner, wide receiver Mike Brady, defensive tackle Randy Trautman, nose guard Willie Tufono, linebacker Dan Williams, and cornerback Chris Bell.
