= 1979 Nevada Wolf Pack football team =

American college football season

1979 Nevada Wolf Pack football

NCAA Division I-AA Semifinal, L 30–33^{2OT} vs. Eastern Kentucky
- Conference: Big Sky Conference
- Record: 8–4 (5–2 Big Sky)
- Head coach: Chris Ault (4th season)
- Defensive coordinator: John L. Smith (3rd season)
- Home stadium: Mackay Stadium

1979 Big Sky Conference football standings
	Conf.					Overall
Team	W		L		T	W		L		T
Boise State *	7	–	0	–	0	10	–	1	–	0
No. 9 Montana State $	6	–	1	–	0	6	–	4	–	0
No. 5 Nevada ^	5	–	2	–	0	8	–	4	–	0
No. T–10 Northern Arizona	3	–	4	–	0	7	–	4	–	0
Weber State	3	–	4	–	0	3	–	8	–	0
Idaho	2	–	5	–	0	4	–	7	–	0
Montana	2	–	5	–	0	3	–	7	–	0
Idaho State	0	–	7	–	0	0	–	11	–	0
$ – Conference champion; ^ – NCAA Division I-AA playoff participant; * – Boise State was on probation; Rankings from NCAA Division I-AA AP Poll

The 1979 Nevada Wolf Pack football team represented the University of Nevada, Reno as a member of the Big Sky Conference during the 1979 NCAA Division I-AA football season. Led by fourth-year head coach Chris Ault, the Wolf Pack compiled an overall record of 8–4 with a mark of 5–2 in conference play, placing third in the Big Sky. Nevada advanced to the NCAA Division I-AA Football Championship playoffs, where the Wolf Pack lost in the semifinals to the eventual national champion, Eastern Kentucky. The team played home games at Mackay Stadium in Reno, Nevada.

== Schedule ==
Date	Opponent	Rank	Site	Result	Attendance	Source
September 8	Idaho State		Mackay Stadium; Reno, NV	W 24–6	11,766	
September 15	UNLV*		Mackay Stadium; Reno, NV (Fremont Cannon)	L 21–26	12,751	
September 22	at UC Davis*	No. T–10	Toomey Field; Davis, CA	W 28–21		
October 6	Simon Fraser*	No. 10	Mackay Stadium; Reno, NV	W 35–10	9,425	
October 13	Montana State	No. T–8	Mackay Stadium; Reno, NV	L 10–12	9,215	
October 20	Weber State^{†}		Wildcat Stadium; Ogden, UT	W 22–3	9,362	
October 27	at Montana		Dornblaser Field; Missoula, MT	W 27–20	5,163	
November 3	at Idaho		Kibbie Dome; Moscow, ID	W 38–26	5,500	
November 10	Boise State	No. T–10	Mackay Stadium; Reno, NV (rivalry)	L 27–28	14,256	
November 17	Missouri Southern*	No. 8	Mackay Stadium; Reno, NV	W 32–6	7,020	
November 24	at No. T–7 Northern Arizona	No. T–7	NAU Skydome; Flagstaff, AZ	W 31–7		
December 8	at No. 3 Eastern Kentucky*	No. 5	Hanger Field; Richmond, KY (NCAA Division I-AA Semifinal)	L 30–33 ^{2OT}	5,100	
*Non-conference game; ^{†}Homecoming; Rankings from Associated Press Poll released prior to the game

== Roster ==
1979 Nevada Wolf Pack football team roster
Players
Coaches
Offense

Pos.	#	Name	Class
QB	12	Larry Wortman	Sr
RB	27	Frank Hawkins	Jr
OL	78	Eric Sanders	Jr

Defense

Pos.	#	Name	Class
DT	77	Don Smerek	Sr
DE	83	Charles Mann	Fr

Special teams

Pos.	#	Name	Class

Head coach

- Chris Ault

Coordinators/assistant coaches

Legend

- (C) Team captain
- (S) Suspended
- (I) Ineligible
- Injured
- Redshirt
