= 1979 Lehigh Engineers football team =

American college football season

1979 Lehigh Engineers football

NCAA Division I-AA Championship Game, L 7–30 vs Eastern Kentucky
- Conference: Independent

Ranking
- AP: No. 4
- Record: 10–3
- Head coach: John Whitehead (4th season)
- Captains: Rich Andres; Jim McCormick; Eric Yaszemski
- Home stadium: Taylor Stadium

1979 NCAA Division I-AA independents football standings
	Conf.			Overall
Team	W	L	T	W		L		T
No. 4 Lehigh ^		–		10	–	3	–	0
Florida A&M		–		7	–	4	–	0
Portland State		–		6	–	5	–	0
Lafayette		–		5	–	3	–	2
Bucknell		–		4	–	4	–	2
Northwestern State		–		3	–	6	–	0
Northeastern		–		3	–	7	–	0
^ – NCAA Division I-AA playoff participant; Rankings from Associated Press poll

The 1979 Lehigh Engineers football team was an American football team that represented Lehigh University as an independent during the 1979 NCAA Division I-AA football season. The Engineers finished the year ranked No. 3 in Division I-AA and qualified for the four-team national playoff. They won their semifinal but lost the 1979 NCAA Division I-AA Football Championship Game.

In their fourth year under head coach John Whitehead, the Engineers compiled a 10–3 record (9–2 in the regular season). Rich Andres, Jim McCormick and Eric Yaszemski were the team captains.

Lehigh returned to the national championship two years after winning the NCAA Division II Football Championship and the Lambert Cup in 1977. Its two regular season losses in 1979 were away games at Colgate, a Division I-A team, and at Delaware, the eventual Division II champion.

Lehigh played its home games at Taylor Stadium on the university's main campus in Bethlehem, Pennsylvania.

== Schedule ==
Date	Opponent	Rank	Site	Result	Attendance	Source
September 8	at West Chester		John A. Farrell Stadium; West Chester, PA	W 12–7	5,500	
September 15	Slippery Rock		Taylor Stadium; Bethlehem, PA	W 44–9		
September 22	at Colgate	No. 9	Andy Kerr Stadium; Hamilton, NY	L 3–10	7,200	
September 29	Penn		Taylor Stadium; Bethlehem, PA	W 31–7	10,500	
October 6	at No. 2 (D-II) Delaware		Delaware Stadium; Newark, DE (rivalry)	L 14–21	20,636	
October 13	Davidson		Taylor Stadium; Bethlehem, PA	W 10–0	11,500	
October 20	at New Hampshire		Cowell Stadium; Durham, NH	W 16–3	15,400	
October 27	at Bucknell	No. 10	Memorial Stadium; Lewisburg, PA	W 14–13	8,000	
November 3	C.W. Post	No. 7	Taylor Stadium; Bethlehem, PA	W 17–0	10,000	
November 10	at Maine	No. 7	Taylor Stadium; Bethlehem, PA	W 12–6	5,000	
November 17	Lafayette	No. 6	Taylor Stadium; Bethlehem, PA (The Rivalry)	W 24–3	19,000	
December 8	at No. 2 Murray State	No. 4	Roy Stewart Stadium; Murray, KY (NCAA Division I-AA Semifinal)	W 28–9	10,000	
December 15	vs. No. 3 Eastern Kentucky	No. 4	Orlando Stadium; Orlando, FL (NCAA Division I-AA Championship Game)	L 7–30	5,200	
^ Parents Day; Rankings from AP Poll released prior to the game
