= 1979 Jackson State Tigers football team =

American college football season

1979 Jackson State Tigers football
- Conference: Southwestern Athletic Conference
- Record: 8–3 (4–2 SWAC)
- Head coach: W. C. Gorden (4th season)
- Home stadium: Mississippi Veterans Memorial Stadium

1979 Southwestern Athletic Conference football standings
| | Conf. | | | | | Overall |
| Team | W | | L | | T | W | | L | | T |
|---|---|---|---|---|---|---|---|---|---|---|
| No. 6 Alcorn State + | 5 | – | 1 | – | 0 | 8 | – | 2 | – | 0 |
| No. 1 Grambling State + | 5 | – | 1 | – | 0 | 8 | – | 3 | – | 0 |
| No. 8 Jackson State | 4 | – | 2 | – | 0 | 8 | – | 3 | – | 0 |
| No. T–10 Southern | 4 | – | 2 | – | 0 | 7 | – | 4 | – | 0 |
| Mississippi Valley State | 2 | – | 4 | – | 0 | 4 | – | 5 | – | 0 |
| Texas Southern | 1 | – | 5 | – | 0 | 3 | – | 8 | – | 0 |
| Prairie View A&M | 0 | – | 6 | – | 0 | 0 | – | 11 | – | 0 |
+ – Conference co-champions; This conference was a hybrid of NCAA Division I-AA and Division II and programs. Prairie View was classified as Division II. All the other teams were I-AA.; Rankings from Associated Press poll

The 1979 Jackson State Tigers football team represented Jackson State University as a member of the Southwestern Athletic Conference (SWAC) during the 1979 NCAA Division I-AA football season. Led by fourth-year head coach W. C. Gorden, the Tigers compiled an overall record of 8–3 and a conference record of 4–2, placing third in the SWAC and ranking eighth nationally.

== Schedule ==
| Date | Opponent | Rank | Site | Result | Source |
|---|---|---|---|---|---|
| September 1 | Alabama State* | | Mississippi Veterans Memorial Stadium; Jackson, MS | W 14–7 | |
| September 8 | Tennessee State* | | Mississippi Veterans Memorial Stadium; Jackson, MS | W 27–21 | |
| September 15 | at Prairie View A&M | | Edward L. Blackshear Field; Prairie View, TX | W 24–6 | |
| September 22 | at Mississippi Valley State | No. 1 | Magnolia Stadium; Itta Bena, MS | W 36–14 | |
| October 6 | at Arkansas–Pine Bluff* | No. 2 | Pine Bluff, AR | W 49–7 | |
| October 13 | No. 5 Southern | No. 2 | Mississippi Veterans Memorial Stadium; Jackson, MS (rivalry) | W 34–0 | |
| October 20 | No. T–8 Grambling State | No. 2 | Mississippi Veterans Memorial Stadium; Jackson, MS | L 13–25 | |
| November 3 | vs. Texas Southern | No. 2 | Cardinal Stadium; Beaumont, TX | W 34–7 | |
| November 10 | at No. 5 Eastern Kentucky* | No. 2 | Hanger Field; Richmond, KY | L 21–27 | |
| November 17 | Langston* | No. 5 | Mississippi Veterans Memorial Stadium; Jackson, MS | W 49–6 | |
| November 22 | No. T–7 Alcorn State | No. T–5 | Mississippi Veterans Memorial Stadium; Jackson, MS (rivalry) | L 7–9 | |
*Non-conference game; Rankings from Associated Press Poll released prior to the game
