= 1979 Alcorn State Braves football team =

American college football season

1979 Alcorn State Braves football

SWAC co-champion
- Conference: Southwestern Athletic Conference
- Record: 8–2 (5–1 SWAC)
- Head coach: Marino Casem (16th season)
- Defensive coordinator: Dennis Thomas (1st season)
- Home stadium: Henderson Stadium

1979 Southwestern Athletic Conference football standings
	Conf.					Overall
Team	W		L		T	W		L		T
No. 6 Alcorn State +	5	–	1	–	0	8	–	2	–	0
No. 1 Grambling State +	5	–	1	–	0	8	–	3	–	0
No. 8 Jackson State	4	–	2	–	0	8	–	3	–	0
No. T–10 Southern	4	–	2	–	0	7	–	4	–	0
Mississippi Valley State	2	–	4	–	0	4	–	5	–	0
Texas Southern	1	–	5	–	0	3	–	8	–	0
Prairie View A&M	0	–	6	–	0	0	–	11	–	0
+ – Conference co-champions; This conference was a hybrid of NCAA Division I-AA and Division II and programs. Prairie View was classified as Division II. All the other teams were I-AA.; Rankings from Associated Press poll

The 1979 Alcorn State Braves football team represented Alcorn State University as a member of the Southwestern Athletic Conference (SWAC) during the 1979 NCAA Division I-AA football season. Led by 16th-year head coach Marino Casem, the Braves compiled an overall record of 8–2, with a conference record of 5–1, and finished as SWAC co-champion.

== Schedule ==
Date	Opponent	Rank	Site	Result	Attendance	Source
September 8	vs. Alabama State*		Ladd Stadium; Mobile, AL (Gulf Coast Classic)	L 5–6		
September 15	Grambling State		Mississippi Veterans Memorial Stadium; Jackson, MS	L 6–40		
September 29	South Carolina State*		Henderson Stadium; Lorman, MS	W 20–9		
October 6	at Texas Southern		Rice Stadium; Houston, TX	W 9–7		
October 13	Albany State*		Henderson Stadium; Lorman, MS	W 21–2	8,500	
October 20	at No. 7 Southern		University Stadium; Baton Rouge, LA	W 17–12		
October 27	at Bishop*	No. T–10	P.C. Cobb Stadium; Dallas, TX	W 23–21		
November 3	Mississippi Valley State	No. T–10	Henderson Stadium; Lorman, MS	W 24–3		
November 10	Prairie View A&M	No. 8	Henderson Stadium; Lorman, MS	W 19–0		
November 22	at No. T–5 Jackson State	No. T–7	Mississippi Veterans Memorial Stadium; Jackson, MS (rivalry)	W 9–7		
*Non-conference game; Rankings from AP Poll released prior to the game
