= 1979 Long Beach State 49ers football team =

American college football season

1979 Long Beach State 49ers football
- Conference: Pacific Coast Athletic Association
- Record: 7–4 (3–2 PCAA)
- Head coach: Dave Currey (3rd season)
- Home stadium: Anaheim Stadium

1979 Pacific Coast Athletic Association football standings
	Conf.					Overall
Team	W		L		T	W		L		T
Utah State $	5	–	0	–	0	8	–	3	–	0
Long Beach State	3	–	2	–	0	7	–	4	–	0
Fresno State	3	–	2	–	0	5	–	6	–	0
Cal State Fullerton	2	–	3	–	0	4	–	7	–	0
San Jose State	2	–	3	–	0	3	–	8	–	0
Pacific (CA)	0	–	5	–	0	3	–	7	–	0
$ – Conference champion; Records adjusted for San Jose State forfeits

The 1979 Long Beach State 49ers football team represented California State University, Long Beach (Note: The official name of Long Beach State has been California State University, Long Beach since 1972. However, it is still commonly known as Long Beach State.) during the 1979 NCAA Division I-A football season.

Cal State Long Beach competed in the Pacific Coast Athletic Association. (Note: The Big West Conference was known as the Pacific Coast Athletic Association from its founding in 1969 through 1987.) The team was led by third year head coach Dave Currey, and played home games at Anaheim Stadium in Anaheim, California. They finished the season with a record of seven wins, four losses (7–4, 3–2 PCAA).

== Schedule ==
Date	Time	Opponent	Site	Result	Attendance	Source
September 1	6:30 pm	at Utah*	Robert Rice Stadium; Salt Lake City, UT	L 10–34	26,238	
September 8	6:30 pm	at Boise State*	Bronco Stadium; Boise, ID	W 9–7	19,579	
September 29	4:30 pm	at Northern Illinois*	Huskie Stadium; DeKalb, IL	W 9–3	12,550	
October 6	12:30 pm	at Utah State	Romney Stadium; Logan, UT	L 28–51	16,056	
October 13	11:30 am	at Drake*	Drake Stadium; Des Moines, IA	W 17–14	8,658	
October 20	7:30 pm	Fresno State	Anaheim Stadium; Anaheim, CA	W 24–14	5,844	
October 27	7:30 pm	San Jose State	Anaheim Stadium; Anaheim, CA	L 42–53	6,428	
November 3	7:30 pm	Pacific (CA)	Anaheim Stadium; Anaheim, CA	W 17–15	5,733	
November 9	7:30 pm	No. 11 BYU*	Anaheim Stadium; Anaheim, CA	L 17–31	20,051	
November 17	11:30 am	at Wichita State*	Cessna Stadium; Wichita, KS	W 16–10	5,917	
November 24	7:30 pm	at Cal State Fullerton	Falcon Stadium; Norwalk, CA	W 16–13	5,250	
*Non-conference game; Rankings from AP Poll released prior to the game; All times are in Pacific time
