= 1979 Lafayette Leopards football team =

American college football season

1979 Lafayette Leopards football
- Conference: Independent
- Record: 5–3–2
- Head coach: Neil Putnam (9th season)
- Captains: Tim Gerhart; Rich Smith
- Home stadium: Fisher Field

1979 NCAA Division I-AA independents football standings
| | Conf. | | | Overall |
| Team | W | L | T | W | | L | | T |
|---|---|---|---|---|---|---|---|---|
| No. 4 Lehigh ^ | | – | | 10 | – | 3 | – | 0 |
| Florida A&M | | – | | 7 | – | 4 | – | 0 |
| Portland State | | – | | 6 | – | 5 | – | 0 |
| Lafayette | | – | | 5 | – | 3 | – | 2 |
| Bucknell | | – | | 4 | – | 4 | – | 2 |
| Northwestern State | | – | | 3 | – | 6 | – | 0 |
| Northeastern | | – | | 3 | – | 7 | – | 0 |
^ – NCAA Division I-AA playoff participant; Rankings from Associated Press poll

The 1979 Lafayette Leopards football team was an American football team that represented Lafayette College as an independent during the 1979 NCAA Division I-AA football season. In their ninth year under head coach Neil Putnam, the Leopards compiled a 5–3–2 record. Tim Gerhart and Rich Smith were the team captains. Lafayette played home games at Fisher Field on College Hill in Easton, Pennsylvania.

== Schedule ==
| Date | Opponent | Rank | Site | Result | Attendance | Source |
|---|---|---|---|---|---|---|
| September 8 | at Gettysburg | | Musselman Stadium; Gettysburg, PA | W 41–6 | 1,120 | |
| September 15 | at Merchant Marine | | Tomb Field; Kings Point, NY | W 33–6 | | |
| September 22 | at Davidson | No. 7 | Richardson Stadium; Davidson, NC | L 13–16 | 3,200 | |
| September 29 | Columbia | No. T–10 | Fisher Field; Easton, PA | W 14–7 | 8,500 | |
| October 13 | No. 6 Bucknell^{†} | No. T–8 | Fisher Field; Easton, PA | T 0–0 | 10,700 | |
| October 19 | at Penn | No. T–8 | Franklin Field; Philadelphia, PA | W 9–7 | 9,074 | |
| October 27 | Maine | No. 7 | Fisher Field; Easton, PA | L 21–34 | 6,000 | |
| November 3 | Colgate | | Fisher Field; Easton, PA | T 7–7 | 6,000 | |
| November 10 | Wagner | | Fisher Field; Easton, PA | W 21–3 | | |
| November 17 | at Lehigh | | Taylor Stadium; Bethlehem, PA (The Rivalry) | L 3–24 | 19,000 | |
^{†}Homecoming; Rankings from AP Poll released prior to the game
