= Mark McGrath (American football) =

American football player (born 1957)

No. 89, 83
- Position: Wide receiver

Personal information
- Born: December 17, 1957 (age 68); San Diego, California, U.S.
- Listed height: 6 ft 2 in (1.88 m)
- Listed weight: 185 lb (84 kg)

Career information
- High school: Shorecrest
- College: Montana State
- NFL draft: 1980: undrafted

Career history
- Seattle Seahawks (1980–1981); Washington Redskins (1983–1985)

Career NFL statistics
- Receptions: 15
- Receiving yards: 171
- Touchdowns: 1
- Stats at Pro Football Reference

Mark Allen McGrath (born December 17, 1957) is an American former professional football player who was a wide receiver in the National Football League (NFL) for the Seattle Seahawks and the Washington Redskins. He played college football for the Montana State Bobcats.
