= 1979 NCAA Division I-AA football season =

American college football season

1979 NCAA Division I-AA season

Regular season
- Number of teams: 39
- Duration: August–November

Playoff
- Duration: December 8–December 15
- Championship date: December 15, 1979
- Championship site: Orlando Stadium; Orlando, Florida
- Champion: Eastern Kentucky

NCAA Division I-AA football seasons
- «1978 1980»

The 1979 NCAA Division I-AA football season, part of college football in the United States organized by the National Collegiate Athletic Association at the Division I-AA level, began in August 1979, and concluded with the 1979 NCAA Division I-AA Football Championship Game on December 15, 1979, at Orlando Stadium in Orlando, Florida. The Eastern Kentucky Colonels won their first I-AA championship, defeating the Lehigh Engineers by a final score of 30−7.

== Conference changes and new programs ==
School	1978 Conference	1979 Conference
East Tennessee State	Ohio Valley (I-AA)	Southern (I-A)
Nevada	I-AA Independent	Big Sky

== Conference standings ==
1979 Big Sky Conference football standings
	Conf.					Overall
Team	W		L		T	W		L		T
Boise State *	7	–	0	–	0	10	–	1	–	0
No. 9 Montana State $	6	–	1	–	0	6	–	4	–	0
No. 5 Nevada ^	5	–	2	–	0	8	–	4	–	0
No. T–10 Northern Arizona	3	–	4	–	0	7	–	4	–	0
Weber State	3	–	4	–	0	3	–	8	–	0
Idaho	2	–	5	–	0	4	–	7	–	0
Montana	2	–	5	–	0	3	–	7	–	0
Idaho State	0	–	7	–	0	0	–	11	–	0
$ – Conference champion; ^ – NCAA Division I-AA playoff participant; * – Boise State was on probation; Rankings from NCAA Division I-AA AP Poll

1979 Southwestern Athletic Conference football standings
	Conf.					Overall
Team	W		L		T	W		L		T
No. 6 Alcorn State +	5	–	1	–	0	8	–	2	–	0
No. 1 Grambling State +	5	–	1	–	0	8	–	3	–	0
No. 8 Jackson State	4	–	2	–	0	8	–	3	–	0
No. T–10 Southern	4	–	2	–	0	7	–	4	–	0
Mississippi Valley State	2	–	4	–	0	4	–	5	–	0
Texas Southern	1	–	5	–	0	3	–	8	–	0
Prairie View A&M	0	–	6	–	0	0	–	11	–	0
+ – Conference co-champions; This conference was a hybrid of NCAA Division I-AA and Division II and programs. Prairie View was classified as Division II. All the other teams were I-AA.; Rankings from Associated Press poll

1979 Mid-Eastern Athletic Conference football standings
	Conf.					Overall
Team	W		L		T	W		L		T
Morgan State $	5	–	0	–	0	9	–	2	–	0
South Carolina State	4	–	1	–	0	8	–	3	–	0
North Carolina A&T	2	–	2	–	1	4	–	6	–	1
Howard	2	–	3	–	0	5	–	6	–	0
Delaware State	1	–	4	–	1	4	–	5	–	1
North Carolina Central	1	–	4	–	0	2	–	8	–	1
Maryland Eastern Shore	0	–	0	–	0	3	–	7	–	1
$ – Conference champion; Maryland Eastern Shore games did not count as conference games in 1979

1979 Yankee Conference football standings
	Conf.					Overall
Team	W		L		T	W		L		T
No. 7 Boston University +	4	–	1	–	0	8	–	1	–	1
UMass +	4	–	1	–	0	6	–	4	–	0
Connecticut	3	–	1	–	1	3	–	6	–	2
New Hampshire	2	–	2	–	1	5	–	4	–	2
Maine	1	–	4	–	0	1	–	9	–	1
Rhode Island	0	–	5	–	0	2	–	9	–	0
+ – Conference co-champions; Rankings from Associated Press poll

1979 Ohio Valley Conference football standings
	Conf.					Overall
Team	W		L		T	W		L		T
No. 2 Murray State $^	6	–	0	–	0	9	–	2	–	1
No. 3 Eastern Kentucky ^	5	–	1	–	0	11	–	2	–	0
Morehead State	3	–	2	–	1	5	–	4	–	1
Western Kentucky	3	–	3	–	0	5	–	5	–	0
Austin Peay	2	–	4	–	0	7	–	4	–	0
Middle Tennessee	1	–	5	–	0	1	–	9	–	0
Tennessee Tech	0	–	5	–	1	1	–	8	–	2
$ – Conference champion; ^ – NCAA Division I-AA playoff participant; Rankings from Associated Press poll

1979 NCAA Division I-AA independents football standings
	Conf.			Overall
Team	W	L	T	W		L		T
No. 4 Lehigh ^		–		10	–	3	–	0
Florida A&M		–		7	–	4	–	0
Portland State		–		6	–	5	–	0
Lafayette		–		5	–	3	–	2
Bucknell		–		4	–	4	–	2
Northwestern State		–		3	–	6	–	0
Northeastern		–		3	–	7	–	0
^ – NCAA Division I-AA playoff participant; Rankings from Associated Press poll

== Conference champions ==
Conference champions

Big Sky Conference – Montana State
Mid-Eastern Athletic Conference – Morgan State
Ohio Valley Conference – Murray State
Southwestern Athletic Conference – Alcorn State and Grambling State
Yankee Conference – Boston University and Massachusetts

== Postseason ==
=== NCAA Division I-AA playoff bracket ===
The bracket consisted of three regional selections (West, East, and South) plus Eastern Kentucky as an at-large selection.

Semifinals; December 8 Campus sites
East	Lehigh	28
South	Murray State*	9
West	Nevada	30
AtLg	Eastern Kentucky*	33**

National Championship Game; December 15; Orlando Stadium; Orlando, Florida
East	Lehigh	7
AtLg	Eastern Kentucky	30

* Next to name denotes host institution
* Next to score denotes overtimes

== See also ==
- 1979 NCAA Division I-A football season
- 1979 NCAA Division II football season
- 1979 NCAA Division III football season
- 1979 NAIA Division I football season
- 1979 NAIA Division II football season
