= 1979 NCAA Division I-AA football rankings =

The 1979 NCAA Division I-AA football rankings are from the Associated Press. This is for the 1979 season.

== Legend ==
	Increase in ranking
	Decrease in ranking
	Not ranked previous week
(#–#)	Win–loss record
(Italics)	Number of first place votes
т	Tied with team above or below also with this symbol

== Associated Press poll ==
	Week 1 Sept 18	Week 2 Sept 25	Week 3 Oct 2	Week 4 Oct 9	Week 5 Oct 16	Week 6 Oct 23	Week 7 Oct 30	Week 8 Nov 6	Week 9 Nov 13	Week 10 Nov 20	Week 11 Nov 27	
1.	Jackson State (3–0)	Florida A&M (2–0)	Florida A&M (3–0)	Florida A&M (4–0)	Florida A&M (5–0)	Eastern Kentucky (6–1)	Grambling State (6–2)	Grambling State (7–2)	Grambling State (8–2)	Grambling State (8–2)	Grambling State (8–2)	1.
2.	Florida A&M (1–0)	Jackson State (4–0)	Jackson State (4–0)	Jackson State (5–0)	Jackson State (6–0)	Florida A&M (5–1)	Jackson State (6–1)	Jackson State (7–1)	Boston University (8–1)	Murray State (9–1–1)	Murray State (9–1–1)	2.
3.	Grambling State (2–0)	Northern Arizona (3–0)	Boston University (3–0) т	Boston University (4–0)	Eastern Kentucky (5–1)	UMass (5–1)	Boston University (6–1)	Boston University (7–1)	Murray State (8–1–1)	Eastern Kentucky (9–2)	Eastern Kentucky (9–2)	3.
4.	New Hampshire (2–0)	Boston University (2–0)	Northern Arizona (4–0) т	Northern Arizona (5–0)	UMass (4–1)	Grambling State (5–2)	Murray State (7–1–1)	Murray State (8–1–1)	Eastern Kentucky (8–2)	Lehigh (9–2)	Lehigh (9–2)	4.
5.	Eastern Kentucky (2–0)	Southern (3–0)	Grambling State (3–1)	Southern (5–0)	Boston University (4–1)	Jackson State (6–1)	Florida A&M (5–2) т	Eastern Kentucky (7–2)	Jackson State (7–2)	Jackson State (8–2) т	Nevada (8–3)	5.
6.	Northern Arizona (2–0)	Grambling State (2–1)	Southern (4–0)	Bucknell (3–1)	Northern Arizona (5–1)	Boston University (5–1)	Eastern Kentucky (6–2) т	Montana State (6–3)	Lehigh (8–2)	Boston University (8–1–1) т	Alcorn State (8–2)	6.
7.	Lafayette (2–0)	Eastern Kentucky (2–1)	Bucknell (2–1) т	Eastern Kentucky (4–1)	Southern (5–1)	Lafayette (4–1–1)	Lehigh (6–2)	Lehigh (7–2)	Alcorn State (7–2)	Nevada (7–3) т	Boston University (8–1–1)	7.
8.	Austin Peay (2–0)	New Hampshire (2–1)	Eastern Kentucky (3–1) т	Lafayette (3–1) т	Bucknell (3–1–1) т	Murray State (6–1–1)	Montana State (5–3)	Alcorn State (6–2)	Nevada (6–3)	Northern Arizona (7–2) т	Jackson State (8–3)	8.
9.	Lehigh (2–0)	Nevada (2–1)	Lafayette (3–1)	Nevada (3–1) т	Lafayette (3–1–1) т	Montana State (4–3)	UMass (5–2)	UMass (5–2)	Montana State (6–4) т	Alcorn State (7–2) т	Montana State (6–4)	9.
10.	Boston University (1–0) т	Davidson (2–1) т	Nevada (2–1)	UMass (4–0)	Grambling State (4–2) т	Lehigh (5–2) т	Alcorn State (5–2) т	Nevada (6–2) т	Northern Arizona (6–3) т	Montana State (6–4) т	Northern Arizona (7–4) т	10.
11.	Nevada (1–1) т	Lafayette (2–1) т			Murray State (6–0) т	Alcorn State (5–1) т	Morehead State (6–2) т	New Hampshire (5–2–2) т		Florida A&M (6–3) т	Southern (6–4) т	11.
	Week 1 Sept 18	Week 2 Sept 25	Week 3 Oct 2	Week 4 Oct 9	Week 5 Oct 16	Week 6 Oct 23	Week 7 Oct 30	Week 8 Nov 6	Week 9 Nov 13	Week 10 Nov 20	Week 11 Nov 27	
		Dropped: 8 Austin Peay; 9 Lehigh	Dropped: 8 New Hampshire; 10 Davidson	Dropped: 5 Grambling State	Dropped: 9 Nevada	Dropped: 6 Northern Arizona; 7 Southern; 8 Bucknell	Dropped: 7 Lafayette	Dropped: 5 Florida A&M; 10 Morehead State	Dropped: 9 UMass; 10 New Hampshire	None	Dropped: 10 Florida A&M	

== Notes ==
- Boise State (10–1) was on probation for a November 1978 scouting violation and was ineligible for the poll.
