= List of Mid-Continent Conference football standings =

This is a list of yearly Association of Mid-Continent Universities football standings.

== Mid-Continent standings ==
1978 Association of Mid-Continent Universities football standings
	Conf.					Overall
Team	W		L		T	W		L		T
Youngstown State $^	5	–	0	–	0	10	–	2	–	0
Akron	4	–	1	–	0	6	–	5	–	0
Eastern Illinois ^	3	–	2	–	0	12	–	2	–	0
Northern Michigan	1	–	3	–	1	5	–	4	–	1
Western Illinois	1	–	3	–	1	3	–	6	–	1
Northern Iowa	0	–	5	–	0	2	–	9	–	0
$ – Conference champion; ^ – NCAA Division II playoff participant

1979 Association of Mid-Continent Universities football standings
	Conf.					Overall
Team	W		L		T	W		L		T
No. 2 Youngstown State $^	5	–	0	–	0	11	–	2	–	0
Northern Iowa	4	–	1	–	0	6	–	5	–	0
Akron	3	–	2	–	0	6	–	5	–	0
Eastern Illinois	1	–	4	–	0	7	–	4	–	0
Northern Michigan	1	–	4	–	0	4	–	6	–	0
Western Illinois	1	–	4	–	0	3	–	8	–	0
$ – Conference champion; ^ – NCAA Division II playoff participant; Rankings from NCAA Division II AP Poll

1980 Association of Mid-Continent Universities football standings
	Conf.					Overall
Team	W		L		T	W		L		T
Eastern Illinois $^	4	–	0	–	0	11	–	3	–	0
Northern Michigan ^	3	–	1	–	0	9	–	2	–	0
Northern Iowa	2	–	2	–	0	7	–	4	–	0
Youngstown State	1	–	3	–	0	2	–	8	–	1
Western Illinois	0	–	4	–	0	4	–	6	–	0
$ – Conference champion; ^ – NCAA Division II playoff participant

1981 Association of Mid-Continent Universities football standings
	Conf.					Overall
Team	W		L		T	W		L		T
Northern Iowa +	2	–	1	–	0	5	–	6	–	0
Eastern Illinois +	2	–	1	–	0	6	–	5	–	0
Western Illinois +	2	–	1	–	0	5	–	6	–	0
Southwest Missouri State	0	–	3	–	0	3	–	5	–	2
+ – Conference co-champions

1982 Association of Mid-Continent Universities football standings
	Conf.					Overall
Team	W		L		T	W		L		T
No. 5 Eastern Illinois +^	2	–	0	–	1	11	–	1	–	1
Northern Iowa +	2	–	0	–	1	4	–	6	–	1
Southwest Missouri State	1	–	2	–	0	5	–	6	–	0
Western Illinois	0	–	3	–	0	2	–	8	–	0
+ – Conference co-champions; ^ – NCAA Division I-AA playoff participant; Rankings from NCAA Division I-AA Football Committee poll

1983 Association of Mid-Continent Universities football standings
	Conf.					Overall
Team	W		L		T	W		L		T
No. 6 Eastern Illinois $^	3	–	0	–	0	9	–	3	–	0
Southwest Missouri State	2	–	1	–	0	6	–	5	–	0
Northern Iowa	1	–	2	–	0	6	–	5	–	0
Western Illinois	0	–	3	–	0	3	–	8	–	0
$ – Conference champion; ^ – NCAA Division I-AA playoff participant; Rankings from NCAA Division I-AA Football Committee poll

1984 Association of Mid-Continent Universities football standings
	Conf.					Overall
Team	W		L		T	W		L		T
No. 18 Northern Iowa +	2	–	1	–	0	9	–	2	–	0
Eastern Illinois +	2	–	1	–	0	6	–	5	–	0
Southwest Missouri State	1	–	1	–	1	6	–	3	–	1
Western Illinois	0	–	2	–	1	6	–	4	–	1
+ – Conference co-champions; Rankings from NCAA Division I-AA Football Committee poll
