= 1979 Little All-America college football team =

American college football all-star team

The 1979 Little All-America college football team is composed of college football players from small colleges and universities who were selected by the Associated Press (AP) as the best players at each position.

== First team ==
Position	Player	Team
Offense
Quarterback	Joe Aliotti	Boise State
Running back	Poke Cobb	Eastern Illinois
Running back	Frank Hawkins	Nevada
Running back	Mal Najarian	Boston University
Wide receiver	Jerry Young	UW–Whitewater
Tight end	Paul Muckenhirn	North Dakota
Tackle	Dave Melone	Lehigh
Tackle	Jeff Lear	Youngstown State
Guard	Herb Beck	Delaware
Guard	Tyrone McGriff	Florida A&M
Center	Jim Leonard	Santa Clara
Defense
Defensive end	Plummer Bullock	Virginia Union
Defensive end	Pete Catan	Eastern Illinois
Defensive tackle	Joe Gordon	Grambling State
Defensive tackle	Doug Scott	Boise State
Middle guard	Ernie England	St. John's (MN)
Linebacker	Andy Hawkins	Texas A&I
Linebacker	Ed Judie	Northern Arizona
Linebacker	Ezekiel Vaughn	Ouachita Baptist
Defensive back	Mike Ellis	Norfolk State
Defensive back	Terry Love	Murray State
Defensive back	Jack Quinn	Springfield (MA)

== See also ==
- 1979 College Football All-America Team
