= 1979 Nicholls State Colonels football team =

American college football season

1979 Nicholls State Colonels football
- Conference: Independent
- Record: 8–3
- Head coach: Bill Clements (6th season)
- Home stadium: John L. Guidry Stadium

1979 NCAA Division II independents football records
	Conf.			Overall
Team	W	L	T	W		L		T
No. 1 Delaware ^		–		13	–	1	–	0
Towson State		–		9	–	1	–	0
No. 4 Morgan State ^		–		9	–	2	–	0
Springfield		–		8	–	2	–	0
Eastern Washington		–		7	–	2	–	0
Nicholls State		–		8	–	3	–	0
United States International		–		8	–	3	–	0
American International		–		6	–	3	–	0
No. 10 Santa Clara		–		6	–	3	–	0
Kentucky State		–		6	–	5	–	0
Alabama State		–		6	–	5	–	0
Southeastern Louisiana		–		6	–	5	–	0
Central State (OH)		–		5	–	5	–	0
C.W. Post		–		5	–	4	–	0
Central Connecticut		–		4	–	5	–	0
James Madison		–		4	–	5	–	0
West Chester		–		4	–	7	–	0
Southern Connecticut State		–		3	–	7	–	0
Arkansas–Pine Bluff		–		2	–	8	–	0
Northern Colorado		–		2	–	8	–	0
^ – NCAA Division II playoff participant; Rankings from Associated Press poll

The 1979 Nicholls State Colonels football team represented Nicholls State University as an independent during the 1979 NCAA Division II football season. Led by sixth-year head coach Bill Clements, the Colonels compiled a record of 8–3. Nicholls State played home games at John L. Guidry Stadium in Thibodaux, Louisiana.

== Schedule ==
Date	Opponent	Site	Result	Attendance	Source
September 1	Arkansas–Monticello	John L. Guidry Stadium; Thibodaux, LA	W 37–7		
September 8	at Livingston	Tiger Stadium; Livingston, AL	W 21–14		
September 15	Sam Houston State	John L. Guidry Stadium; Thibodaux, LA	W 29–10		
September 22	at Troy State	Veterans Memorial Stadium; Troy, AL	L 15–35	6,250	
September 29	at Tennessee Tech	Tucker Stadium; Cookeville, TN	W 13–10	11,800	
October 6	at Northeast Louisiana	Malone Stadium; Monroe, LA	W 23–16		
October 20	Mississippi College	John L. Guidry Stadium; Thibodaux, LA	L 14–28		
October 27	Northwestern State	John L. Guidry Stadium; Thibodaux, LA (rivalry)	W 27–24		
November 3	Tennessee–Martin	John L. Guidry Stadium; Thibodaux, LA	W 15–7		
November 10	at Southeastern Louisiana	Strawberry Stadium; Hammond, LA (rivalry)	L 0–38	4,000	
November 17	Evangel	John L. Guidry Stadium; Thibodaux, LA	W 40–17		
