= 1979 James Madison Dukes football team =

American college football season

1979 James Madison Dukes football
- Conference: Independent
- Record: 4–6
- Head coach: Challace McMillin (8th season)
- Home stadium: Madison Stadium

1979 NCAA Division II independents football records
	Conf.			Overall
Team	W	L	T	W		L		T
No. 1 Delaware ^		–		13	–	1	–	0
Towson State		–		9	–	1	–	0
No. 4 Morgan State ^		–		9	–	2	–	0
Springfield		–		8	–	2	–	0
Eastern Washington		–		7	–	2	–	0
Nicholls State		–		8	–	3	–	0
United States International		–		8	–	3	–	0
American International		–		6	–	3	–	0
No. 10 Santa Clara		–		6	–	3	–	0
Kentucky State		–		6	–	5	–	0
Alabama State		–		6	–	5	–	0
Southeastern Louisiana		–		6	–	5	–	0
Central State (OH)		–		5	–	5	–	0
Central Connecticut		–		4	–	5	–	0
James Madison		–		4	–	5	–	0
West Chester		–		4	–	7	–	0
Southern Connecticut State		–		3	–	7	–	0
Arkansas–Pine Bluff		–		2	–	8	–	0
Northern Colorado		–		2	–	8	–	0
^ – NCAA Division II playoff participant; Rankings from Associated Press poll

The 1979 James Madison Dukes football team was an American football team that represented James Madison University during the 1979 NCAA Division II football season as an independent. Led by eighth-year head coach Challace McMillin, the Dukes compiled a record of 4–6.

== Schedule ==
Date	Opponent	Site	Result	Attendance	Source
September 1	Austin Peay	Madison Stadium; Harrisonburg, VA	L 6–10	7,500	
September 8	at East Tennessee State	Memorial Center; Johnson City, TN	L 0–31	7,383	
September 15	at Towson State	Towson Stadium; Towson, MD	L 8–18	3,825	
September 22	Hampden–Sydney	Madison Stadium; Harrisonburg, VA	W 17–0	7,500	
September 29	at Dayton	Welcome Stadium; Dayton, OH	L 15–35	8,201	
October 6	at William & Mary	Cary Field; Williamsburg, VA (rivalry)	L 0–33	12,000	
October 13	at Virginia	Scott Stadium; Charlottesville, VA	L 9–69	18,447	
October 27	Randolph–Macon	Madison Stadium; Harrisonburg, VA	W 54–0	10,000	
November 3	at Shippensburg	Seth Grove Stadium; Shippensburg, PA	W 10–7	5,700	
November 10	Morehead State	Madison Stadium; Harrisonburg, VA	W 16–3	4,800	
