= 1979 Troy State Trojans football team =

American college football season

1979 Troy State Trojans football
- Conference: Gulf South Conference
- Record: 6–3–1 (4–1 GSC)
- Head coach: Charlie Bradshaw (4th season)
- Home stadium: Veterans Memorial Stadium

1979 Gulf South Conference football standings
	Conf.					Overall
Team	W		L		T	W		L		T
No. 5 Mississippi College $^	5	–	1	–	0	10	–	3	–	0
Troy State	4	–	1	–	0	6	–	3	–	1
Tennessee–Martin	3	–	2	–	0	5	–	5	–	0
North Alabama	3	–	3	–	0	6	–	5	–	0
Delta State	2	–	4	–	0	4	–	6	–	0
Jacksonville State	1	–	5	–	0	4	–	6	–	0
Livingston	1	–	5	–	0	3	–	8	–	0
$ – Conference champion; ^ – NCAA Division II playoff participant; Rankings from AP Poll

The 1979 Troy State Trojans football team represented Troy State University (now known as Troy University) as a member of the Gulf South Conference (GSC) during the 1979 NCAA Division II football season. Led by fourth-year head coach Charlie Bradshaw, the Trojans compiled an overall record of 6–3–1, with a mark of 4–1 in conference play, and finished second in the GSC.

== Schedule ==
Date	Opponent	Site	Result	Attendance	Source
September 16	Texas A&I*	Veterans Memorial Stadium; Troy, AL	L 6–7	6,500	
September 15	at Eastern Kentucky*	Hanger Field; Richmond, KY	L 0–15	15,200	
September 22	Nicholls State*	Veterans Memorial Stadium; Troy, AL	W 35–15	6,250	
September 29	at Livingston	Tiger Stadium; Livingston, AL	W 64–0	6,000	
October 6	Southeastern Louisiana*	Veterans Memorial Stadium; Troy, AL	W 24–0	6,500	
October 13	at Delta State	Delta Field; Cleveland, MS	W 28–0	3,000	
October 20	North Alabama^{†}	Veterans Memorial Stadium; Troy, AL	W 27–14	9,000	
October 27	at Tennessee Tech*	Tucker Stadium; Cookeville, TN	T 17–17	2,200	
November 3	at No. 7 Mississippi College	Robinson Field; Clinton, MS	L 21–38	6,000	
November 10	Jacksonville State	Veterans Memorial Stadium; Troy, AL (rivalry)	W 12–10	5,250	
*Non-conference game; ^{†}Homecoming; Rankings from AP Poll released prior to the game
