= 1979 Maryland Eastern Shore Hawks football team =

American college football season

1979 Maryland Eastern Shore Hawks football
- Conference: Mid-Eastern Athletic Conference
- Record: 3–7–1 (0–0 MEAC)
- Head coach: Tyrone Caldwell (1st season)

1979 Mid-Eastern Athletic Conference football standings
	Conf.					Overall
Team	W		L		T	W		L		T
Morgan State $	5	–	0	–	0	9	–	2	–	0
South Carolina State	4	–	1	–	0	8	–	3	–	0
North Carolina A&T	2	–	2	–	1	4	–	6	–	1
Howard	2	–	3	–	0	5	–	6	–	0
Delaware State	1	–	4	–	1	4	–	5	–	1
North Carolina Central	1	–	4	–	0	2	–	8	–	1
Maryland Eastern Shore	0	–	0	–	0	3	–	7	–	1
$ – Conference champion; Maryland Eastern Shore games did not count as conference games in 1979

The 1979 Maryland Eastern Shore Hawks football team represented the University of Maryland Eastern Shore as a member of the Mid-Eastern Athletic Conference (MEAC) during the 1979 NCAA Division II football season. Led by first-year head coach Tyrone Caldwell, the Hawks compiled an overall record of 3–7–1, with a mark of 0–0 in conference play, and finished seventh in the MEAC.

Although the MEAC was classified as part of the NCAA Division I-AA, Maryland Eastern Shore (along with Morgan State and North Carolina Central) competed as part of Division II for the 1979 season.

In December the football program was officially suspended, and this made 1979 the final season for intercollegiate football at Maryland Eastern Shore.

== Schedule ==
Date	Opponent	Site	Result	Attendance	Source
September 1	Bowie State*	Princess Anne, MD	W 35–19		
September 8	at Virginia State*	Rogers Stadium; Ettrick, VA	L 0–29	4,500	
September 15	at Howard	Howard Stadium; Washington, DC	L 20–38	6,000	
September 22	Livingstone*	Princess Anne, MD	L 14–17		
September 29	Delaware State	Princess Anne, MD	L 13–19		
October 6	at No. 8 Morgan State	Hughes Stadium; Baltimore, MD	L 8–41	4,000	
October 13	at North Carolina A&T	World War Memorial Stadium; Greensboro, NC	W 16–6		
October 20	North Carolina Central	Princess Anne, MD	T 7–7		
October 27	at District of Columbia*	Washington, DC	L 21–28		
November 3	at Tuskegee*	Alumni Bowl; Tuskegee, AL	L 12–17	11,000	
November 10	Frostburg State*	Princess Anne, MD	W 19–13		
*Non-conference game; Rankings from AP Poll released prior to the game
