= Tyrone Caldwell =

American football player and coach (1947–2022)

Biographical details
- Born: March 23, 1947; Memphis, Tennessee, U.S.
- Died: January 4, 2022 (aged 74); Memphis, Tennessee, U.S.

Playing career
- 1966–1969: South Carolina State
- 1968: Alabama Hawks
- Positions: Defensive tackle, defensive end

Coaching career (HC unless noted)
- 1978: Maryland Eastern Shore (DC)
- 1979: Maryland Eastern Shore

Head coaching record
- Overall: 3–7–1

Tyrone Caldwell (March 23, 1947 – January 4, 2022) was an American football player and coach. He was selected by the San Diego Chargers in the 14th round of the 1970 NFL draft. Caldwell was the final head football coach at University of Maryland Eastern Shore, serving for one season, in 1979, and compiling a record of 3–7–1.

He died on January 4, 2022, at the age of 74.

== Head coaching record ==
Year	Team	Overall	Conference	Standing	Bowl/playoffs
Maryland Eastern Shore Hawks (Mid-Eastern Athletic Conference) (1979)
1979	Maryland Eastern Shore	3–7–1	0–0	N/A	
Maryland Eastern Shore:		3–7–1	0–0		
Total:		3–7–1			
