= 1979 Delaware Fightin' Blue Hens football team =

American college football season

1979 Delaware Fightin' Blue Hens football

NCAA Division II national champion

Zia Bowl, W 38–21 vs. Youngstown State
- Conference: Independent
- Record: 13–1
- Head coach: Tubby Raymond (14th season)
- Offensive coordinator: Ted Kempski (12th season)
- Offensive scheme: Delaware Wing-T
- Base defense: 5–2
- Captain: Jim Brandimarte
- Home stadium: Delaware Stadium

1979 NCAA Division II independents football records
	Conf.			Overall
Team	W	L	T	W		L		T
No. 1 Delaware ^		–		13	–	1	–	0
Towson State		–		9	–	1	–	0
No. 4 Morgan State ^		–		9	–	2	–	0
Springfield		–		8	–	2	–	0
Eastern Washington		–		7	–	2	–	0
Nicholls State		–		8	–	3	–	0
United States International		–		8	–	3	–	0
American International		–		6	–	3	–	0
No. 10 Santa Clara		–		6	–	3	–	0
Kentucky State		–		6	–	5	–	0
Alabama State		–		6	–	5	–	0
Southeastern Louisiana		–		6	–	5	–	0
Central State (OH)		–		5	–	5	–	0
Central Connecticut		–		4	–	5	–	0
James Madison		–		4	–	5	–	0
West Chester		–		4	–	7	–	0
Southern Connecticut State		–		3	–	7	–	0
Arkansas–Pine Bluff		–		2	–	8	–	0
Northern Colorado		–		2	–	8	–	0
^ – NCAA Division II playoff participant; Rankings from Associated Press poll

The 1979 Delaware Fightin' Blue Hens football team was an American football team that represented the University of Delaware as an independent during the 1979 NCAA Division II football season. In their 14th year under head coach Tubby Raymond, the Blue Hens compiled a 13–1 record, outscored opponents by a total of 546 to 228, and defeated Youngstown State, 38–21, in the Zia Bowl to win the Division II national championship. The team also received the Lambert Cup as the best Division II team in the east.

The Blue Hens were led by a high-scoring offense that averaged 39 points per games. They defeated Merchant Marine, 65–0, setting a school record with eight rushing touchdowns. It was at the time the second-highest margin of victory in school history, trailing a 93–0 victory over William & Mary in 1915.

Quarterback Scott Brunner tied the school record with 24 passing touchdowns. After the season, Brunner received first-team Division II Kodak All-America honors from the American Football Coaches Association (AFCA). He was also named the All-Eastern Collegiate Athletic Conference (ECAC) Division II Player of the Year. Other key players included:

- Offensive guard Herb Beck, a four-year starter, was selected as a first-team player on the 1979 Little All-America college football team. Tubby Raymond called Beck "one of the best football players we've ever had."
- Fullback Bo Dennis led the team in rushing with 861 yards.
- Jay Hooks set a school record, since broken, with 1,036 receiving yards.
- Lou Mariani ranked second on the team with 859 rushing yards, but led the team with 1,635 all-purpose yards. He returned a punt 76 yards against Virginia Union.
- Placekicker Brandt Kennedy set a school record, since broken, with 62 points after touchdown. Kennedy earned first-team All-East (ECAC) honors.

The team played its home games at Delaware Stadium in Newark, Delaware, and led Division II football in attendance, with 19,644 attendees per regular season home game.

== Schedule ==
Date	Opponent	Rank	Site	Result	Attendance	Source
September 8	at Rhode Island		Meade Stadium; Kingston, RI	W 34–14	7,141	
September 15	West Chester		Delaware Stadium; Newark, DE (rivalry)	W 42–6	18,975	
September 22	Temple		Delaware Stadium; Newark, DE	L 14–31	22,068	
September 29	Merchant Marine	No. 2	Delaware Stadium; Newark, DE	W 65–0	17,081	
October 6	Lehigh	No. 2	Delaware Stadium; Newark, DE (rivalry)	W 21–14	20,636	
October 13	at Villanova	No. 1	Villanova Stadium; Villanova, PA (rivalry)	W 21–20	14,500	
October 20	C.W. Post	No. 1	Delaware Stadium; Newark, DE	W 47–19	20,343	
October 27	William & Mary	No. 1	Delaware Stadium; Newark, DE (rivalry)	W 40–0	19,728	
November 3	Maine	No. 1	Delaware Stadium; Newark, DE	W 31–14	18,679	
November 10	at No. 2 Youngstown State	No. 1	Rayen Stadium; Youngstown, OH	W 51–45	13,142	
November 17	at Colgate	No. 1	Andy Kerr Stadium; Hamilton, NY	W 24–16	5,000	
November 24	No. 6 Virginia Union	No. 1	Delaware Stadium; Newark, DE (NCAA Division II Quarterfinal)	W 58–28	14,357	
December 1	No. 5 Mississippi College	No. 1	Delaware Stadium; Newark, DE (NCAA Division II Semifinal)	W 60–10	13,787	
December 8	vs. No. 2 Youngstown State	No. 1	University Stadium; Albuquerque, NM (Zia Bowl—NCAA Division II Championship Game)	W 38–21	4,000	
Rankings from AP Poll released prior to the game

== Honors ==
After the season, senior quarterback Scott Brunner earned American Football Coaches Association first-team All-America honors, Associated Press (AP) second-team All-America honors, All-Eastern Collegiate Athletic Conference (ECAC) Player of the Year honors, and first-team All-ECAC honors. Guard Herb Beck earned AP first-team All-America honors. Fullback Bo Dennis, tight end Jaime Young, center Mike Donnalley, linebacker Mike Wisniewski, cornerback Vince Hyland, and safety Guy Ramsey earned AP honorable mention All-America honors. Dennis, Young, Beck, Donnalley, Wisniewski, Hyland, Ramsey, and kicker Brandt Kennedy earned first-team All-East (ECAC) honors.
