= Stan Sheriff =

American football player, coach, and administrator (1932–1993)

No. 50, 65
- Positions: Linebacker, guard, center

Personal information
- Born: April 24, 1932; Honolulu, Hawaii, U.S.
- Died: January 16, 1993 (aged 60); Honolulu, Hawaii, U.S.
- Listed height: 6 ft 1 in (1.85 m)
- Listed weight: 224 lb (102 kg)

Career information
- High school: George Washington (San Francisco, California)
- College: Cal Poly
- NFL draft: 1954: 18th round, 214th overall pick

Career history

Playing
- Pittsburgh Steelers (1954); San Francisco 49ers (1956–1957); Cleveland Browns (1957)

Coaching
- Iowa State (1958–1959) Line; Iowa St. / State College of Iowa / Northern Iowa (1960–1982) Head coach

Operations
- Northern Iowa (1970–1983) Athletic director; Hawaii (1983–1993) Athletic director

Awards and highlights
- 3× NCC champion (1960–1962, 1964); 2× AMCU champion (1981–1982); First-team Little All-American (1953)

Career NFL statistics
- Interceptions: 1
- Fumble recoveries: 1
- Stats at Pro Football Reference

Head coaching record
- Career: Overall: 129–101–4 (.560); Bowls: 1–1–0 (.500); Tournaments: 0–1–0 (.000)

Bruce Stanley Sheriff (April 24, 1932 – January 16, 1993) was an American professional football player, coach, and college athletics administrator.

== Early life ==
Sheriff graduated from Washington High School in San Francisco.

== Playing career ==
He played college football at California Polytechnic State University from 1950 to 1953. In 1953, not only did Sheriff earn Little All-America accolades, but also was picked as an honorable mention for the UPI's overall Division I-level All-American Team, for which he received 17 voting points.

Sheriff then played professionally in the National Football League (NFL) with the Pittsburgh Steelers, San Francisco 49ers, and Cleveland Browns between 1954 and 1957. He was the 49ers' primary starter at left linebacker in both 1956 and 1957.

== Coaching career ==
Sheriff served as the head football coach at the University of Northern Iowa from 1960 to 1982, compiling a record of 129–101–4. The football field inside the UNI-Dome, Northern Iowa's football stadium, is named Sheriff Field in his honor.

== Athletic administration ==
Sheriff was then the athletic director at the University of Hawaii at Manoa from 1983 until his death in 1993. He died on January 16, 1993, in Honolulu, Hawaii, after suffering a heart attack at Honolulu International Airport.

The Stan Sheriff Center, the home venue for Hawaii's basketball and volleyball teams, was renamed in his honor in 1998. His alma mater, Cal Poly, regularly plays basketball and volleyball games annually in the arena bearing his name, as both schools are now members of the Big West Conference in those sports.

== Head coaching record ==
Year	Team	Overall	Conference	Standing	Bowl/playoffs
Iowa State Teachers / State College of Iowa / Northern Iowa Panthers (North Central Conference) (1960–1977)
1960	Iowa State Teachers	9–1	6–0	1st	L Mineral Water
1961	State College of Iowa	7–2	5–1	T–1st	
1962	State College of Iowa	7–1–1	5–0–1	T–1st	
1963	State College of Iowa	5–3–1	4–2	T–2nd	
1964	State College of Iowa	9–2	5–1	T–1st	W Pecan
1965	State College of Iowa	4–5	4–2	3rd	
1966	State College of Iowa	4–5	4–2	3rd	
1967	State College of Iowa	7–3	5–1	2nd	
1968	State College of Iowa	5–5	3–3	T–3rd	
1969	Northern Iowa	5–5	4–2	2nd	
1970	Northern Iowa	2–8	1–5	T–6th	
1971	Northern Iowa	4–5	4–2	T–2nd	
1972	Northern Iowa	4–6	3–4	T–4th	
1973	Northern Iowa	5–5	2–5	7th	
1974	Northern Iowa	5–4–1	3–3–1	T–5th	
1975	Northern Iowa	9–3	6–1	2nd	L NCAA Division II Quarterfinal
1976	Northern Iowa	8–3	4–2	3rd	
1977	Northern Iowa	6–5	4–3	T–2nd	
Northern Iowa Panthers (Association of Mid-Continent Universities) (1978–1982)
1978	Northern Iowa	2–9	0–5	6th	
1979	Northern Iowa	6–5	4–1	2nd	
1980	Northern Iowa	7–4	2–2	3rd	
1981	Northern Iowa	5–6	2–1	T–1st	
1982	Northern Iowa	4–6–1	2–0–1	T–1st	
Iowa State Teachers / State College of Iowa / Northern Iowa:		129–101–4	82–48–3		
Total:		129–101–4			
National championship Conference title Conference division title or championship game berth
