= 1979 Cal Poly Pomona Broncos football team =

American college football season

1979 Cal Poly Pomona Broncos football
- Conference: California Collegiate Athletic Association
- Record: 3–8 (0–2 CCAA)
- Head coach: Jim Jones (3rd season)
- Home stadium: Kellogg Field

1979 California Collegiate Athletic Association football standings
	Conf.					Overall
Team	W		L		T	W		L		T
No. 7 Cal Poly $	2	–	0	–	0	7	–	3	–	0
Cal State Northridge	1	–	1	–	0	3	–	7	–	0
Cal Poly Pomona	0	–	2	–	0	0	–	11	–	0
$ – Conference champion; Rankings from NCAA Division II AP Poll

The 1979 Cal Poly Pomona Broncos football team represented California State Polytechnic University, Pomona as a member of the California Collegiate Athletic Association (CCAA) during the 1979 NCAA Division II football season. Led by Jim Jones in his third and final season as head coach, Cal Poly Pomona compiled an overall record of 3–8 with a mark of 0–2 in conference play, placing last out of three teams in the CCAA. The team was outscored by its opponents 287 to 200 for the season. The Broncos played home games at Kellogg Field in Pomona, California.

== Schedule ==
Date	Opponent	Site	Result	Attendance	Source
September 15	at Puget Sound*	Baker Stadium; Tacoma, WA	L 23–28	2,800	
September 22	San Francisco State*	Kellogg Field; Pomona, CA	L 6–17	2,500	
September 29	at Sacramento State*	Hornet Stadium; Sacramento, CA	W 24–0	2,100–3,100	
October 6	United States International*	San Diego Stadium; San Diego, CA	L 15–30	600	
October 13	Occidental*	Kellogg Field; Pomona, CA	W 56–13	1,700–2,500	
October 20	UC Davis*	Kellogg Field; Pomona, CA	W 24–21	2,100–2,500	
October 27	at Southwestern Louisiana*	Cajun Field; Lafayette, LA	L 9–31	11,200	
November 3	Cal State Northridge	Kellogg Field; Pomona, CA	L 3–17	3,500–5,000	
November 10	at No. 7 Cal Poly	Mustang Stadium; San Luis Obispo, CA	L 34–38	5,520	
November 17	at Northern Arizona*	NAU Skydome; Flagstaff, AZ	L 3–21	8,781	
November 22	at Tennessee State*	Hale Stadium; Nashville, TN	L 3–71	5,500	
*Non-conference game; Rankings from Associated Press Poll released prior to the game
