= 1979 Cal State Northridge Matadors football team =

American college football season

1979 Cal State Northridge Matadors football
- Conference: California Collegiate Athletic Association
- Record: 3–7 (1–1 CCAA)
- Head coach: Tom Keele (1st season)
- Home stadium: North Campus Stadium

1979 California Collegiate Athletic Association football standings
	Conf.					Overall
Team	W		L		T	W		L		T
No. 7 Cal Poly $	2	–	0	–	0	7	–	3	–	0
Cal State Northridge	1	–	1	–	0	3	–	7	–	0
Cal Poly Pomona	0	–	2	–	0	0	–	11	–	0
$ – Conference champion; Rankings from NCAA Division II AP Poll

The 1979 Cal State Northridge Matadors football team represented California State University, Northridge as a member of the California Collegiate Athletic Association (CCAA) during the 1979 NCAA Division II football season. Led by first-year head coach Tom Keele, Cal State Northridge compiled an overall record of 3–7 with a mark of 1–1 in conference play, placing second in the CCAA. The team was outscored by its opponents 239 to 144 for the season. The Matadors played home games at North Campus Stadium in Northridge, California.

== Schedule ==
Date	Opponent	Site	Result	Attendance	Source
September 1	Santa Clara*	North Campus Stadium; Northridge, CA	L 9–21	3,200	
September 8	San Francisco State*	North Campus Stadium; Northridge, CA	L 14–17	2,950	
September 15	Cal State Hayward*	North Campus Stadium; Northridge, CA	W 10–8	2,500	
September 22	Humboldt State*	North Campus Stadium; Northridge, CA	W 18–14		
September 29	at Chico State*	University Stadium; Chico, CA	L 17–20		
October 13	at Portland State*	Civic Stadium; Portland, OR	L 21–34	12,000	
October 20	No. 8 Cal Poly	North Campus Stadium; Northridge, CA	L 20–38	5,000	
October 27	Cal State Fullerton*	North Campus Stadium; Northridge, CA	L 3–49	4,500	
November 3	at Cal Poly Pomona	Kellogg Field; Pomona, CA	W 17–3	3,500–5,000	
November 10	at Sacramento State*	Hornet Stadium; Sacramento, CA	L 15–35	1,178	
*Non-conference game; Rankings from Associated Press Poll released prior to the game
