= Dave Triplett =

American football player and coach (born 1950)

Biographical details
- Born: February 14, 1950 (age 76); Des Moines, Iowa, U.S.

Playing career
- 1970–1971: Iowa
- Positions: Wide receiver, running back

Coaching career (HC unless noted)
- 1972–1973: Assumption HS (IA)
- 1974–1975: Bishop Heelan Catholic HS (IA)
- 1976–1977: Iowa State (OT/TE)
- 1979–1988: South Dakota
- 1989–1994: Iowa (assistant)

Head coaching record
- Overall: 70–45 (college); 29–9 (high school)
- Tournaments: 3–2 (NCAA D-II playoffs)

Dave Triplett (born February 14, 1950) is an American former football coach.

== Career ==
Triplett played college football at the University of Iowa, from which he graduated in 1972. He was awarded the Big Ten Medal of Honor as a senior at Iowa in 1972.

Triplett began his coaching career in 1972 as head football coach at Assumption High School in Davenport, Iowa, where he served for two seasons with a record of 10–7.

He moved to Bishop Heelan Catholic High School in Sioux City, Iowa in 1974, coaching his teams to a 19–2 mark in two seasons and a state championship in 1975.

Triplett joined the college coaching ranks in 1976, working as an assistant coach at Iowa State University for two seasons under head coach Earle Bruce. Triplett served as special teams coordinator and running backs coach and spent two seasons as tight ends coach under Hayden Fry at Iowa.

He served as the head football coach at the University of South Dakota from 1979 to 1988, compiling a record of 70–45.

== Head coaching record ==
=== College ===
Year	Team	Overall	Conference	Standing	Bowl/playoffs	NCAA^{#}
South Dakota Coyotes (North Central Conference) (1979–1988)
1979	South Dakota	5–6	3–3	T–4th		
1980	South Dakota	5–6	3–3–1	5th		
1981	South Dakota	5–6	3–3–1	4th		
1982	South Dakota	6–5	4–2–1	3rd		
1983	South Dakota	7–4	6–3	3rd		
1984	South Dakota	8–3	7–2	3rd		
1985	South Dakota	10–3	7–2	T–2nd	L NCAA Division II Semifinal	4
1986	South Dakota	11–3	8–1	2nd	L NCAA Division II Championship	6
1987	South Dakota	7–4	5–4	T–4th		
1988	South Dakota	6–5	4–5	T–6th		
South Dakota:		70–45	50–28–3			
Total:		70–45				
