= Pete Rodriguez (gridiron football) =

American football coach (1940–2014)

Biographical details
- Born: July 25, 1940; Chicago, Illinois, U.S.
- Died: November 30, 2014 (aged 74); San Diego, California, U.S.
- Education: Western State College

Coaching career (HC unless noted)
- 1968–1969: Arizona (GA)
- 1970–1973: Western Illinois (assistant)
- 1974–1975: Florida State (DC/DL)
- 1976–1978: Iowa State (DC)
- 1979–1982: Western Illinois
- 1983–1984: Michigan Panthers (DL)
- 1985: Denver Gold (DL)
- 1986: Northern Iowa (DC)
- 1987: Ottawa Rough Riders (DC)
- 1988–1989: Los Angeles Raiders (ST)
- 1990–1993: Phoenix Cardinals (ST)
- 1994–1997: Washington Redskins (ST)
- 1998: Seattle Seahawks (AHC/ST)
- 1999–2003: Seattle Seahawks (ST)
- 2004–2006: Jacksonville Jaguars (ST)
- 2009: New York Sentinels (ST)

Head coaching record
- Overall: 14–28

Accomplishments and honors

Championships
- 1 Mid-Con (1981)

Pete Rodriguez (July 25, 1940 – November 30, 2014) was an American football coach of Mexican-American descent. He served as the head football coach at Western Illinois University from 1979 to 1982, compiling a record of 14–28.

== College coaching career ==
Rodriguez broke into coaching as a graduate assistant at Arizona (1968–1969). and later served as defensive coordinator at Western Illinois (1970–1973), Florida State (1974–1975), Iowa State (1976–1978) and Northern Iowa (1986). He served as head coach at Western Illinois from 1979 to 1982.

== Professional coaching career ==
=== USFL ===
Rodriguez served as defensive line coach for the Michigan Panthers of the United States Football League (USFL) from 1983 to 1984. He was part of the USFL's first championship team, helping the Panthers to the title in 1983. He spent the 1985 season as defensive line coach with the Denver Gold.

=== CFL ===
Rodriguez was the defensive coordinator for the Ottawa Rough Riders of the Canadian Football League in 1987.

=== NFL ===
Rodriguez entered the National Football League as the Los Angeles Raiders special teams coach (1988–89). He served in a similar capacity with the Phoenix Cardinals (1990–93), Washington Redskins (1994–97), Seattle Seahawks (1998–2003) and, most recently, the Jacksonville Jaguars (2004–2006).

=== UFL ===
Rodriguez served as the special teams coach for the New York Sentinels of the United Football League in 2009.

== Involvement with USC ==
In July, 2010 the Los Angeles Times reported that he was the coach hired by Pete Carroll as a special consultant for USC's kickers during the 2008 football season. The use of additional coach was one of the items that the NCAA found to be a Major Violation and subjected USC to the "Loss of institutional control" finding. Carroll had defended the hiring as being done with the knowledge of the USC compliance staff however the compliance staff reported that this was not the case.

== Personal ==
One of Rodriguez's daughters, Regina M. Rodriguez, serves as a United States district judge for the District of Colorado.

== Death ==
Rodriguez died in San Diego, on November 30, 2014, from a complication following an undisclosed surgery, after being in a coma for months.

== Head coaching record ==
Year	Team	Overall	Conference	Standing	Bowl/playoffs
Western Illinois Leathernecks (Association of Mid-Continent Universities) (1979–1982)
1979	Western Illinois	3–8	1–4	5th	
1980	Western Illinois	4–6	0–4	5th	
1981	Western Illinois	5–6	2–1	T–1st	
1982	Western Illinois	2–8	0–3	4th	
Western Illinois:		14–28	3–12		
Total:		14–28			
National championship Conference title Conference division title or championship game berth
