= 1979 North Carolina Central Eagles football team =

American college football season

1979 North Carolina Central Eagles football
- Conference: Mid-Eastern Athletic Conference
- Record: 2–8–1 (1–4 MEAC)
- Head coach: Henry Lattimore (1st season)
- Home stadium: O'Kelly Stadium

1979 Mid-Eastern Athletic Conference football standings
| | Conf. | | | | | Overall |
| Team | W | | L | | T | W | | L | | T |
|---|---|---|---|---|---|---|---|---|---|---|
| Morgan State $ | 5 | – | 0 | – | 0 | 9 | – | 2 | – | 0 |
| South Carolina State | 4 | – | 1 | – | 0 | 8 | – | 3 | – | 0 |
| North Carolina A&T | 2 | – | 2 | – | 1 | 4 | – | 6 | – | 1 |
| Howard | 2 | – | 3 | – | 0 | 5 | – | 6 | – | 0 |
| Delaware State | 1 | – | 4 | – | 1 | 4 | – | 5 | – | 1 |
| North Carolina Central | 1 | – | 4 | – | 0 | 2 | – | 8 | – | 1 |
| Maryland Eastern Shore | 0 | – | 0 | – | 0 | 3 | – | 7 | – | 1 |
$ – Conference champion; Maryland Eastern Shore games did not count as conference games in 1979

The 1979 North Carolina Central Eagles football team represented North Carolina Central University as a member of the Mid-Eastern Athletic Conference (MEAC) during the 1979 NCAA Division II football season. Led by first-year head coach Henry Lattimore, the Eagles compiled an overall record of 2–8–1, with a mark of 1–4 in conference play, and finished sixth in the MEAC.

Although the MEAC was classified as part of the NCAA Division I-AA, North Carolina Central (along with Morgan State and Maryland Eastern Shore) competed as part of Division II for the 1979 season.

== Schedule ==
| Date | Opponent | Site | Result | Attendance | Source |
|---|---|---|---|---|---|
| September 8 | Virginia Union* | O'Kelly Stadium; Durham, NC | L 12–14 | 8,500 | |
| September 15 | at Winston-Salem State* | Bowman Gray Stadium; Winston-Salem, NC | L 6–21 | 15,338 | |
| September 22 | at Elon* | Burlington Memorial Stadium; Burlington, NC | L 0–5 | 4,500 | |
| September 29 | No. 10 Morgan State | O'Kelly Stadium; Durham, NC | L 6–20 | 2,000–12,000 | |
| October 6 | at UMass* | Alumni Stadium; Hadley, MA | L 7–48 | 7,400 | |
| October 13 | Delaware State | O'Kelly Stadium; Durham, NC | W 31–26 | 13,500 | |
| October 20 | at Maryland Eastern Shore | Princess Anne, MD | T 7–7 | 4,000 | |
| October 27 | vs. South Carolina State | Johnson Hagood Stadium; Charleston, SC (Port City Classic) | L 6–26 | 13,000 | |
| November 3 | at Johnson C. Smith* | American Legion Memorial Stadium; Charlotte, NC | W 14–10 | 6,500–6,559 | |
| November 10 | Howard | O'Kelly Stadium; Durham, NC | L 20–31 | 6,500 | |
| November 17 | at North Carolina A&T | World War Memorial Stadium; Greensboro, NC (rivalry) | L 20–23 | 14,000 | |
*Non-conference game; Rankings from AP Poll released prior to the game
