= 1979 Jacksonville State Gamecocks football team =

American college football season

1979 Jacksonville State Gamecocks football
- Conference: Gulf South Conference
- Record: 4–6 (1–5 GSC)
- Head coach: Jim Fuller (3rd season)
- Offensive coordinator: Jack White (1st season)
- Defensive coordinator: Jerry Beach (1st season)
- Home stadium: Paul Snow Stadium

1979 Gulf South Conference football standings
	Conf.					Overall
Team	W		L		T	W		L		T
No. 5 Mississippi College $^	5	–	1	–	0	10	–	3	–	0
Troy State	4	–	1	–	0	6	–	3	–	1
Tennessee–Martin	3	–	2	–	0	5	–	5	–	0
North Alabama	3	–	3	–	0	6	–	5	–	0
Delta State	2	–	4	–	0	4	–	6	–	0
Jacksonville State	1	–	5	–	0	4	–	6	–	0
Livingston	1	–	5	–	0	3	–	8	–	0
$ – Conference champion; ^ – NCAA Division II playoff participant; Rankings from AP Poll

The 1979 Jacksonville State Gamecocks football team represented Jacksonville State University as a member of the Gulf South Conference (GSC) during the 1979 NCAA Division II football season. Led by third-year head coach Jim Fuller, the Gamecocks compiled an overall record of 4–6 with a mark of 1–5 in conference play, and finished tied for sixth in the GSC.

== Schedule ==
Date	Opponent	Site	Result	Attendance	Source
September 8	at Mississippi College	Robinson Field; Clinton, MS	L 7–17	4,250	
September 15	Alabama A&M*	Paul Snow Stadium; Jacksonville, AL	W 28–21	12,500	
September 22	Tennessee–Martin	Paul Snow Stadium; Jacksonville, AL	L 14–15	8,000	
October 6	Tennessee Tech*	Paul Snow Stadium; Jacksonville, AL	W 23–7	6,500	
October 13	Austin Peay*	Paul Snow Stadium; Jacksonville, AL	L 13–21	6,500	
October 20	Newberry*	Paul Snow Stadium; Jacksonville, AL	W 14–7	7,500	
October 27	at Delta State	Delta Field; Cleveland, MS	L 21–38	2,101	
November 3	Livingston^{†}	Paul Snow Stadium; Jacksonville, AL	W 59–0	12,000	
November 10	at Troy State	Veterans Memorial Stadium; Troy, AL (rivalry)	L 10–12	5,250	
November 17	at North Alabama	Braly Municipal Stadium; Florence, AL	L 14–28	4,500	
*Non-conference game; ^{†}Homecoming
