= 1979 North Dakota State Bison football team =

American college football season

1979 North Dakota State Bison football
- Conference: North Central Conference
- Record: 6–4 (4–2 NCC)
- Head coach: Don Morton (1st season)
- Defensive coordinator: Mike Daly (1st season)
- Home stadium: Dacotah Field

1979 North Central Conference football standings
	Conf.					Overall
Team	W		L		T	W		L		T
No. 3 North Dakota $^	5	–	1	–	0	10	–	2	–	0
No. 8 South Dakota State * ^	4	–	2	–	0	9	–	3	–	0
North Dakota State	4	–	2	–	0	6	–	4	–	0
Nebraska–Omaha	3	–	3	–	0	8	–	3	–	0
South Dakota *	3	–	3	–	0	5	–	6	–	0
Augustana (SD)	2	–	4	–	0	4	–	5	–	0
Morningside	0	–	6	–	0	0	–	10	–	0
Northern Colorado †	0	–	0	–	0	2	–	8	–	0
$ – Conference champion; ^ – NCAA Division II playoff participant; * – South Dakota State won two head-to-head games over South Dakota, which counted as one game for each team in the conference standings. † – Northern Colorado was ineligible for the conference title.; Rankings from AP Poll

The 1979 North Dakota State Bison football team was an American football team that represented North Dakota State University during the 1979 NCAA Division II football season as a member of the North Central Conference. In their first and second years under head coach Don Morton, the team compiled a 6–4 record.

== Schedule ==
Date	Opponent	Site	Result	Attendance	Source
September 8	Weber State*	Dacotah Field; Fargo, ND	W 11–10	10,150	
September 15	at Northern Iowa*	UNI-Dome; Cedar Falls, IA	L 10–21	9,500	
September 22	at South Dakota	Inman Field; Vermillion, SD	L 28–29	7,300	
September 29	Nebraska–Omaha	Dacotah Field; Fargo, ND	W 35–28	8,100	
October 6	at Northern Arizona*	NAU Skydome; Flagstaff, AZ	L 10–21	16,481	
October 13	No. 2 North Dakota^{†}	Dacotah Field; Fargo, ND (Nickel Trophy)	L 7–14	12,800	
October 20	at Morningside	Roberts Field; Sioux City, IA	W 24–0	3,500	
October 27	South Dakota State	Dacotah Field; Fargo, ND (rivalry)	W 38–14	5,800	
November 3	Augustana (SD)	Dacotah Field; Fargo, ND	W 33–20	2,650	
November 10	No. 6 (I-AA) Montana State*	Dacotah Field; Fargo, ND	W 21–7	2,250	
*Non-conference game; ^{†}Homecoming; Rankings from AP Poll released prior to the game
