= 1979 Austin Peay Governors football team =

American college football season

1979 Austin Peay Governors football
- Conference: Ohio Valley Conference
- Record: 7–4 (2–4 OVC)
- Head coach: Watson Brown (1st season)
- Home stadium: Municipal Stadium

1979 Ohio Valley Conference football standings
	Conf.					Overall
Team	W		L		T	W		L		T
No. 2 Murray State $^	6	–	0	–	0	9	–	2	–	1
No. 3 Eastern Kentucky ^	5	–	1	–	0	11	–	2	–	0
Morehead State	3	–	2	–	1	5	–	4	–	1
Western Kentucky	3	–	3	–	0	5	–	5	–	0
Austin Peay	2	–	4	–	0	7	–	4	–	0
Middle Tennessee	1	–	5	–	0	1	–	9	–	0
Tennessee Tech	0	–	5	–	1	1	–	8	–	2
$ – Conference champion; ^ – NCAA Division I-AA playoff participant; Rankings from Associated Press poll

The 1979 Austin Peay Governors football team represented Austin Peay State University as a member of the Ohio Valley Conference (OVC) during the 1979 NCAA Division I-AA football season. Led by first-year head coach Watson Brown, the Governors compiled an overall record of 7–4, with a mark of 2–4 in conference play, and finished fifth in the OVC.

== Schedule ==
Date	Opponent	Rank	Site	Result	Attendance	Source
September 1	at James Madison*		Madison Stadium; Harrisonburg, VA	W 10–6	7,500	
September 8	Tennessee–Martin*		Municipal Stadium; Clarksville, TN	W 34–7		
September 22	Western Kentucky	No. 8	Municipal Stadium; Clarksville, TN	L 20–24	9,000	
September 29	at No. 7 Eastern Kentucky		Hanger Field; Richmond, KY	L 10–35	12,800	
October 6	at Morehead State		Jayne Stadium; Morehead, KY	L 0–7		
October 13	at Jacksonville State*		Paul Snow Stadium; Jacksonville, AL	W 21–13	6,500	
October 20	Livingston*		Municipal Stadium; Clarksville, TN	W 14–0		
October 27	Middle Tennessee		Municipal Stadium; Clarksville, TN	W 31–14		
November 3	at No. 4 Murray State		Roy Stewart Stadium; Murray, KY	L 10–24		
November 10	at Tennessee Tech		Tucker Stadium; Cookeville, TN	W 21–14		
November 17	Mars Hill*		Municipal Stadium; Clarksville, TN	W 27–6	2,500	
*Non-conference game; Rankings from Associated Press Poll released prior to the game
