= 1979 Sacramento State Hornets football team =

American college football season

1979 Sacramento State Hornets football
- Conference: Far Western Conference
- Record: 4–6 (2–3 FWC)
- Head coach: Bob Mattos (2nd season)
- Home stadium: Hornet Stadium

1979 Far Western Conference football standings
	Conf.					Overall
Team	W		L		T	W		L		T
UC Davis $	5	–	0	–	0	7	–	2	–	1
Humboldt State	4	–	1	–	0	8	–	2	–	0
Chico State	2	–	3	–	0	5	–	6	–	0
Sacramento State	2	–	3	–	0	4	–	6	–	0
San Francisco State	1	–	4	–	0	3	–	7	–	0
Cal State Hayward	1	–	4	–	0	2	–	8	–	0
$ – Conference champion; Adjusted for Cal Poly Pomona forfeits to UC Davis and Sacramento State

The 1979 Sacramento State Hornets football team represented California State University, Sacramento as a member of the Far Western Conference (FWC) during the 1979 NCAA Division II football season. Led by second-year head coach Bob Mattos, Sacramento State compiled an overall record of 3–7 with a mark of 2–3 in conference play, placing in a three-way tie for fourth place the FWC. The team was outscored by its opponents 196 to 121 for the season. The Hornets played home games at Hornet Stadium in Sacramento, California.

Cal Poly Pomona was later determined to have used ineligible players during the 1979 season. As such, they were required to forfeit three games, including their non-conference victory over Sacramento State on September 29. With the forfeit, the Hornets' overall record improved to 4–6.

== Schedule ==
Date	Opponent	Site	Result	Attendance	Source
September 8	United States International*	Hornet Stadium; Sacramento, CA	L 7–9	3,500	
September 15	at North Dakota*	Memorial Stadium; Grand Forks, ND	L 0–31	13,200	
September 29	Cal Poly Pomona*	Hornet Stadium; Sacramento, CA	W 0–24 (forfeit win)	2,100–3,100	
October 6	at UC Davis	Toomey Field; Davis, CA (rivalry)	L 7–32	9,000	
October 13	San Francisco State	Hornet Stadium; Sacramento, CA	W 14–6	2,000	
October 20	at Cal Lutheran*	Mt. Clef Field; Thousand Oaks, CA	L 16–21	2,000–2,500	
October 27	at Chico State	University Stadium; Chico, CA	L 21–41	2,120	
November 3	Cal State Hayward	Hornet Stadium; Sacramento, CA	W 14–0	700	
November 10	Cal State Northridge*	Hornet Stadium; Sacramento, CA	W 35–15	1,178	
November 17	at Humboldt State	Redwood Bowl; Arcata, CA	L 7–17	2,000–3,500	
*Non-conference game
