= 1979 Tennessee Tech Golden Eagles football team =

American college football season

1979 Tennessee Tech Golden Eagles football
- Conference: Ohio Valley Conference
- Record: 1–8–2 (0–5–1 OVC)
- Head coach: Don Wade (12th season)
- Home stadium: Tucker Stadium

1979 Ohio Valley Conference football standings
	Conf.					Overall
Team	W		L		T	W		L		T
No. 2 Murray State $^	6	–	0	–	0	9	–	2	–	1
No. 3 Eastern Kentucky ^	5	–	1	–	0	11	–	2	–	0
Morehead State	3	–	2	–	1	5	–	4	–	1
Western Kentucky	3	–	3	–	0	5	–	5	–	0
Austin Peay	2	–	4	–	0	7	–	4	–	0
Middle Tennessee	1	–	5	–	0	1	–	9	–	0
Tennessee Tech	0	–	5	–	1	1	–	8	–	2
$ – Conference champion; ^ – NCAA Division I-AA playoff participant; Rankings from Associated Press poll

The 1979 Tennessee Tech Golden Eagles football team represented Tennessee Technological University (commonly referred to as Tennessee Tech) as a member of the Ohio Valley Conference (OVC) during the 1979 NCAA Division I-AA football season. Led by 12th-year head coach Don Wade, the Golden Eagles compiled an overall record of 1–8–2, with a mark of 0–5–1 in conference play, and finished last in the OVC.

== Schedule ==
Date	Opponent	Site	Result	Attendance	Source
September 8	at Western Carolina*	E. J. Whitmire Stadium; Cullowhee, NC	L 7–24	8,650	
September 15	Cameron*	Tucker Stadium; Cookeville, TN	W 21–6		
September 22	at Murray State	Roy Stewart Stadium; Murray, KY	L 3–24		
September 29	Nicholls State*	Tucker Stadium; Cookeville, TN	L 10–13	11,800	
October 6	at Jacksonville State*	Paul Snow Stadium; Jacksonville, AL	L 7–23	6,500	
October 13	at Western Kentucky	L. T. Smith Stadium; Bowling Green, KY	L 7–49	13,200	
October 20	Morehead State	Tucker Stadium; Cookeville, TN	T 3–3		
October 27	Troy State*	Tucker Stadium; Cookeville, TN	T 17–17	2,200	
November 3	at No. 5 Eastern Kentucky	Hanger Field; Richmond, KY	L 0–35		
November 10	Austin Peay	Tucker Stadium; Cookeville, TN	L 14–21		
November 17	at Middle Tennessee	Horace Jones Field; Murfreesboro, TN	L 14–17		
*Non-conference game; Rankings from Associated Press Poll released prior to the game
