= 1979 Howard Bison football team =

American college football season

1979 Howard Bison football
- Conference: Mid-Eastern Athletic Conference
- Record: 5–6 (2–3 MEAC)
- Head coach: Floyd Keith (1st season)
- Home stadium: Howard Stadium; RFK Stadium

1979 Mid-Eastern Athletic Conference football standings
	Conf.					Overall
Team	W		L		T	W		L		T
Morgan State $	5	–	0	–	0	9	–	2	–	0
South Carolina State	4	–	1	–	0	8	–	3	–	0
North Carolina A&T	2	–	2	–	1	4	–	6	–	1
Howard	2	–	3	–	0	5	–	6	–	0
Delaware State	1	–	4	–	1	4	–	5	–	1
North Carolina Central	1	–	4	–	0	2	–	8	–	1
Maryland Eastern Shore	0	–	0	–	0	3	–	7	–	1
$ – Conference champion; Maryland Eastern Shore games did not count as conference games in 1979

The 1979 Howard Bison football team represented Howard University as a member of the Mid-Eastern Athletic Conference (MEAC) during the 1979 NCAA Division I-AA football season. Led by first-year head coach Floyd Keith, the Bison compiled an overall record of 5–6, with a mark of 2–3 in conference play, and finished fourth in the MEAC.

== Schedule ==
Date	Opponent	Site	Result	Attendance	Source
September 8	West Virginia State*	Howard Stadium; Washington, DC	W 24–17		
September 15	Maryland Eastern Shore	Howard Stadium; Washington, DC	W 38–20	6,000	
September 22	at South Carolina State	State College Stadium; Orangeburg, SC	L 17–55	6,041	
September 29	No. 1 Florida A&M*	RFK Stadium; Washington, DC	L 13–21		
October 6	at Delaware State	Alumni Stadium; Dover, DE	W 23–0		
October 13	Virginia State*	RFK Stadium; Washington, DC	L 15–17		
October 20	at North Carolina A&T	World War Memorial Stadium; Greensboro, NC	L 0–29		
October 27	Hampton*	Howard Stadium; Washington, DC (rivalry)	W 28–12	5,000	
November 3	Southern*	Howard Stadium; Washington, DC	L 0–30		
November 10	at North Carolina Central	O'Kelly Stadium; Durham, NC	W 31–20	6,500	
November 17	at No. 4 (D-II) Morgan State	Hughes Stadium; Baltimore, MD (rivalry)	L 20–27	5,500	
*Non-conference game; Rankings from AP Poll released prior to the game
