= 1979 North Carolina A&T Aggies football team =

American college football season

1979 North Carolina A&T Aggies football
- Conference: Mid-Eastern Athletic Conference
- Record: 4–6–1 (2–2–1 MEAC)
- Head coach: James McKinley (3rd season)
- Home stadium: World War Memorial Stadium

1979 Mid-Eastern Athletic Conference football standings
	Conf.					Overall
Team	W		L		T	W		L		T
Morgan State $	5	–	0	–	0	9	–	2	–	0
South Carolina State	4	–	1	–	0	8	–	3	–	0
North Carolina A&T	2	–	2	–	1	4	–	6	–	1
Howard	2	–	3	–	0	5	–	6	–	0
Delaware State	1	–	4	–	1	4	–	5	–	1
North Carolina Central	1	–	4	–	0	2	–	8	–	1
Maryland Eastern Shore	0	–	0	–	0	3	–	7	–	1
$ – Conference champion; Maryland Eastern Shore games did not count as conference games in 1979

The 1979 North Carolina A&T Aggies football team represented North Carolina A&T State University as member of the Mid-Eastern Athletic Conference (MEAC) during the 1978 NCAA Division I-AA football season. Led by third-year head coach James McKinley, the Aggies compiled an overall record of 4–6–1 with a mark of 2–2–1 in conference play, placing third in the MEAC. North Carolina A&T played home games at World War Memorial Stadium in Greensboro, North Carolina.

== Schedule ==
Date	Opponent	Site	Result	Attendance	Source
September 1	at Winston-Salem State*	Groves Stadium; Winston-Salem, NC (rivalry)	W 14–7		
September 15	at South Carolina State	State College Stadium; Orangeburg, SC (rivalry)	L 3–23		
September 22	at Bethune–Cookman*	Gator Bowl Stadium; Jacksonville, FL	L 7–15	7,502	
September 29	Johnson C. Smith*	World War Memorial Stadium; Greensboro, NC	W 23–7		
October 6	at Norfolk State*	Foreman Field; Norfolk, VA	L 26–27	17,500	
October 13	Maryland Eastern Shore	World War Memorial Stadium; Greensboro, NC	L 6–16		
October 20	Howard	World War Memorial Stadium; Greensboro, NC	W 29–0		
October 27	at No. T–6 Morgan State	Hughes Stadium; Baltimore, MD	L 9–29		
November 3	Tennessee State*	World War Memorial Stadium; Greensboro, NC	L 14–37		
November 10	at Delaware State	Alumni Stadium; Dover, DE	T 21–21		
November 17	North Carolina Central	World War Memorial Stadium; Greensboro, NC (rivalry)	W 23–20	14,000	
*Non-conference game; Rankings from AP Poll released prior to the game
