= 1979 Akron Zips football team =

American college football season

1979 Akron Zips football
- Conference: Mid-Continent Conference
- Record: 6–5 (3–2 MCC)
- Head coach: Jim Dennison (7th season)
- Captain: Curtis Howard; Bob Maxwell; Dennis McGlone; Paul Winters
- Home stadium: Rubber Bowl

1979 Association of Mid-Continent Universities football standings
	Conf.					Overall
Team	W		L		T	W		L		T
No. 2 Youngstown State $^	5	–	0	–	0	11	–	2	–	0
Northern Iowa	4	–	1	–	0	6	–	5	–	0
Akron	3	–	2	–	0	6	–	5	–	0
Eastern Illinois	1	–	4	–	0	7	–	4	–	0
Northern Michigan	1	–	4	–	0	4	–	6	–	0
Western Illinois	1	–	4	–	0	3	–	8	–	0
$ – Conference champion; ^ – NCAA Division II playoff participant; Rankings from NCAA Division II AP Poll

The 1979 Akron Zips football team represented Akron University in the 1979 NCAA Division II football season as a member of the Mid-Continent Conference. Led by seventh-year head coach Jim Dennison, the Zips played their home games at the Rubber Bowl in Akron, Ohio. They finished the season with a record of 6–5 overall and 3–2 in MCC play, placing third.

== Schedule ==
Date	Opponent	Site	Result	Attendance	Source
September 8	Western Illinois	Rubber Bowl; Akron, OH	W 24–7	32,113	
September 15	Kent State*	Rubber Bowl; Akron, OH (Wagon Wheel)	W 15–13	21,645	
September 22	at Boise State*	Bronco Stadium; Boise, ID	L 21–31	19,642	
September 29	Indiana State*	Rubber Bowl; Akron, OH	L 27–28	11,684	
October 6	at Northern Iowa	UNI-Dome; Cedar Falls, IA	L 17–20	9,500	
October 13	at Eastern Michigan*	Rynearson Stadium; Ypsilanti, MI	W 24–12	4,555	
October 20	No. 2 Youngstown State	Rubber Bowl; Akron, OH (Steel Tire)	L 3–16	10,111	
October 27	Northern Michigan	Rubber Bowl; Akron, OH	W 45–21	6,044	
November 3	at No. 10 (I-AA) Morehead State*	Jayne Stadium; Morehead, KY	W 23–17	4,000	
November 10	at Temple*	Veterans Stadium; Philadelphia, PA	L 6–42	8,398	
November 17	at Eastern Illinois	O'Brien Field; Charleston, IL	W 27–16	6,500	
*Non-conference game; Rankings from AP Poll released prior to the game
