= 1979 Morehead State Eagles football team =

American college football season

1979 Morehead State Eagles football
- Conference: Ohio Valley Conference
- Record: 5–4–1 (3–2–1 OVC)
- Head coach: Tom Lichtenberg (1st season)
- Home stadium: Jayne Stadium

1979 Ohio Valley Conference football standings
	Conf.					Overall
Team	W		L		T	W		L		T
No. 2 Murray State $^	6	–	0	–	0	9	–	2	–	1
No. 3 Eastern Kentucky ^	5	–	1	–	0	11	–	2	–	0
Morehead State	3	–	2	–	1	5	–	4	–	1
Western Kentucky	3	–	3	–	0	5	–	5	–	0
Austin Peay	2	–	4	–	0	7	–	4	–	0
Middle Tennessee	1	–	5	–	0	1	–	9	–	0
Tennessee Tech	0	–	5	–	1	1	–	8	–	2
$ – Conference champion; ^ – NCAA Division I-AA playoff participant; Rankings from Associated Press poll

The 1979 Morehead State Eagles football team represented Morehead State University as a member of the Ohio Valley Conference (OVC) during the 1979 NCAA Division I-AA football season. Led by first-year head coach Tom Lichtenberg, the Eagles compiled an overall record of 5–4–1, with a mark of 3–2–1 in conference play, and finished third in the OVC.

== Schedule ==
Date	Opponent	Rank	Site	Result	Attendance	Source
September 15	Kentucky State*		Alumni Field; Frankfort, KY	W 14–7	3,600	
September 22	Middle Tennessee		Jayne Stadium; Morehead, KY	W 28–7	3,000	
September 29	at Murray State		Roy Stewart Stadium; Murray, KY	L 7–31		
October 6	Austin Peay		Jayne Stadium; Morehead, KY	W 7–0		
October 13	Tennessee–Martin*		Jayne Stadium; Morehead, KY	W 7–0		
October 20	at Tennessee Tech		Tucker Stadium; Cookeville, TN	T 3–3		
October 27	at Western Kentucky		L. T. Smith Stadium; Bowling Green, KY	W 3–0	19,800	
November 3	Akron*	No. 10	Jayne Stadium; Morehead, KY	L 17–23	4,000	
November 10	at James Madison*		Madison Stadium; Harrisonburg, VA	L 3–16	4,800	
November 17	No. 4 Eastern Kentucky		Jayne Stadium; Morehead, KY (rivalry)	L 7–34	9,600	
*Non-conference game; Rankings from Associated Press Poll released prior to the game
