= 1979 NCAA Division II football season =

American college football season

- Regular season: August – November 1979
- Playoffs: December 1979
- National Championship: Zia Bowl; University Stadium; Albuquerque, NM
- Champion: Delaware

The 1979 NCAA Division II football season, part of college football in the United States organized by the National Collegiate Athletic Association at the Division II level, began in August 1979, and concluded with the NCAA Division II Football Championship in December 1979 at University Stadium in Albuquerque, NM. During the game's two-year stretch in New Mexico, it was referred to as the Zia Bowl. The Delaware Fightin' Blue Hens defeated the Youngstown State Penguins, 38–21, to win their first Division II national title.

== Conference changes and new programs ==
School	1978 Conference	1979 Conference
Bowie State	D-III Independent	CIAA
Eastern Washington	Evergreen (NAIA)	Independent
James Madison	D-III Independent	D-II Independent
Nicholls State	Gulf South	Independent
Northern Colorado	Independent	North Central
Shaw	CIAA	Dropped Program
Southeastern Louisiana	Gulf South	Independent
Towson State	D-III Independent	D-II Independent

== Conference standings ==
1979 Association of Mid-Continent Universities football standings
	Conf.					Overall
Team	W		L		T	W		L		T
No. 2 Youngstown State $^	5	–	0	–	0	11	–	2	–	0
Northern Iowa	4	–	1	–	0	6	–	5	–	0
Akron	3	–	2	–	0	6	–	5	–	0
Eastern Illinois	1	–	4	–	0	7	–	4	–	0
Northern Michigan	1	–	4	–	0	4	–	6	–	0
Western Illinois	1	–	4	–	0	3	–	8	–	0
$ – Conference champion; ^ – NCAA Division II playoff participant; Rankings from NCAA Division II AP Poll

1979 California Collegiate Athletic Association football standings
	Conf.					Overall
Team	W		L		T	W		L		T
No. 7 Cal Poly $	2	–	0	–	0	7	–	3	–	0
Cal State Northridge	1	–	1	–	0	3	–	7	–	0
Cal Poly Pomona	0	–	2	–	0	0	–	11	–	0
$ – Conference champion; Rankings from NCAA Division II AP Poll

1979 Central Intercollegiate Athletic Association football standings
	Conf.					Overall
Team	W		L		T	W		L		T
No. 6 Virginia Union $^	8	–	0	–	0	10	–	2	–	0
Winston-Salem State	6	–	1	–	1	8	–	2	–	1
Norfolk State	6	–	1	–	1	8	–	3	–	1
Virginia State	5	–	2	–	1	6	–	4	–	1
Fayetteville State	4	–	3	–	1	4	–	4	–	1
Elizabeth City State	2	–	6	–	0	3	–	7	–	0
Hampton	2	–	6	–	0	3	–	8	–	0
Livingstone	2	–	6	–	0	3	–	8	–	0
Johnson C. Smith	1	–	6	–	1	1	–	9	–	1
Saint Paul's (VA)	0	–	8	–	0	0	–	9	–	0
Bowie State *	0	–	0	–	0	2	–	8	–	0
$ – Conference champion; ^ – NCAA Division II playoff participant; * – ineligible for conference title; Rankings from NCAA Division II AP Poll

1979 Far Western Conference football standings
	Conf.					Overall
Team	W		L		T	W		L		T
UC Davis $	5	–	0	–	0	7	–	2	–	1
Humboldt State	4	–	1	–	0	8	–	2	–	0
Chico State	2	–	3	–	0	5	–	6	–	0
Sacramento State	2	–	3	–	0	4	–	6	–	0
San Francisco State	1	–	4	–	0	3	–	7	–	0
Cal State Hayward	1	–	4	–	0	2	–	8	–	0
$ – Conference champion; Adjusted for Cal Poly Pomona forfeits to UC Davis and Sacramento State

1979 Great Lakes Intercollegiate Athletic Conference football standings
	Conf.					Overall
Team	W		L		T	W		L		T
No. 8 Saginaw Valley State $^	4	–	0	–	1	8	–	2	–	1
Wayne State (MI)	3	–	1	–	1	3	–	5	–	1
Ferris State	3	–	2	–	0	5	–	4	–	1
Grand Valley State	2	–	3	–	0	4	–	5	–	0
Northwood	1	–	4	–	0	5	–	4	–	0
Hillsdale	1	–	4	–	0	3	–	8	–	0
$ – Conference champion; ^ – NAIA Division I playoff participant; Rankings from NAIA Division I poll

1979 Gulf South Conference football standings
	Conf.					Overall
Team	W		L		T	W		L		T
No. 5 Mississippi College $^	5	–	1	–	0	10	–	3	–	0
Troy State	4	–	1	–	0	6	–	3	–	1
Tennessee–Martin	3	–	2	–	0	5	–	5	–	0
North Alabama	3	–	3	–	0	6	–	5	–	0
Delta State	2	–	4	–	0	4	–	6	–	0
Jacksonville State	1	–	5	–	0	4	–	6	–	0
Livingston	1	–	5	–	0	3	–	8	–	0
$ – Conference champion; ^ – NCAA Division II playoff participant; Rankings from AP Poll

1979 Heartland Collegiate Conference standings
	Conf.					Overall
Team	W		L		T	W		L		T
Saint Joseph's (IN) $	4	–	1	–	0	8	–	2	–	0
Franklin (IN)	5	–	2	–	0	6	–	4	–	0
Butler	3	–	2	–	0	5	–	5	–	0
Valparaiso	2	–	3	–	0	5	–	4	–	0
Indiana Central	2	–	4	–	0	3	–	6	–	0
Evansville	0	–	6	–	0	2	–	9	–	0
Georgetown (KY) *	3	–	0	–	0	4	–	6	–	0
Ashland *	0	–	1	–	0	3	–	6	–	0
$ – Conference champion; * – ineligible for conference title

1979 Mid-Eastern Athletic Conference football standings
	Conf.					Overall
Team	W		L		T	W		L		T
Morgan State $	5	–	0	–	0	9	–	2	–	0
South Carolina State	4	–	1	–	0	8	–	3	–	0
North Carolina A&T	2	–	2	–	1	4	–	6	–	1
Howard	2	–	3	–	0	5	–	6	–	0
Delaware State	1	–	4	–	1	4	–	5	–	1
North Carolina Central	1	–	4	–	0	2	–	8	–	1
Maryland Eastern Shore	0	–	0	–	0	3	–	7	–	1
$ – Conference champion; Maryland Eastern Shore games did not count as conference games in 1979

1979 Missouri Intercollegiate Athletic Association football standings
	Conf.					Overall
Team	W		L		T	W		L		T
NW Missouri State $	5	–	1	–	0	6	–	5	–	0
SE Missouri State	5	–	1	–	0	6	–	4	–	1
Missouri-Rolla	3	–	3	–	0	7	–	3	–	1
SW Missouri State	3	–	3	–	0	7	–	4	–	0
NE Missouri State	3	–	3	–	0	4	–	7	–	0
Central Missouri State	1	–	5	–	0	2	–	8	–	0
Lincoln (MO)	1	–	5	–	0	4	–	7	–	0
$ – Conference champion; ^ – NCAA Division II playoff participant

1979 North Central Conference football standings
	Conf.					Overall
Team	W		L		T	W		L		T
No. 3 North Dakota $^	5	–	1	–	0	10	–	2	–	0
No. 8 South Dakota State * ^	4	–	2	–	0	9	–	3	–	0
North Dakota State	4	–	2	–	0	6	–	4	–	0
Nebraska–Omaha	3	–	3	–	0	8	–	3	–	0
South Dakota *	3	–	3	–	0	5	–	6	–	0
Augustana (SD)	2	–	4	–	0	4	–	5	–	0
Morningside	0	–	6	–	0	0	–	10	–	0
Northern Colorado †	0	–	0	–	0	2	–	8	–	0
$ – Conference champion; ^ – NCAA Division II playoff participant; * – South Dakota State won two head-to-head games over South Dakota, which counted as one game for each team in the conference standings. † – Northern Colorado was ineligible for the conference title.; Rankings from AP Poll

1979 Northern Intercollegiate Conference football standings
	Conf.					Overall
Team	W		L		T	W		L		T
Minnesota Duluth +	7	–	1	–	0	8	–	2	–	0
Moorhead State +	7	–	1	–	0	8	–	3	–	0
Minnesota Morris ^	6	–	2	–	0	9	–	2	–	0
St. Cloud State	5	–	3	–	0	5	–	6	–	0
Mankato State	4	–	4	–	0	5	–	5	–	0
Michigan Tech	4	–	4	–	0	4	–	6	–	0
Southwest State (MN)	2	–	6	–	0	4	–	7	–	0
Bemidji State	1	–	7	–	0	1	–	8	–	1
Winona State	0	–	8	–	0	0	–	11	–	0
+ – Conference co-champions; ^ – NCAA Division III playoff participant

1979 Pennsylvania State Athletic Conference football standings
	Conf.					Overall
Team	W		L		T	W		L		T
East Division
Cheyney xy	4	–	1	–	0	9	–	2	–	0
Millersville x^	4	–	1	–	0	8	–	2	–	0
East Stroudsburg	3	–	2	–	0	7	–	3	–	0
Kutztown	3	–	2	–	0	6	–	3	–	0
Bloomsburg	1	–	4	–	0	2	–	8	–	0
Mansfield	0	–	5	–	0	0	–	9	–	0
West Division
Lock Haven xy$	6	–	0	–	0	9	–	2	–	0
Clarion	5	–	1	–	0	9	–	1	–	0
Indiana (PA)	3	–	3	–	0	7	–	3	–	0
Slippery Rock	2	–	4	–	0	3	–	6	–	0
Edinboro	2	–	4	–	0	4	–	6	–	0
Shippensburg	2	–	4	–	0	4	–	6	–	0
California (PA)	1	–	5	–	0	3	–	7	–	0
Championship: Lock Haven 48, Cheyney 14
$ – Conference champion; x – Division champion/co-champions; y – Championship game participant; ^ – NCAA Division III playoff participant

1979 Southern Intercollegiate Athletic Conference football standings
	Conf.					Overall
Team	W		L		T	W		L		T
Division I
No. 9 Alabama A&M x^	5	–	0	–	0	8	–	3	–	0
Morris Brown	6	–	2	–	0	6	–	5	–	0
Tuskegee	3	–	2	–	0	5	–	6	–	0
Bethune-Cookman	1	–	3	–	0	5	–	6	–	0
Albany State	1	–	6	–	0	1	–	9	–	1
Division II
Morehouse x	6	–	2	–	0	6	–	3	–	0
Savannah State	5	–	2	–	1	6	–	3	–	1
Knoxville	2	–	4	–	0	6	–	4	–	0
Fort Valley State	4	–	4	–	1	4	–	4	–	1
Fisk	2	–	3	–	1	2	–	4	–	1
Clark	2	–	5	–	1	2	–	5	–	1
Lane	1	–	5	–	0	1	–	7	–	0
x – Division champion/co-champions; ^ – NCAA Division II playoff participant; Rankings from Associated Press poll

1979 West Virginia Intercollegiate Athletic Conference football standings
	Conf.					Overall
Team	W		L		T	W		L		T
Northern Division
No. 10 Fairmont State xy$	7	–	1	–	1	9	–	1	–	1
No. T–15th West Liberty State x	7	–	1	–	1	7	–	2	–	1
Salem	6	–	2	–	1	6	–	3	–	1
Shepherd	5	–	4	–	0	5	–	5	–	0
West Virginia Wesleyan	1	–	8	–	0	1	–	8	–	0
Southern Division
West Virginia State xy	6	–	3	–	0	6	–	5	–	0
Concord	4	–	3	–	2	5	–	3	–	2
Glenville State	3	–	6	–	0	4	–	6	–	0
West Virginia Tech	1	–	6	–	2	1	–	6	–	2
Bluefield State	1	–	7	–	1	1	–	8	–	1
Championship: Fairmont State 14, West Virginia State 13
$ – Conference champion; x – Division champion/co-champions; y – Championship game participant; Rankings from NAIA Division I poll

1979 NCAA Division II independents football records
	Conf.			Overall
Team	W	L	T	W		L		T
No. 1 Delaware ^		–		13	–	1	–	0
Towson State		–		9	–	1	–	0
No. 4 Morgan State ^		–		9	–	2	–	0
Eastern Washington		–		7	–	2	–	0
Nicholls State		–		8	–	3	–	0
United States International		–		8	–	3	–	0
American International		–		6	–	3	–	0
No. 10 Santa Clara		–		6	–	3	–	0
Kentucky State		–		6	–	5	–	0
Southeastern Louisiana		–		6	–	5	–	0
Central State (OH)		–		5	–	5	–	0
Central Connecticut		–		4	–	5	–	0
James Madison		–		4	–	5	–	0
West Chester		–		4	–	7	–	0
Southern Connecticut State		–		3	–	7	–	0
Arkansas–Pine Bluff		–		2	–	8	–	0
Northern Colorado		–		2	–	8	–	0
^ – NCAA Division II playoff participant; Rankings from Associated Press poll

== Conference summaries ==
Conference	Champions
Association of Mid-Continent Universities	Youngstown State
California Collegiate Athletic Association	Cal Poly
Central Intercollegiate Athletic Association	Virginia Union
Far Western Football Conference	UC Davis
Great Lakes Intercollegiate Athletic Conference	Saginaw Valley State
Gulf South Conference	Mississippi College
Heartland Collegiate Conference	Saint Joseph's
Missouri Intercollegiate Athletic Association	Northwest Missouri State
North Central Conference	North Dakota
Southern Intercollegiate Athletic Conference	Alabama A&M

== Postseason ==
1979 NCAA Division II Football Championship
- Teams: 8
- Finals Site: University Stadium; Albuquerque, NM
- Champion: Delaware; (1st title, 3rd title game)
- Runner-up: Youngstown State; (1st title game)
- Semifinalists: Mississippi College; Alabama A&M
- Winning coach: Tubby Raymond; 1st championship

The 1979 NCAA Division II Football Championship playoffs were the sixth single-elimination tournament to determine the national champion of men's NCAA Division II college football. The championship game was held at University Stadium in Albuquerque, NM for the first time. With the game being played in New Mexico for the next two years, it was deemed the Zia Bowl.

=== Playoff bracket ===
First round Campus sites
Delaware	58
Virginia Union	28
Mississippi College	35
North Dakota	15
Youngstown State	51
South Dakota State	7
Alabama A&M	27
Morgan State	7

Semifinals; Campus sites
Delaware	60
Mississippi College	10
Youngstown State	52
Alabama A&M	0

Championship; University Stadium; Albuquerque, NM
Delaware	38
Youngstown State	21

== See also ==
- 1979 NCAA Division I-A football season
- 1979 NCAA Division I-AA football season
- 1979 NCAA Division III football season
- 1979 NAIA Division I football season
- 1979 NAIA Division II football season
