= 1979 Chico State Wildcats football team =

American college football season

1979 Chico State Wildcats football
- Conference: Far Western Conference
- Record: 5–6 (2–3 FWC)
- Head coach: Dick Trimmer (6th season)
- Defensive coordinator: Mike Clemons (1st season)
- Home stadium: University Stadium

1979 Far Western Conference football standings
	Conf.					Overall
Team	W		L		T	W		L		T
UC Davis $	5	–	0	–	0	7	–	2	–	1
Humboldt State	4	–	1	–	0	8	–	2	–	0
Chico State	2	–	3	–	0	5	–	6	–	0
Sacramento State	2	–	3	–	0	4	–	6	–	0
San Francisco State	1	–	4	–	0	3	–	7	–	0
Cal State Hayward	1	–	4	–	0	2	–	8	–	0
$ – Conference champion; Adjusted for Cal Poly Pomona forfeits to UC Davis and Sacramento State

The 1979 Chico State Wildcats football team represented California State University, Chico as a member of the Far Western Conference (FWC) during the 1979 NCAA Division II football season. Led by sixth-year head coach Dick Trimmer, Chico State compiled an overall record of 5–6 with a mark of 2–3 in conference play, placing fourth in the FWC. The team was outscored by its opponents 234 to 150 for the season. The Wildcats played home games at University Stadium in Chico, California.

== Schedule ==
Date	Opponent	Site	Result	Attendance	Source
September 8	at Puget Sound*	Baker Stadium; Tacoma, WA	L 7–16		
September 15	Willamette*	University Stadium; Chico, CA	W 24–22		
September 22	United States International*	University Stadium; Chico, CA	W 14–9		
September 29	Cal State Northridge*	University Stadium; Chico, CA	W 20–17		
October 6	Santa Clara*	University Stadium; Chico, CA	L 7–49		
October 13	at Saint Mary's*	Saint Mary's Stadium; Moraga, CA	L 7–25	2,183	
October 20	at Cal State Hayward	Pioneer Stadium; Hayward, CA	W 7–0	724	
October 27	Sacramento State	University Stadium; Chico, CA	W 41–21	2,120	
November 3	Humboldt State	University Stadium; Chico, CA	L 6–21	1,500	
November 10	at UC Davis	Toomey Field; Davis, CA	L 10–35	8,400	
November 17	San Francisco State	University Stadium; Chico, CA	L 7–19	1,000	
*Non-conference game
