= 1979 South Carolina State Bulldogs football team =

American college football season

1979 South Carolina State Bulldogs football

Gold Bowl, W 39–7 vs. Norfolk State
- Conference: Mid-Eastern Athletic Conference
- Record: 8–3 (4–1 MEAC)
- Head coach: Bill Davis (1st season)
- Home stadium: State College Stadium

1979 Mid-Eastern Athletic Conference football standings
	Conf.					Overall
Team	W		L		T	W		L		T
Morgan State $	5	–	0	–	0	9	–	2	–	0
South Carolina State	4	–	1	–	0	8	–	3	–	0
North Carolina A&T	2	–	2	–	1	4	–	6	–	1
Howard	2	–	3	–	0	5	–	6	–	0
Delaware State	1	–	4	–	1	4	–	5	–	1
North Carolina Central	1	–	4	–	0	2	–	8	–	1
Maryland Eastern Shore	0	–	0	–	0	3	–	7	–	1
$ – Conference champion; Maryland Eastern Shore games did not count as conference games in 1979

The 1979 South Carolina State Bulldogs football team represented South Carolina State College (now known as South Carolina State University) as a member of the Mid-Eastern Athletic Conference (MEAC) during the 1979 NCAA Division I-AA football season. Led by first-year head coach Bill Davis, the Bulldogs compiled an overall record of 8–3, with a mark of 4–1 in conference play, and finished second in the MEAC.

== Schedule ==
Date	Opponent	Site	Result	Attendance	Source
September 1	at Virginia State*	City Stadium; Richmond, VA	W 28–0	5,000	
September 8	Delaware State	State College Stadium; Orangeburg, SC	W 52–6		
September 15	North Carolina A&T	State College Stadium; Orangeburg, SC (rivalry)	W 23–3		
September 22	Howard	State College Stadium; Orangeburg, SC	W 55–17	6,041	
September 29	at Alcorn State*	Henderson Stadium; Lorman, MS	L 9–20		
October 6	at Johnson C. Smith*	American Legion Memorial Stadium; Charlotte, NC	W 23–6	4,437	
October 13	No. 8 (D-II) Morgan State	State College Stadium; Orangeburg, SC	L 16–27	6,200–8,000	
October 27	vs. North Carolina Central	Johnson Hagood Stadium; Charleston, SC (Port City Classic)	W 26–6	13,000	
November 3	Morris Brown*	State College Stadium; Orangeburg, SC	W 41–14	12,855	
November 10	No. 1 Grambling State*	State College Stadium; Orangeburg, SC	L 15–22	13,097	
December 1	vs. Norfolk State*	City Stadium; Richmond, VA (Gold Bowl)	W 39–7	8,000	
*Non-conference game; Rankings from AP Poll released prior to the game
