= 1979 Middle Tennessee Blue Raiders football team =

American college football season

1979 Middle Tennessee Blue Raiders football
- Conference: Ohio Valley Conference
- Record: 1–9 (1–5 OVC)
- Head coach: Boots Donnelly (1st season)
- Home stadium: Horace Jones Field

1979 Ohio Valley Conference football standings
	Conf.					Overall
Team	W		L		T	W		L		T
No. 2 Murray State $^	6	–	0	–	0	9	–	2	–	1
No. 3 Eastern Kentucky ^	5	–	1	–	0	11	–	2	–	0
Morehead State	3	–	2	–	1	5	–	4	–	1
Western Kentucky	3	–	3	–	0	5	–	5	–	0
Austin Peay	2	–	4	–	0	7	–	4	–	0
Middle Tennessee	1	–	5	–	0	1	–	9	–	0
Tennessee Tech	0	–	5	–	1	1	–	8	–	2
$ – Conference champion; ^ – NCAA Division I-AA playoff participant; Rankings from Associated Press poll

The 1979 Middle Tennessee Blue Raiders football team represented Middle Tennessee State University in the 1979 NCAA Division I-AA football season

== Schedule ==
Date	Opponent	Site	Result	Attendance	Source
September 8	North Alabama*	Horace Jones Field; Murfreesboro, TN	L 17–20		
September 15	at Tennessee–Martin*	Pacer Stadium; Martin, TN	L 23–31		
September 22	at Morehead State	Jayne Stadium; Morehead, KY	L 7–28	3,000	
October 6	No. T–7 Eastern Kentucky	Horace Jones Field; Murfreesboro, TN	L 10–52		
October 13	Murray State	Horace Jones Field; Murfreesboro, TN	L 8–29		
October 20	at Chattanooga*	Chamberlain Field; Chattanooga, TN	L 15–59	10,000	
October 27	at Austin Peay	Horace Jones Field; Murfreesboro, TN	L 14–31		
November 3	Western Kentucky	Horace Jones Field; Murfreesboro, TN	L 12–17	8,000	
November 10	at East Tennessee State*	Memorial Center; Johnson City, TN	L 14–52	10,027	
November 17	Tennessee Tech	Horace Jones Field; Murfreesboro, TN	W 17–14		
*Non-conference game; Rankings from Associated Press Poll released prior to the game
