= 1979 UC Davis Aggies football team =

American college football season

1979 UC Davis Aggies football

FWC champion
- Conference: Far Western Conference
- Record: 7–2–1 (5–0 FWC)
- Head coach: Jim Sochor (10th season)
- Home stadium: Toomey Field

1979 Far Western Conference football standings
	Conf.					Overall
Team	W		L		T	W		L		T
UC Davis $	5	–	0	–	0	7	–	2	–	1
Humboldt State	4	–	1	–	0	8	–	2	–	0
Chico State	2	–	3	–	0	5	–	6	–	0
Sacramento State	2	–	3	–	0	4	–	6	–	0
San Francisco State	1	–	4	–	0	3	–	7	–	0
Cal State Hayward	1	–	4	–	0	2	–	8	–	0
$ – Conference champion; Adjusted for Cal Poly Pomona forfeits to UC Davis and Sacramento State

The 1979 UC Davis Aggies football team represented the University of California, Davis as a member of the Far Western Conference (FWC) during the 1979 NCAA Division II football season. Led by tenth-year head coach Jim Sochor, UC Davis finished the season with an overall record of 6–3–1 and a mark of 5–0 in conference play, winning the FWC title for the ninth consecutive season. 1979 was the tenth consecutive winning season for the Aggies. With the 5–0 conference record, they stretched their conference winning streak to 33 games dating back to the 1973 season. The team outscored its opponents 217 to 155 for the season. The Aggies played home games at Toomey Field in Davis, California.

After the season, Cal Poly Pomona, who beat UC Davis in a non-conference game, had to forfeit all their victories because the team had used ineligible players during the season. With the forfeit, the Aggies' overall record improve to 7–2–1.

== Schedule ==
Date	Opponent	Site	Result	Attendance	Source
September 15	Cal Lutheran*	Toomey Field; Davis, CA	T 12–12	7,000	
September 22	No. T–10 Nevada*	Toomey Field; Davis, CA	L 21–28	9,000	
September 29	at Cal Poly*	Mustang Stadium; San Luis Obispo, CA (rivalry)	L 10–31	7,277	
October 6	Sacramento State	Toomey Field; Davis, CA (rivalry)	W 32–7	9,000	
October 13	at Humboldt State	Redwood Bowl; Arcata, CA	W 24–13	5,500	
October 20	at Cal Poly Pomona*	Kellogg Field; Pomona, CA	W 21–24 (forfeit win)	1,700–2,500	
October 27	San Francisco State	Toomey Field; Davis, CA	W 22–9	4,800–5,000	
November 3	at Santa Clara*	Buck Shaw Stadium; Santa Clara, CA	W 23–21	6,200	
November 10	Chico State	Toomey Field; Davis, CA	W 35–10	8,400	
November 17	at Cal State Hayward	Pioneer Stadium; Hayward, CA	W 17–0	650–966	
*Non-conference game; Rankings from Associated Press Poll released prior to the game

== NFL draft ==
The following UC Davis Aggies players were selected in the 1980 NFL draft.

Player	Position	Round	Overall	NFL team
Jeff Allen	Defensive back	8	212	Miami Dolphins
