= Charles Henderson (American football) =

American football coach

Biographical details
- Born: December 17, 1946 (age 79)

Coaching career (HC unless noted)
- 1976–1978: Delaware State (assistant)
- 1979–1980: Delaware State

Head coaching record
- Overall: 6–14–1

Charles Henderson (born December 18, 1946) is an American former college football coach. He served as the head football coach from 1979 to 1980 at Delaware State College—now known as Delaware State University—a historically black college in Dover, Delaware. He compiled a 6–14–1 record in two seasons as head coach after several seasons as an assistant under head coach Ed Wyche. Henderson was embroiled in a lawsuit against Delaware State that advanced to United States District Court when he was involved in an extramarital affair with a female employee who was fired when she became pregnant for violating unwritten moral clauses. The female employee won the lawsuit and was reinstated.

== Head coaching record ==
| Year | Team | Overall | Conference | Standing | Bowl/playoffs |
|---|---|---|---|---|---|
Delaware State Hornets (Mid-Eastern Athletic Conference) (1979–1980)
| 1979 | Delaware State | 4–5–1 | 1–4–1 | 5th | |
| 1980 | Delaware State | 2–9 | 0–5 | 6th | |
| Delaware State: | | 6–14–1 | 1–9–1 | | |
| Total: | | 6–14–1 | | | |
