= 1979 Cal State Hayward Pioneers football team =

American college football season

1979 Cal State Hayward Pioneers football
- Conference: Far Western Conference
- Record: 2–8 (1–4 FWC)
- Head coach: Tim Tierney (5th season)
- Home stadium: Pioneer Stadium

1979 Far Western Conference football standings
| | Conf. | | | | | Overall |
| Team | W | | L | | T | W | | L | | T |
|---|---|---|---|---|---|---|---|---|---|---|
| UC Davis $ | 5 | – | 0 | – | 0 | 7 | – | 2 | – | 1 |
| Humboldt State | 4 | – | 1 | – | 0 | 8 | – | 2 | – | 0 |
| Chico State | 2 | – | 3 | – | 0 | 5 | – | 6 | – | 0 |
| Sacramento State | 2 | – | 3 | – | 0 | 4 | – | 6 | – | 0 |
| San Francisco State | 1 | – | 4 | – | 0 | 3 | – | 7 | – | 0 |
| Cal State Hayward | 1 | – | 4 | – | 0 | 2 | – | 8 | – | 0 |
$ – Conference champion; Adjusted for Cal Poly Pomona forfeits to UC Davis and Sacramento State

The 1979 Cal State Hayward Pioneers football team represented California State University, Hayward—now known as California State University, East Bay—as a member of the Far Western Conference (FWC) during the 1979 NCAA Division II football season. Led by fifth-year head coach Tim Tierney, Cal State Hayward compiled an overall record of 2–8 with a mark of 1–4 in conference play, tying for fifth place the FWC. The team was outscored by its opponents 203 to 90 for the season. The Pioneers played home games at Pioneer Stadium in Hayward, California.

== Schedule ==
| Date | Time | Opponent | Site | Result | Attendance | Source |
|---|---|---|---|---|---|---|
| September 15 | | at Cal State Northridge* | North Campus Stadium; Northridge, CA | L 8–10 | 2,500 | |
| September 22 | | Santa Clara* | Pioneer Stadium; Hayward, CA | L 7–48 | 1,242 | |
| September 29 | | at Saint Mary's* | Saint Mary's Stadium; Moraga, CA | W 17–10 | | |
| October 6 | | at San Francisco State | Cox Stadium; San Francisco, CA | W 15–14 | 3,012 | |
| October 13 | | Eastern Washington* | Pioneer Stadium; Hayward, CA | L 22–24 | 680 | |
| October 20 | | Chico State | Pioneer Stadium; Hayward, CA | L 0–7 | 724 | |
| October 27 | 7:30 p.m. | at United States International* | San Diego Stadium; San Diego, CA | L 21–24 | | |
| November 3 | | at Sacramento State | Hornet Stadium; Sacramento, CA | L 0–14 | 700 | |
| November 10 | | Humboldt State | Pioneer Stadium; Hayward, CA | L 0–35 | 685 | |
| November 17 | | UC Davis | Pioneer Stadium; Hayward, CA | L 0–17 | 650–966 | |
*Non-conference game; All times are in Pacific time
