= 1979 South Dakota Coyotes football team =

American college football season

1979 South Dakota Coyotes football
- Conference: North Central Conference
- Record: 5–6 (3–3 NCC)
- Head coach: Dave Triplett (1st season)
- Home stadium: Inman Field/DakotaDome

1979 North Central Conference football standings
	Conf.					Overall
Team	W		L		T	W		L		T
No. 3 North Dakota $^	5	–	1	–	0	10	–	2	–	0
No. 8 South Dakota State * ^	4	–	2	–	0	9	–	3	–	0
North Dakota State	4	–	2	–	0	6	–	4	–	0
Nebraska–Omaha	3	–	3	–	0	8	–	3	–	0
South Dakota *	3	–	3	–	0	5	–	6	–	0
Augustana (SD)	2	–	4	–	0	4	–	5	–	0
Morningside	0	–	6	–	0	0	–	10	–	0
Northern Colorado †	0	–	0	–	0	2	–	8	–	0
$ – Conference champion; ^ – NCAA Division II playoff participant; * – South Dakota State won two head-to-head games over South Dakota, which counted as one game for each team in the conference standings. † – Northern Colorado was ineligible for the conference title.; Rankings from AP Poll

The 1979 South Dakota Coyotes football team represented the University of South Dakotaas a member of the North Central Conference (NCC) during the 1979 NCAA Division II football season. Led by first-year head coach Dave Triplett, the Coyotes compiled an overall record of 5–6 with a mark of 3–3 in conference play, tying for fourth place in the NCC. South Dakota and South Dakota State played two head-to-head games, both won by the Jackrabbits, which counted as one loss for South Dakota and one win for South Dakota State in the conference standings.

== Schedule ==
Date	Opponent	Rank	Site	Result	Attendance	Source
September 1	at Eastern Illinois*		O'Brien Field; Charleston, IL	L 15–24	8,000	
September 8	St. Thomas (MN)*		Inman Field; Vermillion, SD	W 22–6	6,800	
September 15	Northeast Missouri State*		Inman Field; Vermillion, SD	W 35–10	4,900	
September 22	North Dakota State		Inman Field; Vermillion, SD	W 29–28	7,300	
September 29	at Morningside		Roberts Field; Sioux City, IA	W 24–8	3,500	
October 6	at South Dakota State	No. 5	Coughlin–Alumni Stadium; Brookings, SD (rivalry)	L 21–26	12,007	
October 13	at Augustana (SD)		Sioux Falls, SD	L 6–7	5,010	
October 20	at No. 3 North Dakota		Memorial Stadium; Grand Forks, ND (Sitting Bull Trophy)	L 22–23	11,050	
October 27	Nebraska–Omaha		Inman Field; Vermillion, SD	W 23–17	10,500	
November 3	Northern Iowa*		Inman Field; Vermillion, SD	L 9–23	6,200	
November 10	No. 8 South Dakota State		DakotaDome; Vermillion, SD	L 28–33	9,200	
*Non-conference game; Rankings from AP Poll released prior to the game
