= 1979 Western Kentucky Hilltoppers football team =

American college football season

1979 Western Kentucky Hilltoppers football
- Conference: Ohio Valley Conference
- Record: 5–5 (3–3 OVC)
- Head coach: Jimmy Feix (12th season)
- Home stadium: L. T. Smith Stadium

1979 Ohio Valley Conference football standings
	Conf.					Overall
Team	W		L		T	W		L		T
No. 2 Murray State $^	6	–	0	–	0	9	–	2	–	1
No. 3 Eastern Kentucky ^	5	–	1	–	0	11	–	2	–	0
Morehead State	3	–	2	–	1	5	–	4	–	1
Western Kentucky	3	–	3	–	0	5	–	5	–	0
Austin Peay	2	–	4	–	0	7	–	4	–	0
Middle Tennessee	1	–	5	–	0	1	–	9	–	0
Tennessee Tech	0	–	5	–	1	1	–	8	–	2
$ – Conference champion; ^ – NCAA Division I-AA playoff participant; Rankings from Associated Press poll

The 1979 Western Kentucky Hilltoppers football team represented Western Kentucky University as a member of the Ohio Valley Conference (OVC) during the 1979 NCAA Division I-AA football season. Led by 12th-year head coach Jimmy Feix, the Hilltoppers compiled an overall record of 5–5 with a mark of 3–3 on conference play, placing fourth in the OVC.

== Schedule ==
Date	Opponent	Site	Result	Attendance	Source
September 8	at Chattanooga*	Chamberlain Field; Chattanooga, TN	L 28–41	10,250	
September 15	Lamar*	L. T. Smith Stadium; Bowling Green, KY	L 27–58	14,600	
September 22	at No. 8 Austin Peay	Municipal Stadium; Clarksville, TN	W 24–20	9,000	
October 6	Northern Michigan*	L. T. Smith Stadium; Bowling Green, KY	W 28–21	14,000	
October 13	Tennessee Tech	L. T. Smith Stadium; Bowling Green, KY	W 49–7	13,200	
October 20	at No. 3 Eastern Kentucky	Hanger Field; Richmond, KY (rivalry)	L 6–8	25,300	
October 27	Morehead State	L. T. Smith Stadium; Bowling Green, KY	L 0–3	19,800	
November 3	at Middle Tennessee	Horace Jones Field; Murfreesboro, TN (rivalry)	W 17–12	8,000	
November 10	at Northern Iowa*	UNI-Dome; Cedar Falls, IA	W 24–17	12,500	
November 17	No. 2 Murray State	L. T. Smith Stadium; Bowling Green, KY (rivalry)	L 20–30	15,500	
*Non-conference game; Rankings from AP Poll released prior to the game
