= 1979 Northern Iowa Panthers football team =

American college football season

1979 Northern Iowa Panthers football
- Conference: Association of Mid-Continent Universities
- Record: 6–5 (4–1 Mid-Con)
- Head coach: Stan Sheriff (20th season)
- Defensive coordinator: Dennis Remmert (9th season)
- Home stadium: UNI-Dome

1979 Association of Mid-Continent Universities football standings
	Conf.					Overall
Team	W		L		T	W		L		T
No. 2 Youngstown State $^	5	–	0	–	0	11	–	2	–	0
Northern Iowa	4	–	1	–	0	6	–	5	–	0
Akron	3	–	2	–	0	6	–	5	–	0
Eastern Illinois	1	–	4	–	0	7	–	4	–	0
Northern Michigan	1	–	4	–	0	4	–	6	–	0
Western Illinois	1	–	4	–	0	3	–	8	–	0
$ – Conference champion; ^ – NCAA Division II playoff participant; Rankings from NCAA Division II AP Poll

The 1979 Northern Iowa Panthers football team was an American football team that represented the University of Northern Iowa as a member of the Association of Mid-Continent Universities (Mid-Con) during the 1979 NCAA Division II football season. In its 20th season under head coach Stan Sheriff, the team compiled a 6–5 record (4–1 in conference games) and finished in second place out six teams in the Mid-Con.

The team's statistical leaders included junior tailback Kelly Ellis (1,093 rushing yards), sophomore quarterback Steve Sandon (797 passing yards), junior wide receiver Kenny McNeal (330 receiving yards), and junior running back Mark Fullbright (50 points scored). Three Northern Iowa players received first-team honors on the 1979 all-Mid-Con football team: Ellis; defensive tackle Owen Dockter; and defensive back Danny Todd. Five others were named to the second team. Ellis set an NCAA single-game record with 382 rushing yards against Western Illinois, breaking the prior record of 373 yards set in 1959 by Dallas Garber. On special teams, Ed Stratton set a school record (broken in 2012) with four blocked kicks.

The team played its home games at the UNI-Dome in Cedar Falls, Iowa.

== Schedule ==
Date	Opponent	Site	Result	Attendance	Source
September 3	Minnesota Morris*	UNI-Dome; Cedar Falls, IA	L 0–13	11,000	
September 8	at Northern Michigan	Marquette, MI	W 11–7	6,658	
September 15	North Dakota State*	UNI-Dome; Cedar Falls, IA	W 21–10	9,500	
September 22	Nebraska–Omaha*	UNI-Dome; Cedar Falls, IA	L 15–39	10,000	
September 29	at No. T–4 Youngstown State	Youngstown, OH	L 0–29	7,000	
October 6	Akron	UNI-Dome; Cedar Falls, IA	W 20–17	9,500	
October 13	at Western Illinois	Hanson Field; Macomb, IL	W 38–25	11,596–11,597	
October 20	at No. 9 South Dakota State*	Coughlin–Alumni Stadium; Brookings, SD	L 7–14	2,415	
October 27	No. 4 Eastern Illinois	UNI-Dome; Cedar Falls, IA	W 10–7	10,700–10,780	
November 3	at South Dakota*	DakotaDome; Vermillion, SD	W 23–9	6,200	
November 10	Western Kentucky*	UNI-Dome; Cedar Falls, IA	L 17–24	12,500	
*Non-conference game; Rankings from Associated Press Poll released prior to the game

== Roster ==
1979 Northern Iowa Panthers football team roster
Players
Coaches
Offense

Pos.	#	Name	Class
QB	7	Dave Chambers	Fr
WR	86	Kelson Roby	Jr
QB	12	Steve Sandon	So
OT	76	Steve Wright	Jr

Defense

Pos.	#	Name	Class
LB	37	Ed Arnold	Sr
DT	75	Owen Dockter	Jr
DT	98	Jake Schoenenberger	Sr

Special teams

Pos.	#	Name	Class

Head coach

- Stan Sheriff

Coordinators/assistant coaches

Legend

- (C) Team captain
- (S) Suspended
- (I) Ineligible
- Injured
- Redshirt
