= 1979 San Francisco State Gators football team =

American college football season

1979 San Francisco State Gators football
- Conference: Far Western Conference
- Record: 3–7 (1–4 FWC)
- Head coach: Vic Rowen (19th season)
- Home stadium: Cox Stadium

1979 Far Western Conference football standings
	Conf.					Overall
Team	W		L		T	W		L		T
UC Davis $	5	–	0	–	0	7	–	2	–	1
Humboldt State	4	–	1	–	0	8	–	2	–	0
Chico State	2	–	3	–	0	5	–	6	–	0
Sacramento State	2	–	3	–	0	4	–	6	–	0
San Francisco State	1	–	4	–	0	3	–	7	–	0
Cal State Hayward	1	–	4	–	0	2	–	8	–	0
$ – Conference champion; Adjusted for Cal Poly Pomona forfeits to UC Davis and Sacramento State

The 1979 San Francisco State Gators football team represented San Francisco State University as a member of the Far Western Conference (FWC) during the 1979 NCAA Division II football season. Led by 19th-year head coach Vic Rowen, San Francisco State finished the season with an overall record of 3–7 and a mark of 1–4 in conference play, tying for fifth place in the FWC with Cal State Hayward. For the season the team was outscored by its opponents 201 to 108. The Gators played home games at Cox Stadium in San Francisco.

== Schedule ==
Date	Opponent	Site	Result	Attendance	Source
September 8	at Cal State Northridge*	Devonshire Downs; Northridge, CA	W 17–14	2,950	
September 15	at Santa Clara*	Buck Shaw Stadium; Santa Clara, CA	L 0–36	6,410	
September 22	at Cal Poly Pomona*	Kellogg Field; Pomona, CA	W 17–6	3,000	
September 28	at United States International*	Balboa Stadium?; San Diego, CA	L 3–26	622	
October 6	Cal State Hayward	Cox Stadium; San Francisco, CA	L 14–15	3,012	
October 13	at Sacramento State	Hornet Stadium; Sacramento, CA	L 6–14	2,000	
October 20	Humboldt State	Cox Stadium; San Francisco, CA	L 13–24	2,000–2,834	
October 27	at UC Davis	Toomey Field; Davis, CA	L 9–22	4,800–5,000	
November 3	Portland State*	Cox Stadium; San Francisco, CA	L 10–37	1,000	
November 17	at Chico State	University Stadium; Chico, CA	W 19–7	1,000	
*Non-conference game
