= 1979 Cal Poly Mustangs football team =

American college football season

1979 Cal Poly Mustangs football

CCAA champion
- Conference: California Collegiate Athletic Association

Ranking
- AP: No. 7 (NCAA Division II)
- Record: 7–3 (2–0 CCAA)
- Head coach: Joe Harper (12th season)
- Home stadium: Mustang Stadium

1979 California Collegiate Athletic Association football standings
	Conf.					Overall
Team	W		L		T	W		L		T
No. 7 Cal Poly $	2	–	0	–	0	7	–	3	–	0
Cal State Northridge	1	–	1	–	0	3	–	7	–	0
Cal Poly Pomona	0	–	2	–	0	0	–	11	–	0
$ – Conference champion; Rankings from NCAA Division II AP Poll

The 1979 Cal Poly Mustangs football team represented California Polytechnic State University, San Luis Obispo as a member of the California Collegiate Athletic Association (CCAA) during the 1979 NCAA Division II football season. Led by 12th-year head coach Joe Harper, Cal Poly compiled an overall record of 7–3 with a mark of 2–0 in conference play, winning the CCAA title for the fourth consecutive season. The Mustangs played home games at Mustang Stadium in San Luis Obispo, California.

== Schedule ==
Date	Opponent	Rank	Site	Result	Attendance	Source
September 15	at Pacific (CA)*		Pacific Memorial Stadium; Stockton, CA	L 17–31	17,600–19,385	
September 22	Adams State*		Mustang Stadium; San Luis Obispo, CA	W 45–6	5,180	
September 29	UC Davis*		Mustang Stadium; San Luis Obispo, CA (rivalry)	W 31–10	7,277	
October 6	Fresno State*		Mustang Stadium; San Luis Obispo, CA	W 26–0	8,680	
October 13	Northern Colorado*	No. 9	Mustang Stadium; San Luis Obispo, CA	W 17–3	8,150	
October 20	at Cal State Northridge	No. 8	Devonshire Downs; Northridge, CA	W 38–20	5,000	
October 27	at Portland State*	No. 7	Civic Stadium; Portland, OR	W 45–42	4,097	
November 3	at Puget Sound*	No. 5	Baker Stadium; Tacoma, WA	L 21–28	4,000–4,300	
November 10	Cal Poly Pomona	No. 7	Mustang Stadium; San Luis Obispo, CA	W 38–34	5,520	
November 17	at Boise State*	No. 7	Bronco Stadium; Boise, ID	L 14–56	17,257	
*Non-conference game; Rankings from Associated Press Poll released prior to the game
