= 1979 Eastern Kentucky Colonels football team =

American college football season

1979 Eastern Kentucky Colonels football

NCAA Division I-AA champion

NCAA Division I-AA Championship Game, W 30–7 vs Lehigh
- Conference: Ohio Valley Conference

Ranking
- AP: No. 1
- Record: 11–2 (5–1 OVC)
- Head coach: Roy Kidd (16th season)
- Home stadium: Hanger Field

1979 Ohio Valley Conference football standings
	Conf.					Overall
Team	W		L		T	W		L		T
No. 2 Murray State $^	6	–	0	–	0	9	–	2	–	1
No. 3 Eastern Kentucky ^	5	–	1	–	0	11	–	2	–	0
Morehead State	3	–	2	–	1	5	–	4	–	1
Western Kentucky	3	–	3	–	0	5	–	5	–	0
Austin Peay	2	–	4	–	0	7	–	4	–	0
Middle Tennessee	1	–	5	–	0	1	–	9	–	0
Tennessee Tech	0	–	5	–	1	1	–	8	–	2
$ – Conference champion; ^ – NCAA Division I-AA playoff participant; Rankings from Associated Press poll

The 1979 Eastern Kentucky Colonels football team represented Eastern Kentucky University in the 1979 NCAA Division I-AA football season. They competed as a member of the Ohio Valley Conference and played their home games at Hanger Field in Richmond, Kentucky. Head coach Roy Kidd was in his 16th season leading the Colonels.

The team advanced to the 1979 NCAA Division I-AA Football Championship Game, where they defeated Lehigh, 30–7. After the championship win, Governor John Y. Brown Jr. declared the week of January 20–26, 1980, as "EKU National Football Champions Week" in the state.

== Schedule ==
Date	Opponent	Rank	Site	TV	Result	Attendance	Source
September 8	at Kent State*		Dix Stadium; Kent, OH		W 17–14	11,045	
September 15	Troy State*		Hanger Field; Richmond, KY		W 15–0	15,200	
September 22	at East Tennessee State*	No. 5	Memorial Center; Johnson City, TN		L 20–27	9,361	
September 29	Austin Peay	No. 7	Hanger Field; Richmond, KY		W 35–10	12,800	
October 6	at Middle Tennessee	No. 7	Horace Jones Field; Murfreesboro, TN		W 52–10		
October 13	Cal State Fullerton*	No. 7	Hanger Field; Richmond, KY		W 33–17	10,100	
October 20	Western Kentucky^{†}	No. 3	Hanger Field; Richmond, KY (rivalry)		W 8–6	25,300	
October 27	No. 8 Murray State	No. 1	Roy Stewart Stadium; Murray, KY		L 7–24	16,000	
November 3	Tennessee Tech	No. 5	Hanger Field; Richmond, KY		W 35–0		
November 10	No. 2 Jackson State*	No. 5	Hanger Field; Richmond, KY		W 27–21		
November 17	at Morehead State	No. 4	Jayne Stadium; Morehead, KY (Old Hawg Rifle)		W 34–7	9,600	
December 8	No. 1 Nevada*	No. 3	Hanger Field; Richmond, KY (NCAA Division I-AA Semifinal)		W 33–30 ^{2OT}	5,100	
December 15	vs. No. 4 Lehigh*	No. 3	Orlando Stadium; Orlando, FL (NCAA Division I-AA Championship Game)	ABC	W 30–7	5,200	
*Non-conference game; ^{†}Homecoming; Rankings from AP Poll released prior to the game
