= 1979 Delaware State Hornets football team =

American college football season

1979 Delaware State Hornets football
- Conference: Mid-Eastern Athletic Conference
- Record: 4–5–1 (1–4–1 MEAC)
- Head coach: Charles Henderson (1st season)
- Home stadium: Alumni Stadium

1979 Mid-Eastern Athletic Conference football standings
	Conf.					Overall
Team	W		L		T	W		L		T
Morgan State $	5	–	0	–	0	9	–	2	–	0
South Carolina State	4	–	1	–	0	8	–	3	–	0
North Carolina A&T	2	–	2	–	1	4	–	6	–	1
Howard	2	–	3	–	0	5	–	6	–	0
Delaware State	1	–	4	–	1	4	–	5	–	1
North Carolina Central	1	–	4	–	0	2	–	8	–	1
Maryland Eastern Shore	0	–	0	–	0	3	–	7	–	1
$ – Conference champion; Maryland Eastern Shore games did not count as conference games in 1979

The 1979 Delaware State Hornets football team represented Delaware State College (now known as Delaware State University) as a member of the Mid-Eastern Athletic Conference (MEAC) during the 1979 NCAA Division I-AA football season. Led by first-year head coach Charles Henderson, the Hornets compiled an overall record of 4–5–1, with a mark of 1–4–1 in conference play, and finished fifth in the MEAC.

== Schedule ==
Date	Opponent	Site	Result	Attendance	Source
September 8	at South Carolina State	State College Stadium; Orangeburg, SC	L 6–52		
September 15	Clarion State*	Alumni Stadium; Dover, DE	L 12–45		
September 29	at Maryland Eastern Shore	Princess Anne, MD	W 19–13		
October 6	Howard	Alumni Stadium; Dover, DE	L 0–23		
October 13	at North Carolina Central	O'Kelly Stadium; Durham, NC	L 26–31	13,500	
October 20	No. 7 Morgan State	Alumni Stadium; Dover, DE	L 0–22	1,500	
October 27	Kentucky State*	Alumni Stadium; Dover, DE	W 16–2		
November 3	Bethune–Cookman*	Alumni Stadium; Dover, DE	W 17–15	500	
November 10	North Carolina A&T	Alumni Stadium; Dover, DE	T 21–21		
November 17	at Livingstone*	Alumni Memorial Stadium; Salisbury, NC	W 26–10		
*Non-conference game; Rankings from AP Poll released prior to the game
