= 1979 Humboldt State Lumberjacks football team =

American college football season

1979 Humboldt State Lumberjacks football
- Conference: Far Western Conference
- Record: 8–2 (4–1 FWC)
- Head coach: Bud Van Deren (14th season)
- Home stadium: Redwood Bowl

1979 Far Western Conference football standings
	Conf.					Overall
Team	W		L		T	W		L		T
UC Davis $	5	–	0	–	0	7	–	2	–	1
Humboldt State	4	–	1	–	0	8	–	2	–	0
Chico State	2	–	3	–	0	5	–	6	–	0
Sacramento State	2	–	3	–	0	4	–	6	–	0
San Francisco State	1	–	4	–	0	3	–	7	–	0
Cal State Hayward	1	–	4	–	0	2	–	8	–	0
$ – Conference champion; Adjusted for Cal Poly Pomona forfeits to UC Davis and Sacramento State

The 1979 Humboldt State Lumberjacks football team represented Humboldt State University—now known as California State Polytechnic University, Humboldt—as a member of the Far Western Conference (FWC) during the 1979 NCAA Division II football season. Led by 14th-year head coach Bud Van Deren, the Lumberjacks compiled an overall record of 8–2 with a mark of 4–1 in conference play, placing second in the FWC. The team outscored its opponents 220 to 127 for the season. Humboldt State played home games at the Redwood Bowl in Arcata, California.

== Schedule ==
Date	Opponent	Site	Result	Attendance	Source
September 15	United States International*	Redwood Bowl; Arcata, CA	W 19–16	1,500	
September 22	at Cal State Northridge*	North Campus Stadium; Northridge, CA	L 14–18	3,500	
September 29	at Portland State*	Civic Stadium; Portland, OR	W 30–29	8,000–8,873	
October 6	Redlands*	Redwood Bowl; Arcata, CA	W 34–7	3,500	
October 13	UC Davis	Redwood Bowl; Arcata, CA	L 13–24	5,500	
October 20	at San Francisco State	Cox Stadium; San Francisco, CA	W 24–13	2,000–2,834	
October 27	Puget Sound*	Redwood Bowl; Arcata, CA	W 13–7	5,000	
November 3	at Chico State	University Stadium; Chico, CA	W 21–6	1,500	
November 10	at Cal State Hayward	Pioneer Stadium; Hayward, CA	W 35–0	2,000	
November 17	Sacramento State	Redwood Bowl; Arcata, CA	W 17–7	2,000–3,500	
*Non-conference game
