= 1979 Western Illinois Leathernecks football team =

American college football season

1979 Western Illinois Leathernecks football
- Conference: Association of Mid-Continent Universities
- Record: 3–8 (1–4 Mid-Con)
- Head coach: Pete Rodriguez (1st season)
- Home stadium: Hanson Field

1979 Association of Mid-Continent Universities football standings
	Conf.					Overall
Team	W		L		T	W		L		T
No. 2 Youngstown State $^	5	–	0	–	0	11	–	2	–	0
Northern Iowa	4	–	1	–	0	6	–	5	–	0
Akron	3	–	2	–	0	6	–	5	–	0
Eastern Illinois	1	–	4	–	0	7	–	4	–	0
Northern Michigan	1	–	4	–	0	4	–	6	–	0
Western Illinois	1	–	4	–	0	3	–	8	–	0
$ – Conference champion; ^ – NCAA Division II playoff participant; Rankings from NCAA Division II AP Poll

The 1979 Western Illinois Leathernecks football team represented Western Illinois University as a member of the Association of Mid-Continent Universities during the 1979 NCAA Division II football season. They were led by first-year head coach Pete Rodriguez and played their home games at Hanson Field.

== Schedule ==
Date	Time	Opponent	Site	Result	Attendance	Source
September 1		Wisconsin–Whitewater*	Hanson Field; Macomb, IL	W 12–7	9,400	
September 8		at Akron	Rubber Bowl; Akron, OH	L 7–24	32,113	
September 15	7:30 p.m.	Indiana State*	Hanson Field; Macomb, IL	L 14–17	7,549	
September 22		Saginaw Valley State*	Hanson Field; Macomb, IL	W 27–7	5,218	
September 29		at Northern Michigan	Marquette, MI	L 21–24	5,605	
October 6		at No. 1 Eastern Illinois	O'Brien Field; Charleston, IL	W 10–7	7,500	
October 13		Northern Iowa	Hanson Field; Macomb, IL	L 25–38	11,596–11,597	
October 20		at United States International*	San Diego, CA	L 7–14	1,300	
October 27		at Youngstown State	Stambaugh Stadium; Youngstown, OH	L 8–29	7,100	
November 3		at Illinois State*	Hancock Stadium; Normal, IL	L 7–35	13,397	
November 10		No. 3 North Dakota*	Hanson Field; Macomb, IL	L 7–28	8,300	
*Non-conference game; Rankings from Associated Press Poll released prior to the game; All times are in Central time

== Roster ==
1979 Western Illinois Leathernecks football team roster
Players			Coaches
Offense: Pos. / # / Name / Class; G / 72 / Don Greco / Jr	Defense: Pos. / # / Name / Class	Special teams: Pos. / # / Name / Class	Head coach: Pete Rodriguez; Coordinators/assistant coaches Legend: (C) Team captain; (S) Suspended; (I) Ineligible; Injured; Redshirt
