= 1979 North Dakota Fighting Sioux football team =

American college football season

1979 North Dakota Fighting Sioux football

NCC champion

NCAA Division II Quarterfinal, L 15–35 at Mississippi College
- Conference: North Central Conference
- Record: 10–2 (5–1 NCC)
- Head coach: Gene Murphy (2nd season)
- Home stadium: Memorial Stadium

1979 North Central Conference football standings
	Conf.					Overall
Team	W		L		T	W		L		T
No. 3 North Dakota $^	5	–	1	–	0	10	–	2	–	0
No. 8 South Dakota State * ^	4	–	2	–	0	9	–	3	–	0
North Dakota State	4	–	2	–	0	6	–	4	–	0
Nebraska–Omaha	3	–	3	–	0	8	–	3	–	0
South Dakota *	3	–	3	–	0	5	–	6	–	0
Augustana (SD)	2	–	4	–	0	4	–	5	–	0
Morningside	0	–	6	–	0	0	–	10	–	0
Northern Colorado †	0	–	0	–	0	2	–	8	–	0
$ – Conference champion; ^ – NCAA Division II playoff participant; * – South Dakota State won two head-to-head games over South Dakota, which counted as one game for each team in the conference standings. † – Northern Colorado was ineligible for the conference title.; Rankings from AP Poll

The 1979 North Dakota Fighting Sioux football team, also known as the Nodaks, was an American football team that represented the University of North Dakota as a member of the North Central Conference (NCC) during the 1979 NCAA Division II football season. Led by Gene Murphy in his second and final season as head coach, the Fighting Sioux compiled an overall record of 10–2 with a mark of 5–1 in conference play, winning the NCC title. North Dakota advanced to the NCAA Division II Football Championship playoffs, losing in the quarterfinals to Mississippi College. The team played home games at Memorial Stadium in Grand Forks, North Dakota.

== Schedule ==
Date	Time	Opponent	Rank	Site	Result	Attendance	Source
September 1		Moorhead State*		Memorial Stadium; Grand Forks, ND	W 17–0	6,300	
September 8		at Montana State*		Reno H. Sales Stadium; Bozeman, MT	W 20–16	7,070	
September 15		at Sacramento State*		Memorial Stadium; Grand Forks, ND	W 31–0	13,200	
September 22		at South Dakota State		Coughlin–Alumni Stadium; Brookings, SD	W 13–0	4,380	
September 29		Illinois State*	No. T–4	Memorial Stadium; Grand Forks, ND	W 13–0	5,700	
October 6		at Augustana (SD)	No. 3	Sioux Falls, SD	W 30–24	1,157	
October 13		at North Dakota State	No. 2	Dacotah Field; Fargo, ND (Nickel Trophy)	W 14–7	12,800	
October 20		South Dakota	No. 3	Memorial Stadium; Grand Forks, ND (Sitting Bull Trophy)	W 23–22	11,050	
October 27		Morningside	No. 3	Memorial Stadium; Grand Forks, ND	W 32–7	5,700	
November 3		at Nebraska–Omaha	No. 3	Al F. Caniglia Field; Omaha, NE	L 13–24	5,300	
November 10		at Western Illinois*	No. 3	Hanson Field; Macomb, IL	W 28–7	8,300	
November 24	7:30 p.m.	at No. 5 Mississippi College*	No. 3	Mississippi Memorial Stadium; Jackson, MS (NCAA Division II Quarterfinal)	L 15–35		
*Non-conference game; Rankings from AP Poll released prior to the game; All times are in Central time

== Roster ==
1979 North Dakota Fighting Sioux football team roster
Players
Coaches
Offense

Pos.	#	Name	Class
RB	33	Kirk Anderson	Jr
QB	15	Chris Sorensen	So
OT	74	Todd Thomas	Jr

Defense

Pos.	#	Name	Class
CB	13	Jim Abernathy	So
DT	80	Dale Markham	Sr

Special teams

Pos.	#	Name	Class

Head coach

- Gene Murphy

Coordinators/assistant coaches

Legend

- (C) Team captain
- (S) Suspended
- (I) Ineligible
- Injured
- Redshirt
