= 1979 Murray State Racers football team =

American college football season

1979 Murray State Racers football

OVC champion

NCAA Division I-AA Semifinal, L 9–28 vs. Lehigh
- Conference: Ohio Valley Conference
- Record: 9–2–1 (6–0 OVC)
- Head coach: Mike Gottfried (2nd season)
- Defensive coordinator: Frank Beamer (1st season)
- Home stadium: Roy Stewart Stadium

1979 Ohio Valley Conference football standings
	Conf.					Overall
Team	W		L		T	W		L		T
No. 2 Murray State $^	6	–	0	–	0	9	–	2	–	1
No. 3 Eastern Kentucky ^	5	–	1	–	0	11	–	2	–	0
Morehead State	3	–	2	–	1	5	–	4	–	1
Western Kentucky	3	–	3	–	0	5	–	5	–	0
Austin Peay	2	–	4	–	0	7	–	4	–	0
Middle Tennessee	1	–	5	–	0	1	–	9	–	0
Tennessee Tech	0	–	5	–	1	1	–	8	–	2
$ – Conference champion; ^ – NCAA Division I-AA playoff participant; Rankings from Associated Press poll

The 1979 Murray State Racers football team represented Murray State University during the 1979 NCAA Division I-AA football season. Led by second-year head coach Mike Gottfried, the Racers compiled an overall record of 9–2–1 with a mark of 6–0 on conference play, winning the OVC title. Murray State advanced to the NCAA Division I-AA Football Championship playoffs, where they lost to Lehigh in the semifinals.

== Schedule ==
Date	Opponent	Rank	Site	Result	Attendance	Source
September 1	at Southeast Missouri State*		Houck Stadium; Cape Girardeau, MO	T 21–21		
September 8	at Evansville*		Central Stadium; Evansville, IN	W 24–14	4,150	
September 15	Southeastern Louisiana*		Roy Stewart Stadium; Murray, KY	L 11–19		
September 22	Tennessee Tech		Roy Stewart Stadium; Murray, KY	W 24–3		
September 29	Morehead State		Roy Stewart Stadium; Murray, KY	W 31–7		
October 6	at Tennessee–Martin*		Pacer Stadium; Martin, TN	W 24–0	8,000	
October 13	at Middle Tennessee		Horace Jones Field; Murfreesboro, TN	W 29–8		
October 20	at Indiana Central*	No. 10	Key Stadium; Indianapolis, IN	W 21–7		
October 27	No. 1 Eastern Kentucky	No. 8	Roy Stewart Stadium; Murray, KY	W 24–7	16,000	
November 3	Austin Peay	No. 4	Roy Stewart Stadium; Murray, KY	W 24–10		
November 17	at Western Kentucky	No. 2	L. T. Smith Stadium; Bowling Green, KY (rivalry)	W 30–20		
December 8	No. 4 Lehigh*	No. 2	Roy Stewart Stadium; Murray, KY (NCAA Division I-AA Semifinal)	L 9–28	10,000	
*Non-conference game; Rankings from AP Poll released prior to the game
