= 1979 Eastern Illinois Panthers football team =

American college football season

1979 Eastern Illinois Panthers football
- Conference: Association of Mid-Continent Universities
- Record: 7–4 (1–4 Mid-Con)
- Head coach: Darrell Mudra (2nd season)
- Defensive coordinator: John Teerlinck (2nd season)
- Home stadium: O'Brien Stadium

1979 Association of Mid-Continent Universities football standings
	Conf.					Overall
Team	W		L		T	W		L		T
No. 2 Youngstown State $^	5	–	0	–	0	11	–	2	–	0
Northern Iowa	4	–	1	–	0	6	–	5	–	0
Akron	3	–	2	–	0	6	–	5	–	0
Eastern Illinois	1	–	4	–	0	7	–	4	–	0
Northern Michigan	1	–	4	–	0	4	–	6	–	0
Western Illinois	1	–	4	–	0	3	–	8	–	0
$ – Conference champion; ^ – NCAA Division II playoff participant; Rankings from NCAA Division II AP Poll

The 1979 Eastern Illinois Panthers football team represented Eastern Illinois University during the 1979 NCAA Division II football season, and completed the 78th season of Panther football. The Panthers played their home games at O'Brien Stadium in Charleston, Illinois.

== Schedule ==
Date	Opponent	Rank	Site	Result	Attendance	Source
September 1	South Dakota*		O'Brien Stadium; Charleston, IL	W 24–15	8,000	
September 8	Butler*		O'Brien Stadium; Charleston, IL	W 38–0	7,500	
September 15	Wayne State (MI)*		O'Brien Stadium; Charleston, IL	W 58–21	7,500	
September 22	at Northeast Missouri State*		Stokes Stadium; Kirksville, MO	W 46–3	5,500	
September 29	at Southern Illinois*	No. 1	McAndrew Stadium; Carbondale, IL	W 22–14	17,769	
October 6	Western Illinois	No. 1	O'Brien Stadium; Charleston, IL	L 7–10	7,500	
October 20	at Northern Michigan	No. 4	Superior Dome; Marquette, MI	W 38–21	10,000	
October 27	at Northern Iowa	No. 4	UNI-Dome; Cedar Falls, IA	L 7–10	10,700–10,780	
November 3	No. 2 Youngstown State	No. 8	O'Brien Stadium; Charleston, IL	L 21–49	12,000	
November 10	at Illinois State*		Hancock Stadium; Normal, IL (rivalry)	W 24–0	10,272	
November 17	Akron		O'Brien Stadium; Charleston, IL	L 16–27	6,500	
*Non-conference game; Rankings from Associated Press Poll released prior to the game

== Roster ==
1979 Eastern Illinois Panthers football team roster
Players
Coaches
Offense

Pos.	#	Name	Class
QB	11	Steve Turk	Sr
C	50	Jack Lafferty	Sr

Defense

Pos.	#	Name	Class
CB	44	Rich Brown	So
FS	48	Chris Merenowicz	Jr
DE	79	Steve Parker	Jr
LB	12	Don Pittman	Jr

Special teams

Pos.	#	Name	Class

Head coach

- Darrell Mudra

Coordinators/assistant coaches

Legend

- (C) Team captain
- (S) Suspended
- (I) Ineligible
- Injured
- Redshirt
