= 1979 Morgan State Bears football team =

American college football season

1979 Morgan State Bears football

MEAC champion

NCAA Division II quarterfinal, L 7–27 at Alabama A&M
- Conference: Mid-Eastern Athletic Conference

Ranking
- AP: No. 4
- Record: 9–2 (5–0 MEAC)
- Head coach: Clarence Thomas (2nd season)
- Home stadium: Hughes Stadium

1979 Mid-Eastern Athletic Conference football standings
	Conf.					Overall
Team	W		L		T	W		L		T
Morgan State $	5	–	0	–	0	9	–	2	–	0
South Carolina State	4	–	1	–	0	8	–	3	–	0
North Carolina A&T	2	–	2	–	1	4	–	6	–	1
Howard	2	–	3	–	0	5	–	6	–	0
Delaware State	1	–	4	–	1	4	–	5	–	1
North Carolina Central	1	–	4	–	0	2	–	8	–	1
Maryland Eastern Shore	0	–	0	–	0	3	–	7	–	1
$ – Conference champion; Maryland Eastern Shore games did not count as conference games in 1979

The 1979 Morgan State Bears football team represented Morgan State University as a member of the Mid-Eastern Athletic Conference (MEAC) during the 1979 NCAA Division II football season. Led by second-year head coach Clarence Thomas, the Bears compiled an overall record of 9–2, and a mark of 5–0 in conference play, finished as MEAC champion, and were defeated by Alabama A&M in the NCAA Division II first round.

Although the MEAC was classified as part of the NCAA Division I-AA, Morgan State (along with North Carolina Central and Maryland Eastern Shore) competed as part of Division II for the 1979 season.

== Schedule ==
Date	Opponent	Rank	Site	Result	Attendance	Source
September 2	at Towson State*		Towson Stadium; Towson, MD (rivalry)	W 34–7	6,311	
September 8	vs. Grambling State*		Yankee Stadium; Bronx, NY	L 18–28	38,000–38,164	
September 29	at North Carolina Central	No. 10	O'Kelly Stadium; Durham, NC	W 20–6	2,000–12,000	
October 6	Maryland Eastern Shore	No. 8	Hughes Stadium; Baltimore, MD	W 41–8	4,000	
October 13	at South Carolina State	No. 8	State College Stadium; Orangeburg, SC	W 27–16	6,200–8,000	
October 20	at Delaware State	No. 7	Alumni Stadium; Dover, DE	W 22–0	1,500	
October 27	North Carolina A&T	No. T–6	Hughes Stadium; Baltimore, MD	W 29–9	15,000	
November 3	at No. 4 Virginia Union*	No. 6	Huguenot High School Stadium; Richmond, VA	W 14–7	1,000–2,000	
November 10	Virginia State*	No. 4	Hughes Stadium; Baltimore, MD	W 17–7	2,500	
November 17	Howard	No. 4	Hughes Stadium; Baltimore, MD (rivalry)	W 27–20	5,500	
November 24	at No. 9 Alabama A&M*	No. 4	Milton Frank Stadium; Huntsville, AL (NCAA Division II quarterfinal)	L 7–27	5,500	
*Non-conference game; Rankings from AP Poll released prior to the game
