= 1979 NCAA Division II football rankings =

The 1979 NCAA Division II football rankings are from the Associated Press. This is for the 1979 season.

== Legend ==
	Increase in ranking
	Decrease in ranking
	Not ranked previous week
(#–#)	Win–loss record
(Italics)	Number of first place votes
т	Tied with team above or below also with this symbol

== Associated Press poll ==
	Week 1 Sept 25	Week 2 Oct 2	Week 3 Oct 9	Week 4 Oct 16	Week 5 Oct 23	Week 6 Oct 30	Week 7 Nov 6	Week 8 Nov 13	
1.	Eastern Illinois (4–0)	Eastern Illinois (5–0)	Delaware (4–1)	Delaware (5–1)	Delaware (6–1)	Delaware (7–1) т	Delaware (8–1)	Delaware (9–1)	1.
2.	Delaware (2–1)	Delaware (3–1)	North Dakota (6–0)	Youngstown State (6–0)	Youngstown State (7–0)	Youngstown State (8–0) т	Youngstown State (9–0)	Youngstown State (9–1)	2.
3.	North Alabama (4–0)	North Dakota (5–0)	Youngstown State (5–0)	North Dakota (7–0)	North Dakota (8–0)	North Dakota (9–0)	North Dakota (9–1)	North Dakota (10–1)	3.
4.	North Dakota (4–0) т	Youngstown State (4–0)	Eastern Illinois (5–1)	Eastern Illinois (5–1)	Eastern Illinois (6–1)	Virginia Union (8–0)	Morgan State (7–1)	Morgan State (8–1)	4.
5.	Youngstown State (3–0) т	Virginia Union (4–0)	Virginia Union (5–0)	Virginia Union (6–0)	Virginia Union (7–0)	Cal Poly (6–1)	Mississippi College (8–1)	Mississippi College (9–1)	5.
6.	Nebraska–Omaha (4–0)	South Dakota (4–1)	Norfolk State (5–0–1)	Norfolk State (6–0–1)	Morgan State (5–1) т	Morgan State (6–1)	Virginia Union (8–1)	Virginia Union (9–1)	6.
7.	Virginia Union (3–1)	Norfolk State (4–0–1)	Santa Clara (5–0)	Morgan State (4–1)	Cal Poly (5–1) т	Mississippi College (7–1)	Cal Poly (6–2)	Cal Poly (7–2)	7.
8.	Santa Clara (3–0)	Morgan State (2–1)	Morgan State (3–1)	Cal Poly (4–1)	South Dakota State (6–1)	Eastern Illinois (6–2)	South Dakota State (7–2)	South Dakota State (8–2)	8.
9.	Norfolk State (4–0)	Santa Clara (4–0)	Cal Poly (3–1)	South Dakota State (5–1)	Alabama A&M (5–1)	Santa Clara (6–1)	Alabama A&M (6–2)	Alabama A&M (7–2)	9.
10.	Morgan State (1–1)	Nebraska–Omaha (4–1)	Nebraska–Omaha (5–1)	Alabama A&M (5–1)	Mississippi College (6–1)	South Dakota State (6–2)	Santa Clara (6–2)	Santa Clara (6–2)	10.
	Week 1 Sept 25	Week 2 Oct 2	Week 3 Oct 9	Week 4 Oct 16	Week 5 Oct 23	Week 6 Oct 30	Week 7 Nov 6	Week 8 Nov 13	
		Dropped: 3 North Alabama	Dropped: 6 South Dakota	Dropped: 7 Santa Clara; 10 Nebraska–Omaha	Dropped: 6 Norfolk State	Dropped: 9 Alabama A&M	Dropped: 8 Eastern Illinois	None	
